= Alm (surname) =

Alm is a Swedish surname that may refer to

- Alvin L. Alm (1937–2000), administrator at the American Environmental Protection Agency
- Andreas Alm (born 1973), Swedish association football player
- Ann-Sofie Alm (born 1971), Swedish politician
- Chuck Alm (1937–2025), American rower
- Clara Alm (born 1996), Swedish footballer
- Eivor Alm (1924–2011), Swedish cross-country skier
- Ernst Alm (1900–1980), Swedish cross-country skier
- Immanuel Alm (1767–1809), Finnish painter
- James Alm (born 1950), American economist
- Jeff Alm (1968–1993), American football player
- Jenny Alm (born 1989), Swedish handball player
- Johan Alm (1728–1810), Finnish painter and field sergeant
- Johan Alm (ice hockey) (born 1992), Swedish ice hockey defenceman
- John R. Alm (born 1946), American businessman, former president and Chief Executive Officer for Coca-Cola Enterprises
- Josef Alm (1889–1957), Swedish weapon historian
- Kerstin Alm (born 1949), politician of the autonomous Åland Islands
- Knut Alm (1889–1969), Swedish runner
- Maja Alm (born 1988), Danish orienteering competitor
- Steve Alm (born 1953/54), Prosecuting Attorney of Honolulu
