= 6.5×55mm Swedish =

Nordic 6mm centerfire cartridge

6.5×55mm
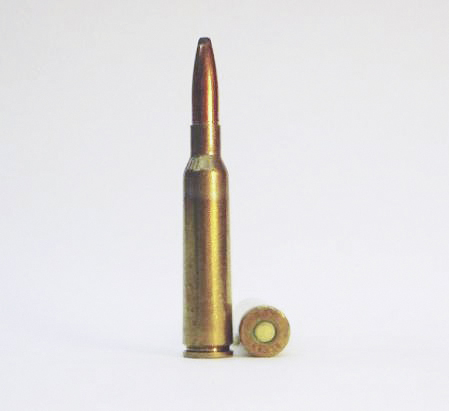
- 6.5×55mm
- Type: Military rifle
- Place of origin: United Kingdoms of Sweden and Norway; Sweden; Norway

Service history
- In service: 1894–1995
- Used by: United Kingdoms of Sweden and Norway; Sweden; Norway

Production history
- Designed: 1891
- Produced: 1894–present

Specifications
- Case type: Rimless, bottleneck
- Bullet diameter: 6.71 mm (0.264 in)
- Land diameter: 6.50 mm (0.256 in)
- Neck diameter: 7.60 mm (0.299 in)
- Shoulder diameter: 11.04 mm (0.435 in)
- Base diameter: 12.20 mm (0.480 in)
- Rim diameter: 12.20 mm (0.480 in)
- Rim thickness: 1.50 mm (0.059 in)
- Case length: 55.00 mm (2.165 in)
- Overall length: 80.00 mm (3.150 in)
- Case capacity: 3.75 cm^{3} (57.9 gr H_{2}O)
- Rifling twist: 200 mm (1-7.87 in)
- Primer type: Large rifle
- Maximum pressure (C.I.P.): 380.0 MPa (55,110 psi)
- Maximum pressure (SAAMI): 351.6 MPa (51,000 psi)
- Maximum CUP: 46,000 CUP

Ballistic performance
| Bullet mass/type | Velocity | Energy |
|---|---|---|
| 6.5 g (100 gr) HP | 970 m/s (3,200 ft/s) | 3,050 J (2,250 ft⋅lbf) |
| 7.8 g (120 gr) BT | 857 m/s (2,810 ft/s) | 2,858 J (2,108 ft⋅lbf) |
| 9.1 g (140 gr) SP | 808 m/s (2,650 ft/s) | 2,962 J (2,185 ft⋅lbf) |
| 9.1 g (140 gr) DK | 870 m/s (2,900 ft/s) | 3,440 J (2,540 ft⋅lbf) |
| 10 g (154 gr) EVO | 780 m/s (2,600 ft/s) | 3,072 J (2,266 ft⋅lbf) |
- Source: Hodgdon RWS/RUAG Ammotec

The 6.5×55mm is a high-performance smokeless-powder rifle cartridge.

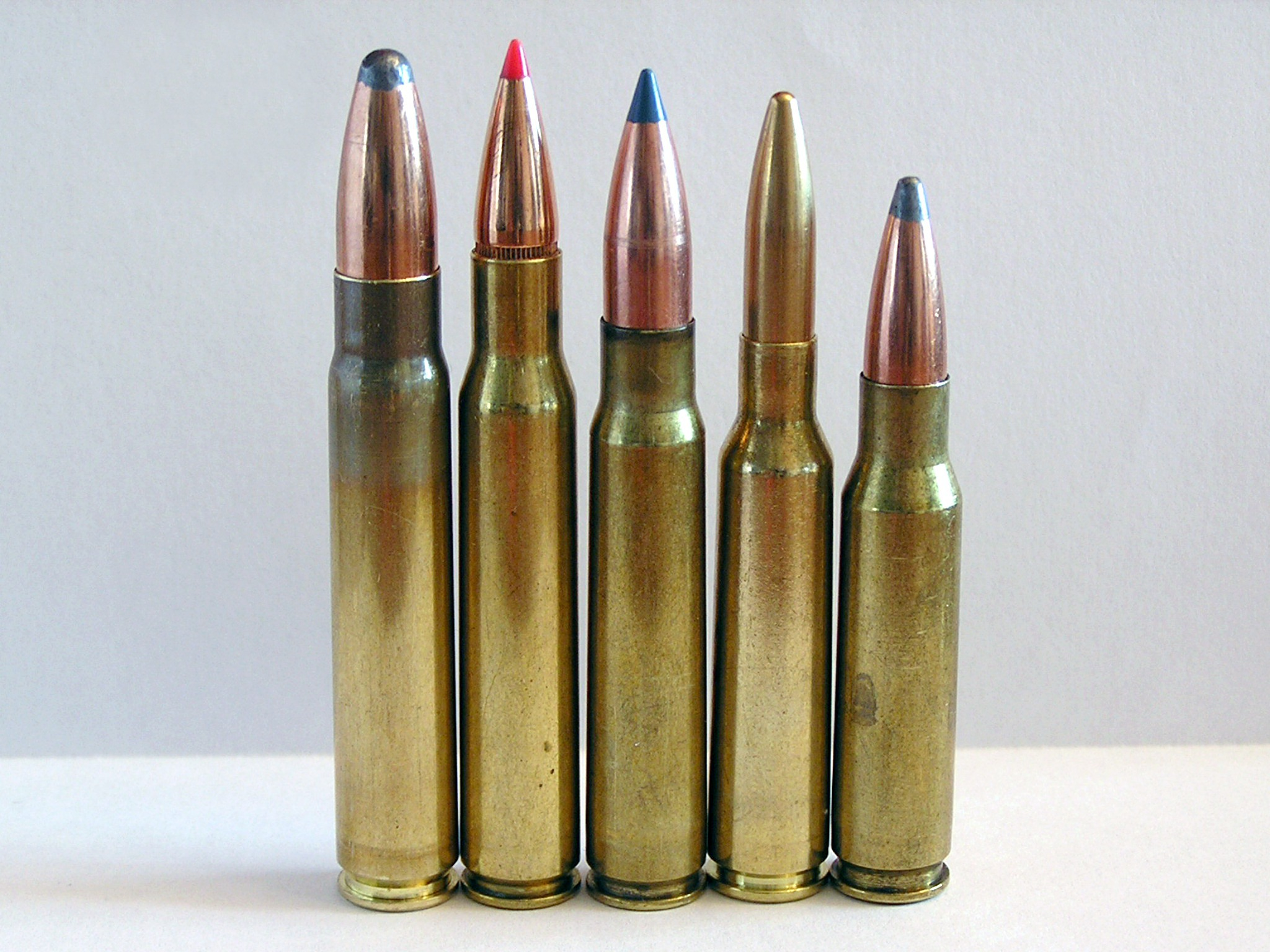
From left to right 9.3×62mm, .30-06 Springfield, 7.92×57mm Mauser, 6.5×55mm and .308 Winchester cartridges

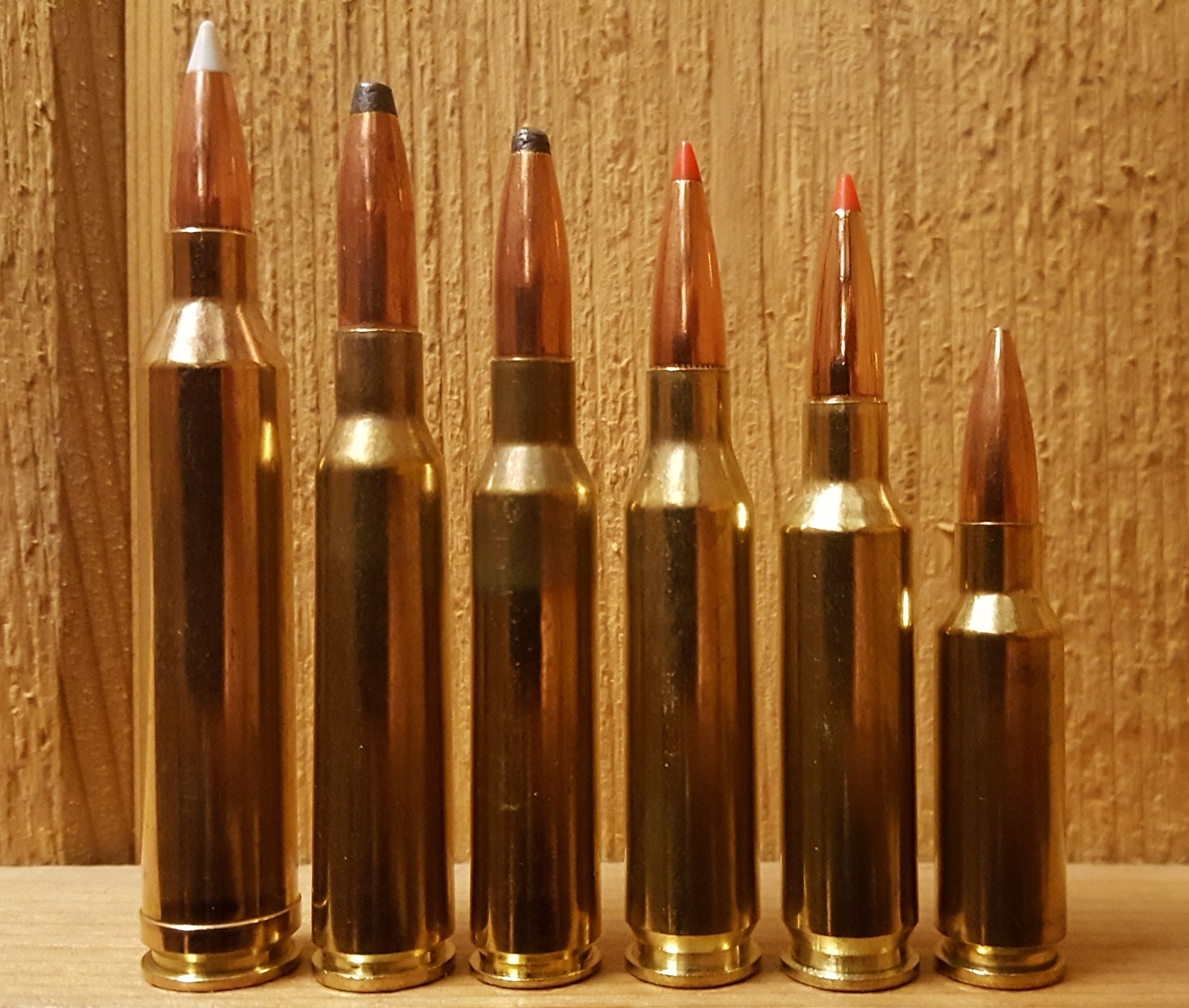
Size comparison of some 6.5 mm cartridges, left to right: .264 Winchester Magnum, 6.5×55mm, 6.5×52mm Carcano, .260 Remington, 6.5mm Creedmoor, and 6.5mm Grendel

6.5×55mm Swedish, also known simply as 6.5×55mm, 6.5x55 SE, 6.5x55 Swede, or in its native military as 6,5 mm patron m/94 (6,5 mm ptr m/94), meaning "6.5 mm cartridge model 94", referring to 1894, is a first-generation smokeless powder rimless bottlenecked rifle cartridge. Most users of the cartridge are in Scandinavia, where it is known as the 6,5×55 or just "the 6,5". The book Cartridge Cases refers to the cartridge as 6.5x55 Norway & Sweden.

Introduced in the 1890s, the 6.5x55mm is still one of the most common cartridges in modern rifles built for the Scandinavian market. The cartridge was developed in a joint Norwegian and Swedish effort starting in 1891 for use in the new service rifles then under consideration by the United Kingdoms of Sweden and Norway. In 1893, the cartridge was standardized and adopted under the name 6.5×55mm to facilitate logistical cooperation between Norway and Sweden. The two nations had independent armies and the normal procedure at the time was for their respective governments to use the same ammunition and then purchase small arms of their choice. Norway adopted the Krag–Jørgensen M/1894 rifle, while Sweden adopted the Mauser m/1896 rifle that was based on a Mauser service rifle, designed around the 7×57mm Mauser cartridge.

The 6.5×55mm cartridge has a smaller bullet diameter and lower free recoil than other full-power service rifle cartridges such as the .303 British, 7.92×57mm Mauser, .30-06 Springfield, and 7.62×54mmR. Thanks in part to its relatively roomy case which was designed for loading long, heavy 6.71 mm (0.264 in) bullets, and a 12.2 mm (0.480 in) diameter bolt face, it has proven more successful than other first-generation smokeless-powder military cartridges of similar calibers, such as the 6×60mm US Navy, 6.5×54mm Mannlicher–Schönauer, 6.5×53mmR Dutch Mannlicher, 6.5×52mm Carcano and 6.5×50mm Arisaka.

Although the generic cartridge name is 6.5×55mm, there are some variations in chamberings. In addition to the original 1890s specification, three modern chambering and ammunition pressure variations also exist.

- 6.5 × 55 SE is the European C.I.P. designation with SE being the Swedish two-letter ISO country code.
- 6.5×55 Swedish is the American SAAMI designation (official SAAMI abbreviation 6.5×55).
- 6.5 × 55 SKAN is the Scandinavian designation used by the Scandinavian shooting associations DFS, DGI and SvSF.

== History and development ==
In 1886, France introduced a cartridge for use with the then new smokeless propellant, introduced as Poudre B, in the 1886 pattern 8×50mmR Lebel, which started a military rifle ammunition revolution.

In 1891, the Swedish-Norwegian Rifle Commission started its work. After extensive ballistic tests where different calibers were tested (8mm, 7.5mm, 7mm, 6.5mm etc.), the optimal caliber was determined to be 6.5mm (0.256in). Following this decision, a joint Norwegian-Swedish commission was established in December 1893. This commission worked through a series of meetings to decide on the different measurements for the cartridge case. The Norwegians presented a 6.5mm rimless cartridge design, but the Swedes wanted a rimmed cartridge. As a compromise, the Norwegians produced an experimental semi-rimmed cartridge which was very similar to what would become the final version. The book Cartridge Cases refers to this cartridge as 6.5mm Norwegian Experimantal. This cartridge had a 6.7mm bullet, a 55mm long case, but differed from what became the final version by having a slightly less tapered shoulder, a slightly smaller diameter base (11.75mm) as well as being semi-rimmed (12mm). However, after a firearm demonstration by Mauser, the Swedes changed their mind and wanted a rimless design. After further discussions, a rimless cartridge case of 55mm length was approved, and each possible measurement (diameter at base, diameter at neck, angle of case, angle of shoulder etc.) was decided upon. The corresponding dimensions of the cartridge chamber to be used in a future service rifle were also determined. The design of the joint Norwegian-Swedish commission was subsequently adopted by the Norwegian and Swedish governments, and entered service in the Norwegian and Swedish militaries. The cartridge was also adopted by the Danish, Norwegian and Swedish civilian shooting associations DDS, DFS and FSR.

In 1984, the C.I.P. independently standardized the cartridge as 6.5 × 55 SE, and revised their standard in 2002 and 2007.

In 1990, a specification was introduced along with the Scandinavian target rifle by the Scandinavian shooting associations DDS, DFS and FSR with the designation 6.5 × 55 mm SKAN which tightened up the original tolerances (minimum and maximum dimensions) of the 1893 design standard, added a slightly longer chamber space for the neck for increased safety with untrimmed reloads, and increased the pressure rating. The SKAN chambering is approved for firing any 6.5×55mm cartridges satisfying the aforementioned C.I.P. and SAAMI standards.

In 1993, the SAAMI also independently standardized the cartridge as 6.5×55mm Swedish, with the official SAAMI abbreviation being 6.5×55.

The closest European and American ballistic twins of the 6.5×55mm are probably the German 6.5×57mm Mauser and the American .260 Remington cartridges. While the 6.5×57mm and 6.5×55mm both require a long-action receiver, the shorter .260 Remington (being based on the .308 Winchester cartridge) can be fitted to a short bolt-action format. Other 21st century cartridges, such as the 6.5×47mm Lapua and the 6.5mm Creedmoor that have entered the market also are able to provide similar performance to factory 6.5×55mm ammunition. However, the extra case volume of the 6.5×55mm promotes a longer lifespan of the cartridge case when reloading, and will provide higher velocities when handloaded to the same pressure as its more modern counterparts. However, the approved chamber pressure ratings for older rifles then may be exceeded.

== Cartridge specifications ==
=== Original specifications ===
All Swedish Mauser bolt actions were proof tested with a single 6.5×55mm proof round developing approximately 455 MPa (65,992 psi) piezo pressure (55,000 CUP psi).

According to the book Norske Militærgeværer etter 1867, each Norwegian military Krag–Jørgensen rifle, when manufacture began, was fired at the factory (either Kongsberg Våpenfabrikk or Steyr) with proofing rounds rated at 4,000 atm (58,784 psi), 4,500 atm (66,132 psi) and 5,000 atm (73,480 psi) copper units of pressure. After a while, use of the 5,000 atm (73,480 psi) proofing rounds was dropped, as they were viewed as "unnecessarily powerful". Proofing with 4,000 atm (58,784 psi) and 4,500 atm (66,132 psi) rounds was continued, as they were viewed as necessary to get the action threads "set" and thereby "strengthening the barrel". During this process, the chamber tended to lengthen by 0.002 to 0.003 mm (8×10^{−5} to 0.00012 in) and a maximum of 0.005 mm (0.00020 in) was accepted.

=== Swedish and Norwegian chamber differences rumor ===
Some historians have assumed that there was a difference in cartridge blueprint measurements between the Swedish and Norwegian versions of 6.5×55mm ammunition, and this may have been unintentional. Due to different interpretations of the blueprint standard, i.e. the standards of manufacturing using maximum chamber in the Krag vs. minimum chamber in the Swedish Mauser, a small percentage of the ammunition produced in Norway proved to be slightly oversize when chambered in the Swedish Mauser action, i.e. requiring a push on the bolt handle to chamber in the Swedish arm. A rumor arose not long after the 6.5×55mm cartridge was adopted that one could use Swedish ammunition in Norwegian rifles, but not Norwegian ammunition in Swedish rifles. Some even alleged that this incompatibility was deliberate, to give Norway the tactical advantage of using captured ammunition in a war, while denying the same advantage to Sweden. However, after the rumor first surfaced in 1900, the issue was examined by the Swedish military. They declared the difference to be insignificant, and that both the Swedish and Norwegian ammunition were within the specified parameters laid down. Despite this finding, the Swedish weapon-historian Josef Alm repeated the rumor in a book in the 1930s, leading many to believe that there was a significant difference between the ammunition manufactured in Norway and Sweden.

=== C.I.P. specifications ===
The 6.5×55mm has 3.75 ml (57.9 gr H_{2}O) cartridge case capacity. The exterior shape of the case was designed to promote reliable case feeding and extraction in bolt-action rifles and machine guns alike, under extreme conditions.

6.5×55mm maximum C.I.P. cartridge dimensions. All sizes in millimeters (mm).

Americans define the shoulder angle at alpha/2 ≈ 25.6 degrees. The common rifling twist rate for this cartridge is 220 mm (1 in 8.66 in), 4 grooves, Ø lands = 6.50 mm (0.256 in), Ø grooves = 6.73 mm (0.265 in), land width = 2.5 mm (0.098 in), and the primer type is large rifle.

According to the official C.I.P. rulings the 6.5×55mm can handle up to 380.00 MPa (55,114 psi) P_{max} piezo pressure. In C.I.P. regulated countries every rifle cartridge combo has to be proofed at 125% of this maximum C.I.P. pressure to certify for sale to consumers. This means that 6.5×55mm chambered arms in C.I.P. regulated countries are currently (2013) proof tested at 475.00 MPa (68,893 psi) PE piezo pressure.

As Denmark, Norway, and Sweden are not C.I.P. member states, neither their civilian users nor their shooting associations DDS, DFS and FSR have to oblige to the C.I.P. rulings in force.

=== SAAMI specifications ===
The SAAMI maximum average pressure (MAP) for this cartridge is 51,000 psi (351.6 MPa) piezo pressure measured with modern piezoelectric pressure gauges that more accurately measure chamber pressures or alternatively 46,000 CUP psi measured by the (outdated) deformation of a copper cylinder.

=== SKAN specifications ===
The SKAN specification was introduced to tighten up the original tolerances of the 1893 design standard. Otherwise its measurements are almost identical to the original standard except for a slightly longer chamber space for the neck by less than a millimeter. Complying barrels have usually been marked with "6,5 × 55 SKAN".

In 2018, the tighter C.I.P. chamber (6,5 × 55 SE) was banned from competitions in the Scandinavian shooting associations on the grounds of competitive equity and safety. Since 2020, regulation changes in Germany resulted in new SKAN barrels manufactured by SIG Sauer being marked "6,5 × 55 SE, approved for SKAN".

The SKAN chambering is sometimes erroneously referred to as SCAN.

== Military ammunition ==
=== Nomenclature ===
In the militaries of Sweden and Norway the 6.5×55mm cartridge is designated as 6.5 mm patron m/94 (6.5 mm ptr m/94), initially spelled with complete year (m/1894), meaning 6.5 mm cartridge model 1894. The core designation is usually expanded on depending on what type of design the cartridge has:

- Skarp patron (sk ptr) – 'sharp cartridge' (literal), 'live cartridge' (formal) – live ammunition for combat or practice shooting.
- Kammarpatron (kptr) – 'chamber cartridge' (literal), 'gallery cartridge' (formal) – gallery ammunition for short range indoor shooting.
- Lös patron (lös ptr) – 'loose cartridge' (literal) or 'blank cartridge' (formal) – blank ammunition with wooden/plastic projectile for blank-firing adaptor use.
- Blindpatron (blindptr) – 'blind cartridge' (literal) or 'dummy cartridge' (formal) – dummy ammunition for different exercises.
- Laddblindpatron (laddblindptr) – 'blind loading cartridge' (literal) or 'dummy loading cartridge' (formal) – dummy ammunition specifically for loading exercises.

=== Cartridges ===
Various military variants of the 6.5×55mm cartridge have been developed over the years; types such as enhanced precision, armor piercing, tracer, blank, inert and training cartridges have been available. See the table at the bottom of the article for an overview of the most common 6.5×55mm military cartridges that have been used.

==== Long round-nose service ball (1894) ====
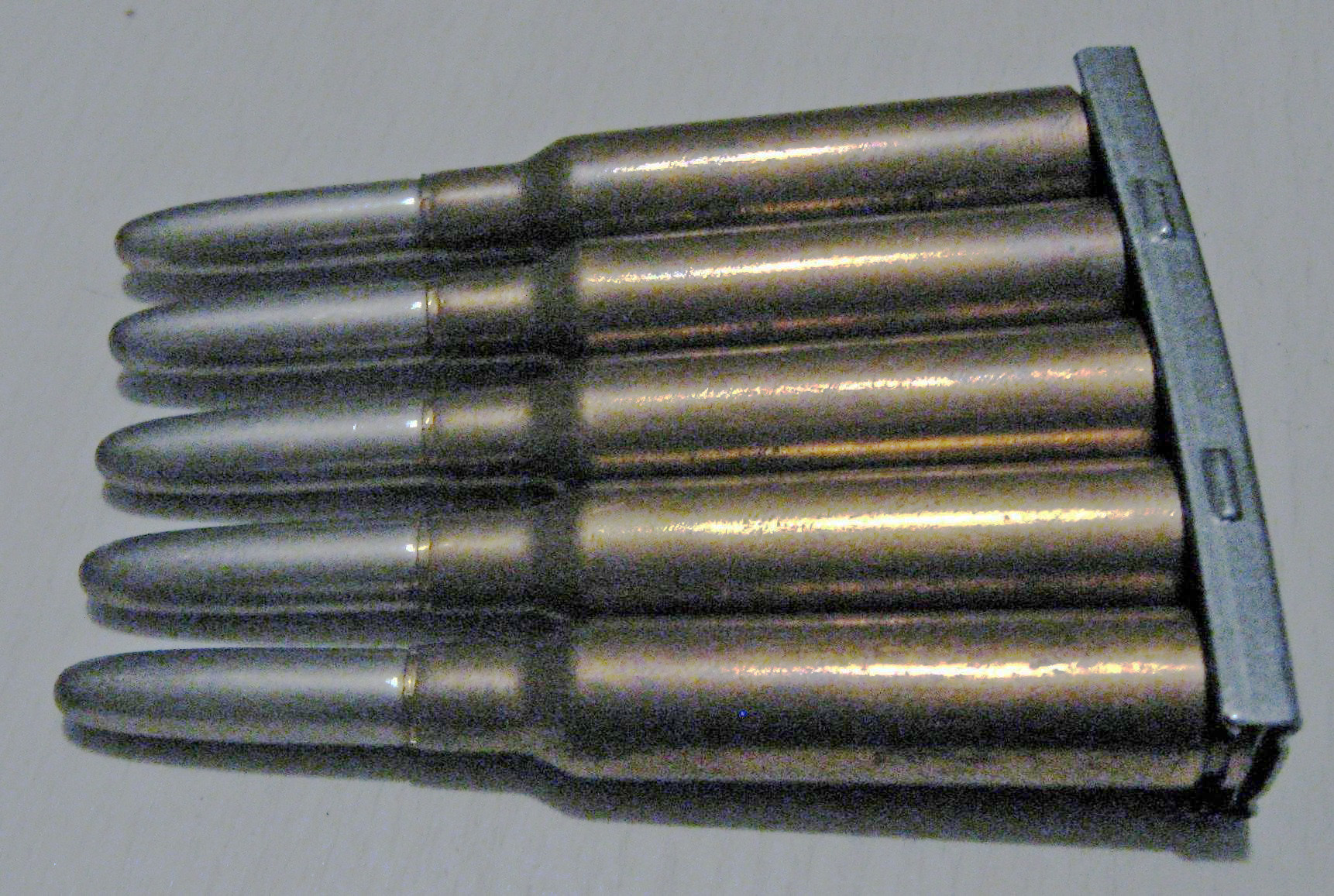
Swedish 6.5 mm skarp patron m/94 projektil m/94 ball ammunition

The initial service projectile introduced for the 6.5 mm m/94 cartridge in 1894 was a long round-nosed ball projectile, in Swedish described either as an "ogive bullet" (Swedish: ogivalkula) or "blunt bullet" (Swedish: trubbkula). The projectile weighed 10.1 grams (156 gr) and reached a muzzle velocity of 725 m/s (2,379 ft/s) with 2,654 J (1,957 ft⋅lbf) muzzle energy when fired from a 739 mm (29.1 in) long barrel.

This cartridge was initially designated as 6.5 mm skarp patron m/94 (6.5 mm sk ptr m/94) – meaning 6.5 mm live cartridge m/94 – but in 1942 the designation changed to include the projectile in order to more easily distinguish it from other variants, becoming 6.5 mm skarp patron m/94 projektil m/94 (6.5 mm sk ptr m/94 prj m/94) – meaning 6.5 mm live cartridge m/94 projectile m/94.

The 6.5 mm sk ptr m/94 prj m/94 was the standard service ball cartridge up to the early phase of World War II and German occupation of Norway in 1940. Reference to it was removed from Swedish ammunition manuals in 1976.

==== Spitzer boat tail service ball (1941) ====
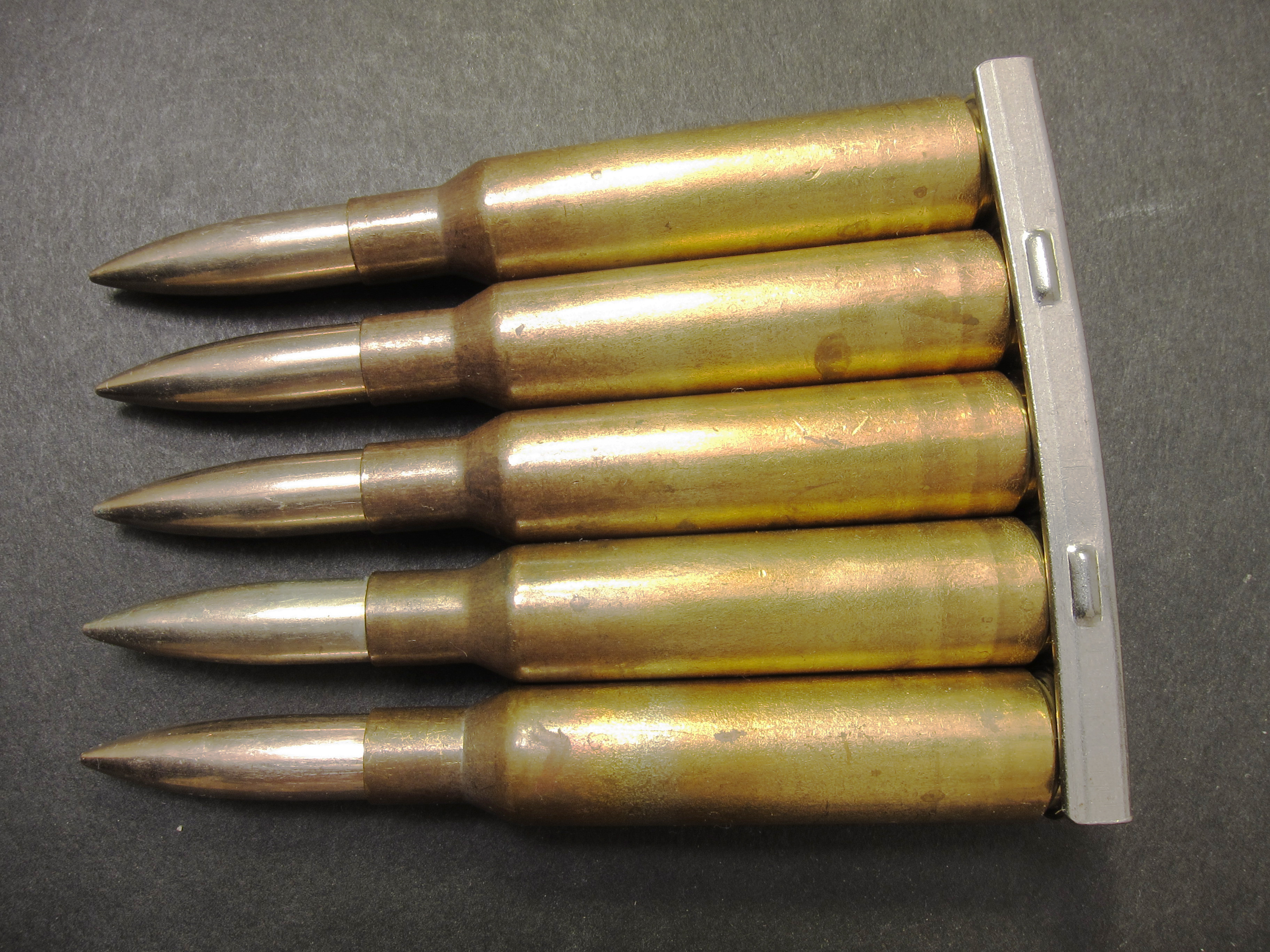
Swedish 6.5 mm skarp patron m/94 projektil m/41 prickskytte ball ammunition

Later service ball version of the 6.5 mm m/94 cartridge, adopted in 1941.

- 1941 designation: 6.5 mm skarp patron m/94-41 (6.5 mm sk ptr m/94-41) – meaning 6.5 mm live cartridge m/94-41
- 1942 designation: 6.5 mm skarp patron m/94 projektil m/41 prickskytte (6.5 mm sk ptr m/94 prj m/41) – meaning 6.5 mm live cartridge m/94 projectile m/41 sniping

Sweden, which remained neutral during World War II, decided during the early 1940s to develop a new ball projectile for the 6.5 mm m/94 cartridge intended for sniping and sharpshooting, specifically for weapons such as the m/41 sniper rifle. To improve accuracy and ballistics the new projectile was designed as a spitzer bullet, a design which had previously not been used for the 6.5 mm/94 cartridge. The new cartridge was loaded with a 9.1 grams (140 gr) boat-tail spitzer bullet (D-projectile) fired at a muzzle velocity of 800 m/s (2,625 ft/s) with 2,912 J (2,148 ft⋅lbf) muzzle energy from a 739 mm (29.1 in) long barrel.

The new Spitzer cartridge was adopted from around 1941 onwards. As the original round-nosed m/94 projectile was obsolete, the new Spitzer projectile came to replace it as the new service ball cartridge almost immediately.

==== Blanks ====
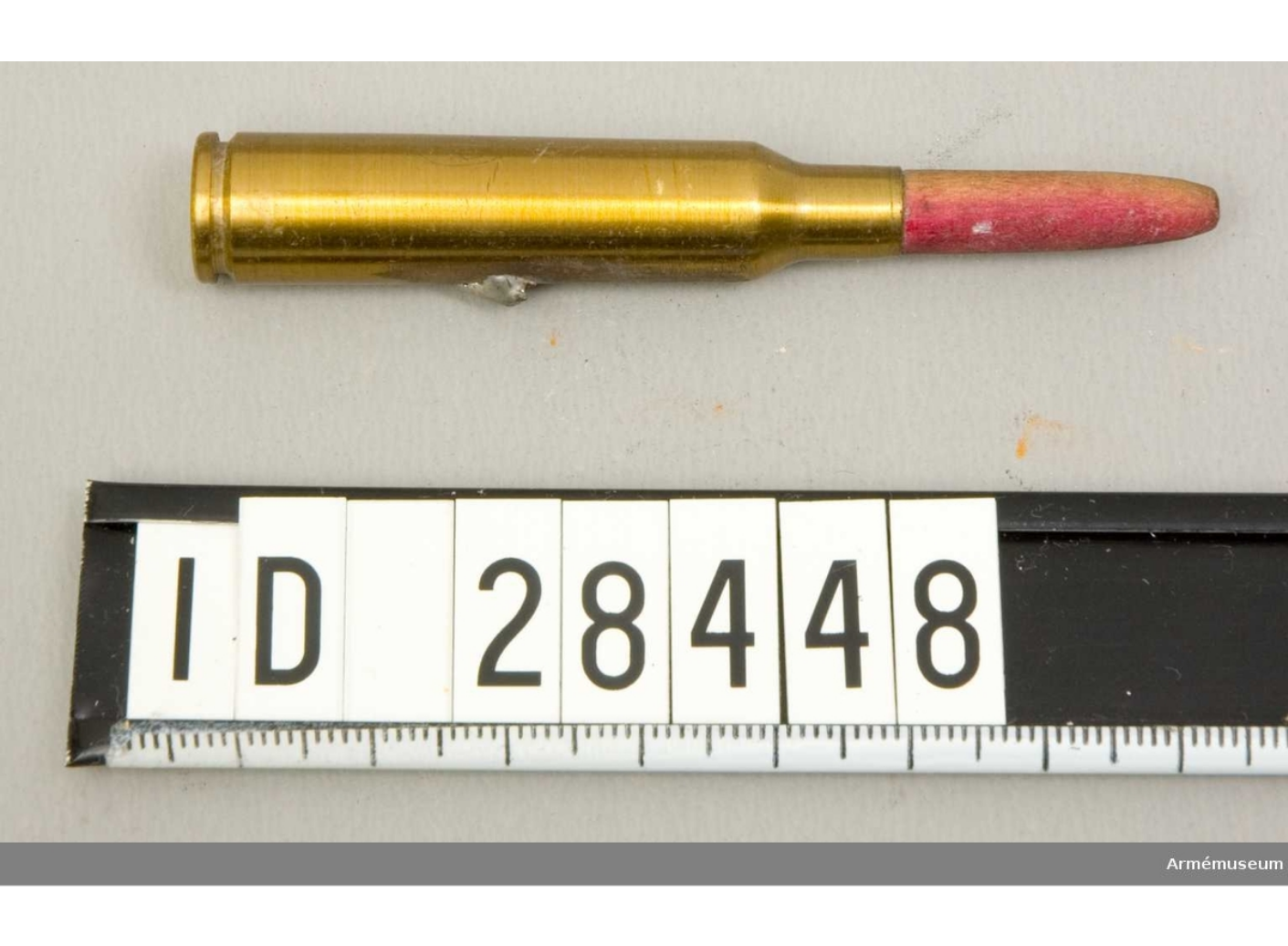
Swedish 6.5 mm lös patron m/94 blank ammunition with red wooden projectile

Swedish blanks or lös patron were loaded with bullet shaped wooden projectiles that were painted red. To fire these blanks, the Swedish military used a blank-firing attachment (BFA). These adapters were mounted on the muzzle and designed to shred the wooden projectile as it exited the muzzle to prevent injuries to nearby people and to allow functioning of automatic weapons.

A wooden blank designed to fire rifle grenades was also designed. It was used in a dedicated rifle grenade launcher based on the Remington m/67-89 (originally chambered for 8x58RD) called Krevadkarbin m/16 (blast carbine m/16). The Krevadkarbin m/16 was outfitted with a "rifle grenade cup" at the end of a very short barrel for the wooden blank.

==== Pressure ====
The Swedish 6.5×55mm military ammunition had, according to their ammunition registry of 1960, a normal average pressure of 3,300 bar (330 MPa; 47,862 psi) with the exception of tracer rounds (slprj m/39 and m/41) at 2,900 bar (290 MPa; 42,061 psi) and armour piercing (pprj m/41) at 3,500 bar (350 MPa; 50,763 psi). The method of measurement is not stated.

The book Norske Militærgeværer etter 1867 cites the standard ammunition as having a standard working pressure of 3,500 atm (3,546 bar; 355 MPa; 51,436 psi) measured with a copper crusher.

== Table of military 6.5×55mm cartridges ==
Swedish military ammunition (post 1942 designations)
| Cartridge | Projectile | Type | Config |
Ball cartridges
| 6.5 mm skarp patron m/94 6.5 mm sk ptr m/94 6.5 mm live cartridge m/94 | projektil m/94 prj m/94 projectile m/94 | Service ball | Long round-nose |
| | projektil m/41 "prickskytte" prj m/41 "prickskytte" projectile m/41 "sniping" | Service ball | Spitzer boat tail |
Practice cartridges
| 6.5 mm skarp patron m/94 6.5 mm sk ptr m/94 6.5 mm live cartridge m/94 | projektil m/94 "endast för fredsskjutning" prj m/94 "endast för fredsskjutning" projectile m/94 "only for peacetime shooting" | Long range practice ball | Long round-nose |
| | projektil m/41 "endast för fredsskjutning" prj m/41 "endast för fredsskjutning" projectile m/41 "only for peacetime shooting" | Long range practice ball | Spitzer boat tail |
| | övningsprojektil m/44 övnprj m/44 practice projectile m/44 | Short range practice ball | Short round-nose |
Tracer cartridges
| 6.5 mm skarp patron m/94 6.5 mm sk ptr m/94 6.5 mm live cartridge m/94 | spårljusprojektil m/39 slprj m/39 tracer projectile m/39 | Tracer ball | Long round-nose |
| | spårljusprojektil m/41 slprj m/41 tracer projectile m/41 | Tracer ball | Spitzer |
Armor piercing cartridges
| 6.5 mm skarp patron m/94 6.5 mm sk ptr m/94 6.5 mm live cartridge m/94 | pansarprojektil m/41 pprj m/41 armor projectile m/41 | Armor piercing | Spitzer boat tail, tungsten carbide core |
Gallery cartridges
| 6.5 mm kammarpatron m/12 6.5 mm kptr m/12 6.5 mm chamber cartridge m/12 | | Gallery cartridge for short range training | Short blunt-nose, full metal jacket, wooden core |
Blank cartridges
| 6.5 mm lös patron m/94 6.5 mm lös ptr m/94 6.5 mm loose cartridge m/94 | | Wooden blank for blank-firing adaptor (not for MG-use) | Long round-nose, wooden body |
| 6.5 mm lös patron m/14 6.5 mm lös ptr m/146.5 mm loose cartridge m/14 | | Wooden blank for blank-firing adaptor | Spitzer, wooden body |
| 6.5 mm lös patron m/16 6.5 mm lös ptr m/16 6.5 mm loose cartridge m/16 | | Wooden blank for rifle-grenade rifle | Long round-nose, wooden body |
Dummy cartridges
| 6.5 mm blindpatron m/06 6.5 mm blindptr m/06 6.5 mm blind cartridge m/06 | | Dummy round | "prj m/94" ball dummy cartridge |

== Military service ==
=== Norwegian service ===
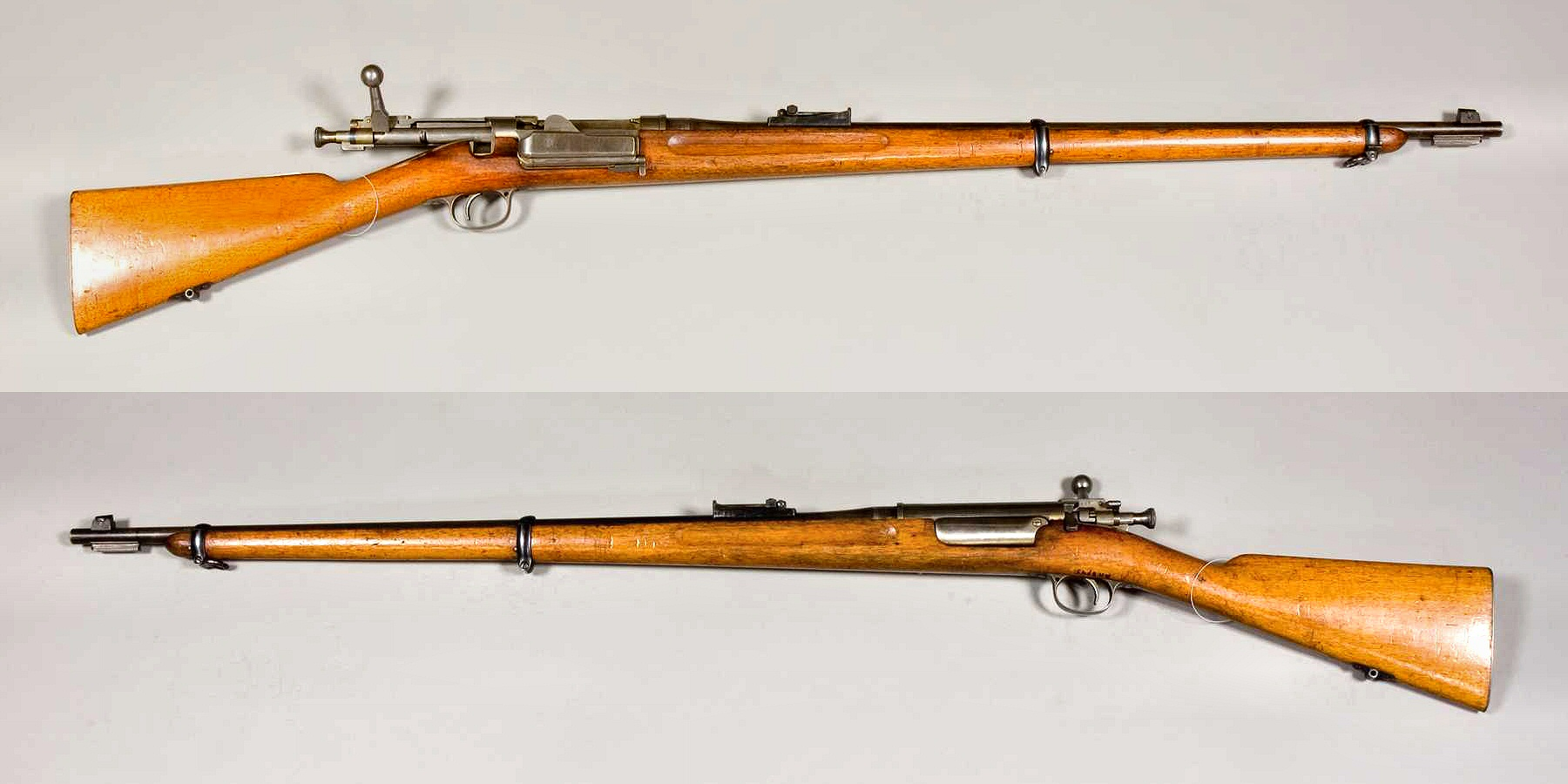
Norwegian Krag–Jørgensen Model 1892 prototype rifle (not identical to the Model 1894 adopted for military use)

The 6.5×55mm cartridge was used by Norway in the Krag–Jørgensen bolt-action rifle and in the Madsen machine gun, as well as in several prototype self-loading rifles.

=== Swedish service ===
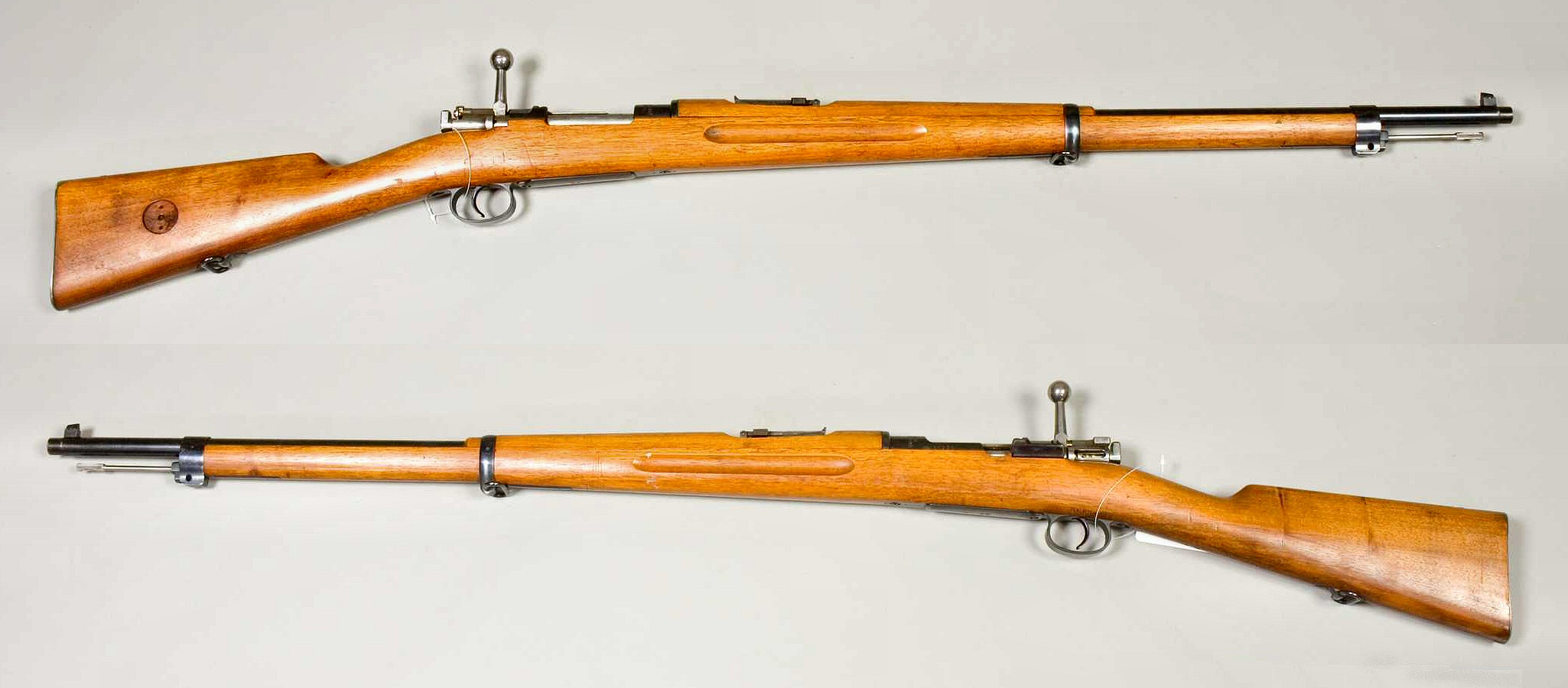
Swedish Mauser Model 1896 rifle

In Swedish service, the 6.5×55mm cartridge was used in the Swedish Mauser family of bolt action arms comprising the m/94 (Model 1894) carbine, m/96 (Model 1896) long rifle, m/38 (Model 1938) short rifle and m/41 (Model 1941) sniper rifle and the Ag m/42 semi-automatic rifle. The Swedish Mauser arms had a relatively tight 200 mm (1 in 7.87 in) twist rate optimized for stabilizing the relatively long heavy bullets used in the Swedish 6.5×55mm military service ammunition. It was also used in several light, medium and heavy machine guns such as the Schwarzlose, Browning BAR, Kg/1940 Light machine gun, Bren Gun, Browning M1917, Browning M1919 and FN MAG. The Swedish FN MAG's were rechambered to 7.62×51mm NATO during the early 1970s when the Swedish armed forces switched to that cartridge as its standard for commonality reasons, following the adoption of the Ak 4 battle rifle variant of the Heckler & Koch G3 in the mid 1960s.

=== Danish service ===
In 1946 Denmark made a standard cartridge with two different bullets. The 6.5 mm skarppatroner m/46-ru had a rundspids (round tip) bullet (like the Swedish projektil m/94) for use with Danish Krag rifles by the Home Guard. The 6.5 mm skarppatroner m/46-sp had a spidsskarp (pointed tip) bullet (like the projektil m/41) for use in more modern firearms like the Swedish Mauser.

=== Luxembourgish service ===
In 1900, Luxembourg adopted a nearly identical Mauser to that of the Swedish model.

== Sporting use ==
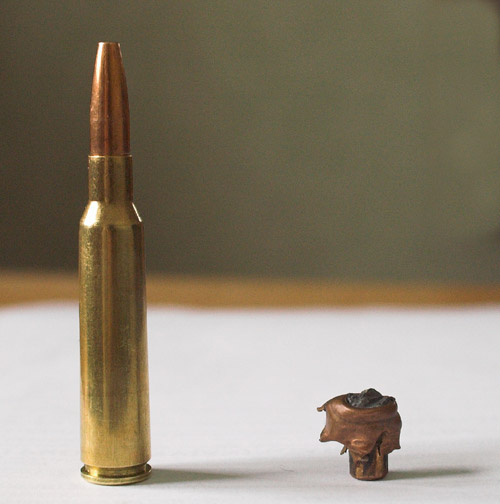
Expanding bullet loaded in a 6.5×55mm before and after expanding. The long base and small expanded diameter show that this is a bullet designed for deep penetration on large game. The bullet in the photo travelled more than halfway through an elk before coming to rest, performing as designed.

The 6.5×55mm cartridge is highly esteemed as a hunting round in Europe (particularly in Scandinavia), and North America. It is used for hunting most kind of game including moose in Scandinavia, while in most other countries it is used to hunt deer and other medium-sized game. Sportsmen who favor the round laud the combination of low recoil coupled with the cartridge's inherent accuracy and penetrative qualities due to its high sectional density.

Despite its enduring popularity amongst a devoted niche of American sportsmen, U.S. rifle manufacturers have, for the most part, ignored the cartridge. As of 2014 there were at least four mainstream American arms manufacturers, Thompson Center, Barrett Firearms (Fieldcraft), Remington (Model 700), and Ruger producing a sporting rifle chambered for the 6.5×55mm.

European rifle makers including Blaser, CZ, Sauer & Sohn, Steyr, and Mauser Jagdwaffen GmbH offer sporting rifles chambered for this cartridge, as does the Finnish arms manufacturer SAKO/Tikka, and the Japanese manufacturer Howa, while ammunition manufacturers such as Norma, Lapua, Prvi Partizan, RUAG Ammotec, Remington Arms, and Hornady offer loadings of the 6.5×55mm round that are designed for use only in modern hunting rifles that can tolerate higher chamber pressures. Finnish powder manufacturer Vihtavuori warns that modern 380.00 MPa (55,114 psi) P_{max} piezo pressure loadings should never be used in the Krag–Jørgensen or Swedish Mauser or similar older rifles. This warning is relevant as the Danish, Norwegian and Swedish national shooting organizations strive to keep the costs of participating in their shooting events reasonable. Their rulings restrict the use of very expensive highly specialized target rifles by allowing only the use of their respective (historic) military service rifles and the SIG Sauer 200 STR rifle.

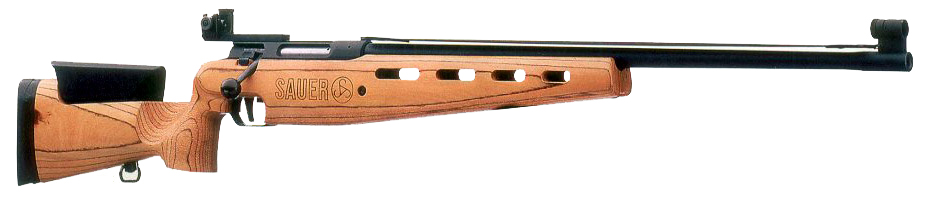
6.5×55mm Sauer 200 STR (Scandinavian target rifle) mostly used as a target/competition rifle for national competitions by Norwegian, Swedish and Danish sport shooters

Because 6.5 mm (.264 in) bullets have relatively high ballistic coefficients, the 6.5×55mm has seen success in long range target matches of 300–1,000 m (328–1,094 yd). The 6.5×55mm cartridge was widely used in fullbore biathlon competitions until 1975 (when it was replaced by the .22 Long Rifle (.22 LR) rimfire cartridge), because of its inherent accuracy and historical popularity with the Scandinavian nations who have dominated this sport. The 6.5×55mm was and is used for 1,000 yd (914.4 m) target disciplines such as F-Class and Benchrest shooting. The cartridge is also used by Scandinavian target shooters that use the Sauer 200 STR (Scandinavian target rifle) as their competition rifle. Metallic silhouette shooters also use the 6.5×55mm. In North America, the 6.5×55mm was the third most frequently mentioned caliber for hunter rifle at the 2003 Metallic Silhouette Nationals.

=== Wildcats ===
The 6.5×55mm case is also used as the parent case for modified variants that are not officially registered with or sanctioned by C.I.P. or SAAMI. Such cartridges which use commercial factory cases are generally known as wildcats. By changing the shape of standard factory cases (decreasing the case taper or changing the shoulder geometry) wildcatters generally increase the case capacities of the factory parent cartridge case, allowing more propellant to be used to generate higher velocities. Besides changing the shape and internal volume of the parent cartridge cases, wildcatters also change the original calibers. A reason to change the original caliber can be to comply with a minimal permitted caliber or bullet weight for the legal hunting of certain species of game. Because the 6.5×55mm offers a wide short cartridge case that can be easily reloaded, and hence be reused several times, it has been used by wildcatters. With the 6.5×55mm as the parent case wildcatters have created the 6.5×55mm Ackley Improved. In the 6.5×55mm Ackley Improved the cartridge case capacity is raised to approximately 4.03 ml (62.2 gr H_{2}O). The Ackley Improved family of wildcat cartridges is designed to achieve higher case capacity by rechambering existing firearms, and fireforming the ammunition to decrease body taper and increase shoulder angle.

== See also ==
- 6 mm caliber
- List of rifle cartridges
- List of Swedish military calibers
- Table of handgun and rifle cartridges
- .256 Gibbs Magnum
