= Ahlm =

Ahlm is a surname. Notable people with the surname include:

- Gerda Ahlm (1869–1956), Swedish artist and art conservator
- Johanna Ahlm (born 1987), Swedish handball player
- Marcus Ahlm (born 1978), Swedish handball player

== See also ==
- Alm (surname)
