= ENIC =

The abbreviation ENIC can stand for:

- ENIC Group, British investment company formerly known as English National Investment Company
- European Network of Information Centres, network of centres for recognition of and information on international qualifications in Europe
- Ente Nazionale Industrie Cinematografiche, Italian film production and distribution entity

== See also ==
- Enics, Swiss-based electronics manufacturing services company
