= Västerås =

City in Västmanland, Sweden

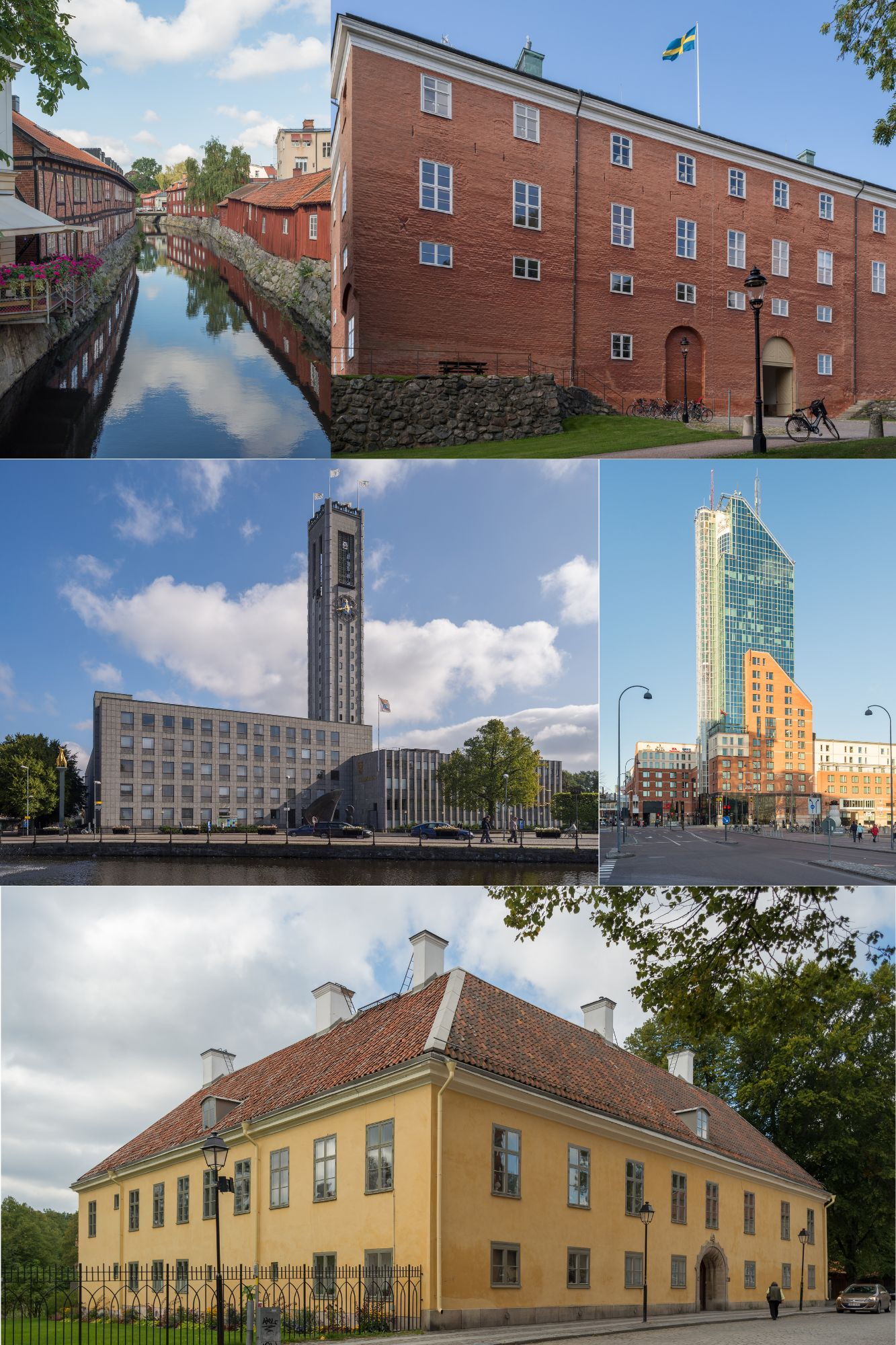
- Clockwise from top left: Half-timbered buildings alongside Svartån river, Västerås Castle, Skrapan, Biskopsgården, Västerås city hall.
- Nicknames: Mälarstaden (The City of Mälaren), Gurkstaden (The Cucumber City)
- Location within Västmanland Location within Sweden
- Coordinates: 59°36′58″N 16°33′10″E
- Country: Sweden
- Province: Västmanland
- County: Västmanland County
- Municipality: Västerås Municipality

Area
  - City: 52.94 km^{2} (20.44 sq mi)
  - Metro: 962.78 km^{2} (371.73 sq mi)
- Elevation: 17 m (56 ft)

Population (2019)
  - City: 127,799
  - Density: 2,094/km^{2} (5,420/sq mi)
  - Metro: 154,049 (Västerås Municipality)
- Time zone: UTC+1 (CET)
  - Summer (DST): UTC+2 (CEST)
- Postal code: 721 00 – 728 20
- Area code: (+46) 021
- Website: www.vasteras.se

Västerås (Swedish: [vɛstɛˈroːs]) is a city in central Sweden on the shore of Lake Mälaren in the province of Västmanland, 110 kilometres (68 miles) west of Stockholm. The city had a population of 127,799 at the end of 2019, out of the municipal total of 158,653, over 100,000 more than the next largest of the 17 localities included in the Västerås Municipality. Västerås is the seat of Västerås Municipality, which is the capital of Västmanland County and an episcopal see.

== History ==
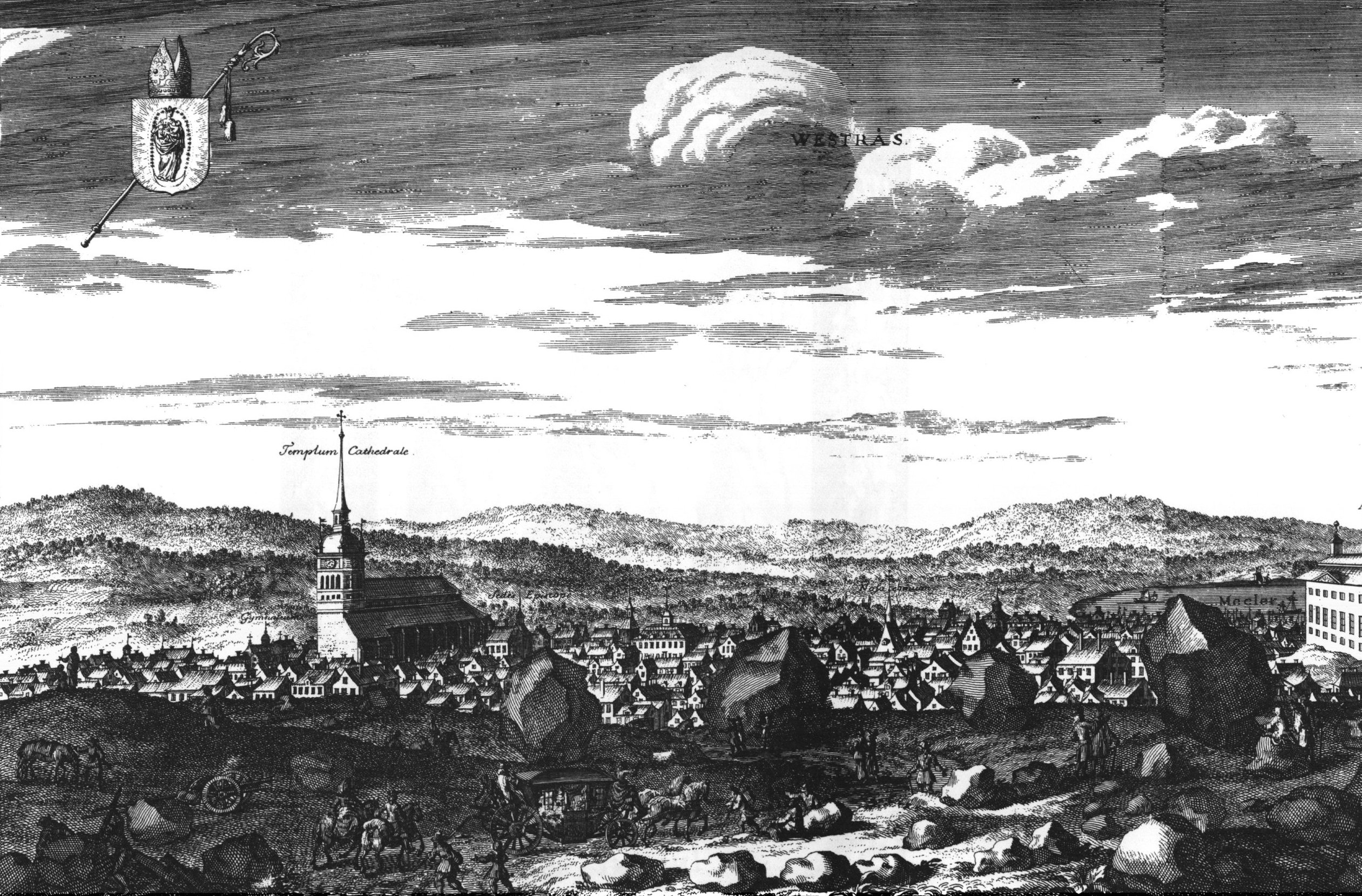
Västerås c. 1700, in Suecia antiqua et hodierna.

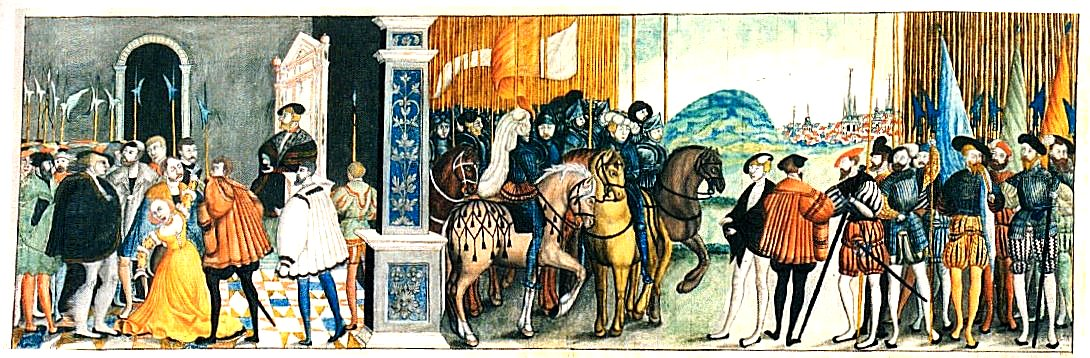
Gustav I of Sweden in Västerås, 1527. Watercolor reproduction from 1722.

Västerås is one of the oldest cities in Sweden and Northern Europe. The area has been populated since the Nordic Viking Age, before 1000 CE. Anundshög, Sweden's largest burial mound, is located just outside the City of Västerås. It was built about 500 CE and is over 68 m (74 yards) wide and is almost 9 m (10 yd) high. In the beginning of the 11th century, Västerås was the second largest city in Sweden; by the 12th century, it had become the seat of the bishop.

The name Västerås originates from Västra Aros ('West Aros'), first recorded as Westraarus in the mid-13th century. In older sources, the city was often called simply Aros 'river mouth', but Västra was added to distinguish it from Östra Aros—the former name of Uppsala. The name reflects its location at the mouth of the Svartån River in Lake Mälaren.

In the ensuing centuries, a cathedral and a monastery were built; the Gothic cathedral, rebuilt by Birger Jarl on an earlier site, and consecrated in 1271, was restored in the 19th century. The first City Arms date from the end of the 13th century. A castle commands the town from an eminence; it was captured by King Gustav I and rebuilt by him, and Eric XIV was confined there from 1573 to 1575. Gustav also called together the riksdag in Västerås. During the riksdag assembly, the decision was made to convert Sweden into a Protestant state and to remove the power of the Catholic Church. Rudbeckianska gymnasiet, the oldest gymnasium (secondary school) in Sweden, was built in Västerås by Johannes Rudbeckius in 1623. In the 18th and 19th centuries, the growing of cucumber became popular, and Västerås received the nickname Gurkstaden (the Cucumber City), which it still retains today.

== Today ==
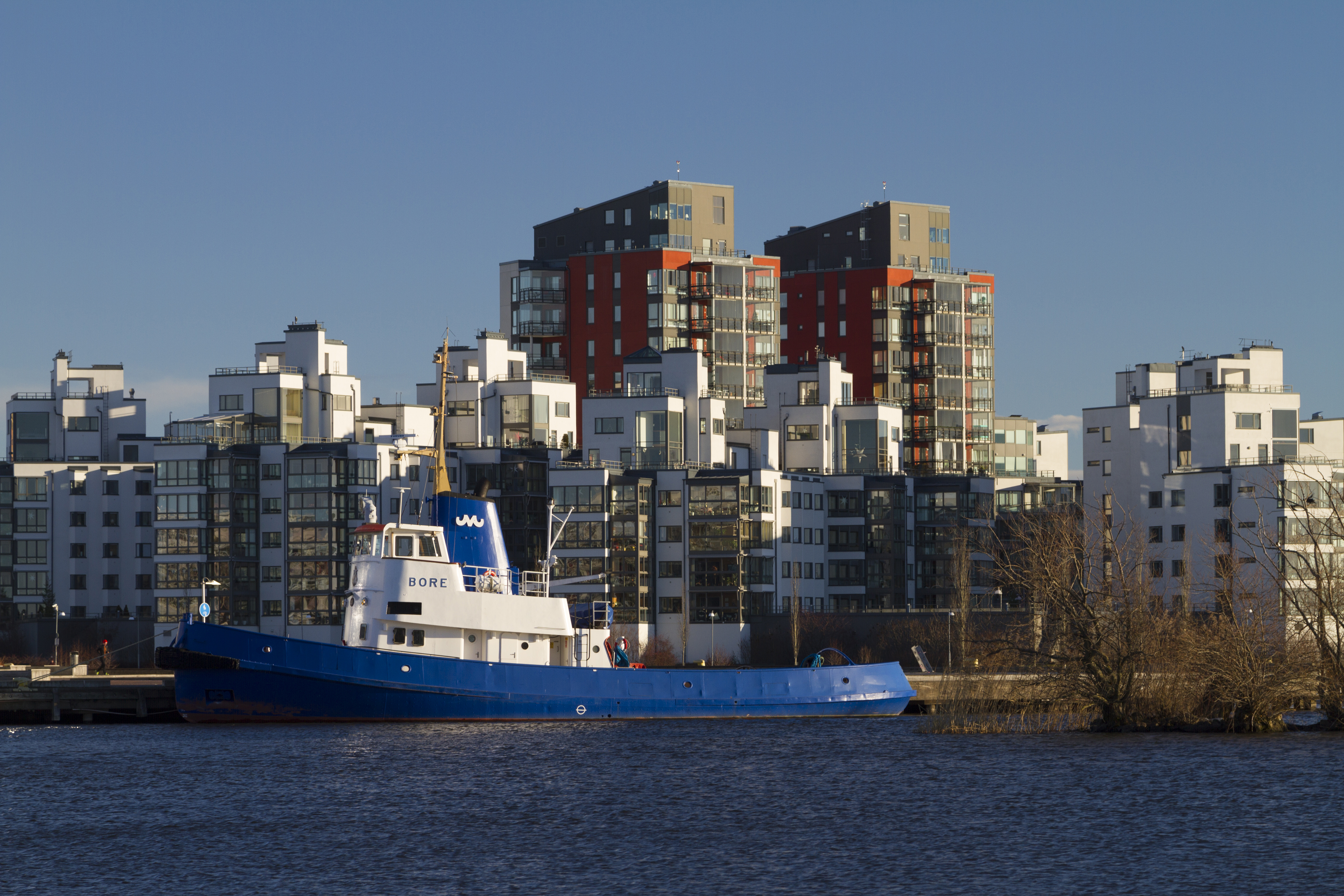
Öster mälarstrand residential area in Västerås harbour.

Västerås is predominantly known as an industrial city, but also a retailing and logistics city. The city wants to distinguish itself as Västerås – Mälarstaden, meaning "Västerås—the city by Lake Mälaren", in order to attract tourists and new residents, as well as students to the local university, Mälardalen University (approximately 16,000 students enrolled in Västerås and in nearby Eskilstuna). To this effect, the city has started using a special logo as branding in some official contexts, partially replacing its coat of arms, as well as rebuilding several old harbor areas to make them more attractive to live in. Västerås has the largest lakeside commercial and recreational port in Scandinavia on Lake Mälaren. The lake has many islands, and there are tourist boats that go out to them daily in the summer. The city also has a skyscraper colloquially nicknamed "Skrapan" (English: The Scraper), which features Sweden's highest-elevation cocktail bar, the Sky Bar, located on the 24th floor. Until 2017, Västerås hosted Power Big Meet, an annual event for owners and enthusiasts of classic American cars. The event moved to Lidköping in 2017 after organizers decided that it had outgrown all the available facilities in Västerås. Long-time Power Big Meet collaborator Klas Brink instead arranged the competing Västerås Summer Meet at the same location as Power Big Meet had been arranged for years.

== Climate ==
According to the Köppen climate classification, Västerås experiences a humid continental climate bordering, according to the original −3 °C (27 °F) isotherm, an oceanic climate (Dfb/Cfb) with cold winters and warm summers. Summers tend to be quite unpredictable with sunny spells but with a risk of sudden showers. The sunniest weather usually occurs when high-pressure systems are blocking the low-pressure systems that usually move in from the Atlantic Ocean. Daytime temperatures in July mostly hover around 22 °C (72 °F), but may sometimes exceed 25 °C (77 °F) and occasionally even 30 °C (86 °F). Winters are usually cold with a snow cover that lasts for several months. Some winters can be mild with longer spells without snow on the ground. The weather differs a lot whether the air masses are coming from the Atlantic Ocean or from the Eurasian continent. In the first case, temperatures over 5 °C (41 °F) might be expected. In the second case, the temperature may not rise above −15 °C (5 °F) in the middle of the day. Lake Mälaren is usually frozen from December until the end of March.

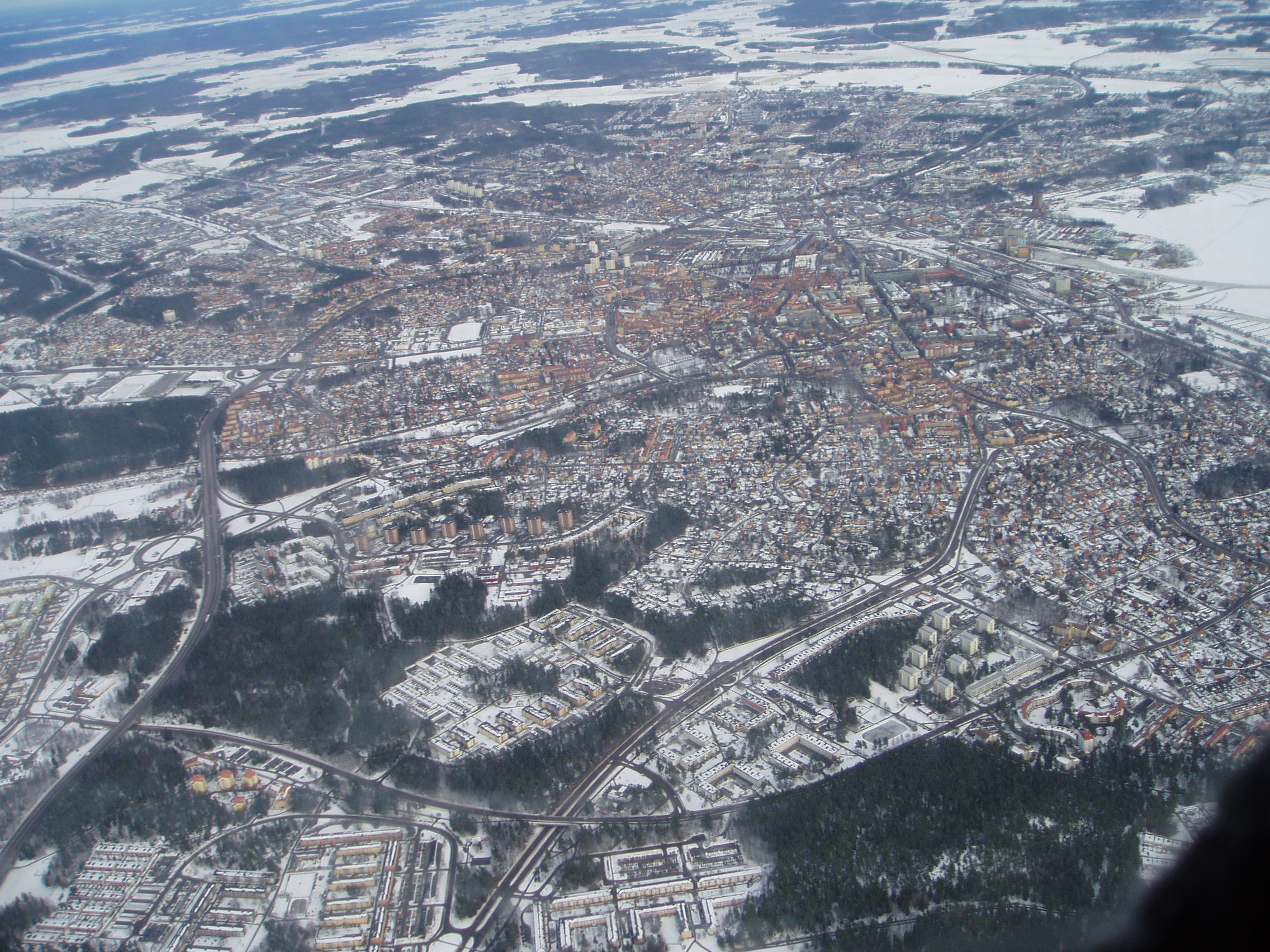
Aerial photo of a wintry Västerås.

The highest official temperature reading of 36.0 °C (96.8 °F) was recorded on 9 July 1966. The lowest temperature of −36.5 °C (−33.7 °F) was recorded on 24 January 1875.

The Åkesta observatory stands 4 km to the north of the town, in Åkesta.

Climate data for Västerås (2003–2018 averages & extremes since 1901)
Month	Jan	Feb	Mar	Apr	May	Jun	Jul	Aug	Sep	Oct	Nov	Dec	Year
Record high °C (°F)	10.2 (50.4)	11.3 (52.3)	19.4 (66.9)	25.9 (78.6)	29.0 (84.2)	33.6 (92.5)	36.0 (96.8)	35.2 (95.4)	27.8 (82.0)	20.5 (68.9)	13.8 (56.8)	12.1 (53.8)	36.0 (96.8)
Mean maximum °C (°F)	6.1 (43.0)	6.4 (43.5)	12.1 (53.8)	18.5 (65.3)	24.1 (75.4)	26.4 (79.5)	28.6 (83.5)	27.4 (81.3)	21.7 (71.1)	15.7 (60.3)	11.3 (52.3)	7.3 (45.1)	29.6 (85.3)
Mean daily maximum °C (°F)	−0.3 (31.5)	0.2 (32.4)	4.5 (40.1)	11.6 (52.9)	16.8 (62.2)	20.1 (68.2)	23.2 (73.8)	21.3 (70.3)	16.7 (62.1)	10.0 (50.0)	5.1 (41.2)	1.8 (35.2)	10.9 (51.7)
Daily mean °C (°F)	−2.8 (27.0)	−2.6 (27.3)	0.6 (33.1)	6.5 (43.7)	11.6 (52.9)	15.2 (59.4)	18.4 (65.1)	17.0 (62.6)	12.8 (55.0)	6.9 (44.4)	2.9 (37.2)	−0.5 (31.1)	7.2 (44.9)
Mean daily minimum °C (°F)	−5.2 (22.6)	−5.3 (22.5)	−3.3 (26.1)	1.3 (34.3)	6.3 (43.3)	10.3 (50.5)	13.5 (56.3)	12.6 (54.7)	8.8 (47.8)	3.8 (38.8)	0.6 (33.1)	−2.8 (27.0)	3.4 (38.1)
Mean minimum °C (°F)	−15.8 (3.6)	−14.8 (5.4)	−11.7 (10.9)	−4.6 (23.7)	−0.4 (31.3)	4.5 (40.1)	8.6 (47.5)	5.8 (42.4)	1.7 (35.1)	−3.6 (25.5)	−7.7 (18.1)	−12.1 (10.2)	−18.8 (−1.8)
Record low °C (°F)	−31.0 (−23.8)	−31.8 (−25.2)	−27.3 (−17.1)	−19.8 (−3.6)	−6.0 (21.2)	−1.4 (29.5)	2.0 (35.6)	0.5 (32.9)	−7.0 (19.4)	−12.0 (10.4)	−19.0 (−2.2)	−27.0 (−16.6)	−31.8 (−25.2)
Average precipitation mm (inches)	45.2 (1.78)	35.2 (1.39)	26.5 (1.04)	31.9 (1.26)	44.5 (1.75)	67.9 (2.67)	71.2 (2.80)	80.1 (3.15)	44.5 (1.75)	56.6 (2.23)	55.7 (2.19)	49.5 (1.95)	608.8 (23.96)
Source: SMHI Open Data

== Demographics ==
Population development in Västerås Municipality 1970–2020
Year	Population
1970	116,725
1975	117,911
1980	117,487
1985	117,706
1990	119,761
1995	123,728
2000	126,328
2005	131,934
2010	137,207
2015	145,218
2020	155,551
2023	159,662
Source: SCB - Folkmängd efter region och år.

== Economy ==
=== Industry ===
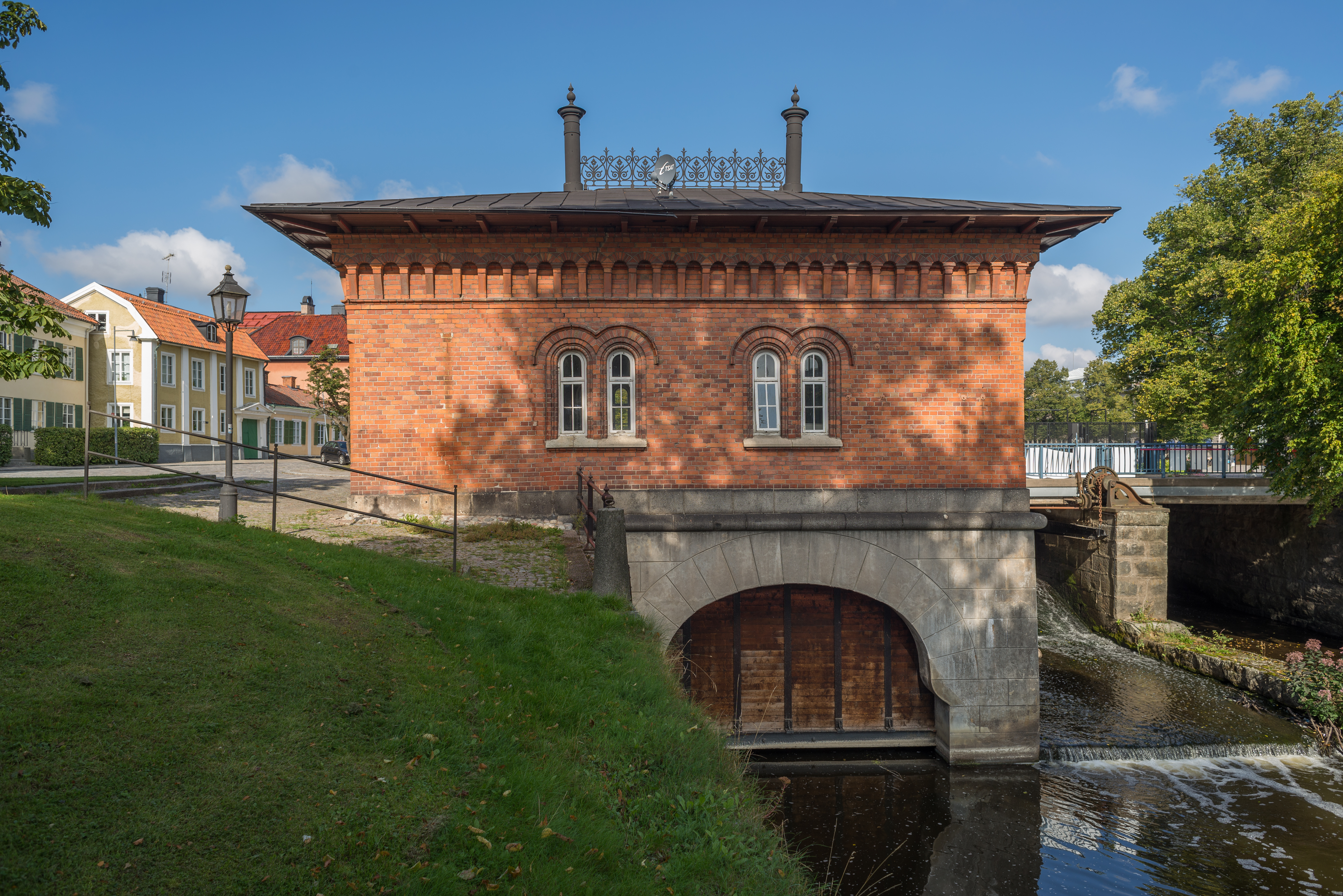
The Turbine House

In 1891, Turbine House, a small hydroelectric dam was built on Svartån, in central Västerås. This early electrification encouraged ASEA, a large electricity equipment manufacturer, to concentrate its operations in Västerås, shifting focus away from Arboga. After the 1988 merger with the power systems company Brown, Boveri & Cie, ASEA became ABB. As a result, Västerås is home to its ABB Swedish subsidiary headquarters. ABB in Västerås maintains production, e.g. robots and drive systems for industry, high-voltage direct current transmission and power grids.

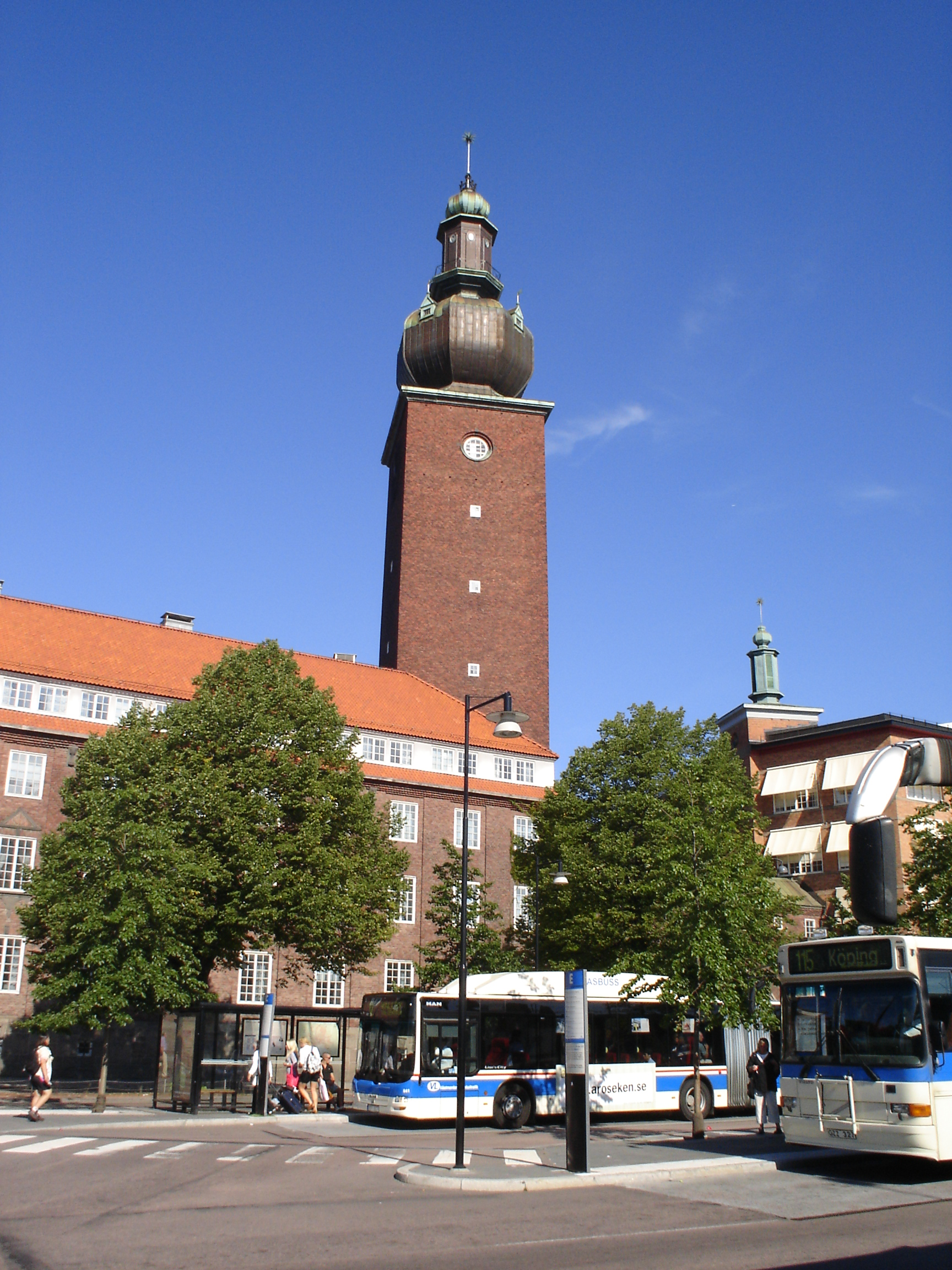
ASEA headquarters

A number of business units have been spun out of ABB. Principal among them is Hitachi Energy (Hitachi). Since the Westinghouse takeover of ABB's nuclear business it is owned by Westinghouse Electric Company. It is situated mainly in Finnslätten, an industrial area in the northern part of Västerås. Westinghouse Sweden produces nuclear fuel and offers nuclear services for Boiling Water Reactors and Pressurized water reactors. As of 2014, Westinghouse Sweden had more than 1000 employees. The plant has provided fuel for Ukraine since 2005. On 11 April 2014, after the Russian annexation of Crimea, the contract with Energoatom for the South Ukraine Nuclear Power Plant was extended through 2020.

Mälarenergi AB is a city-owned district heating and electric power provider for Västerås and surrounding area. Mälarenergi owns and operates a number of plants of which the biggest one is the heat and power plant in Västerås. It is Sweden's largest combined heat and power plant, and the latest unit (number 6) uses waste as fuel. Other major industries include Bombardier Transportation, which is active in railway business with production of propulsion systems for trains with worldwide customers, GE Power Sweden, Enics, Quintus Technologies AB (high pressure metal working and material densification equipment for the manufacturing industry) and Northvolt AB which designs, develops and manufactures lithium-ion battery cells and complete battery systems for electric vehicles, heavy transport, mining, and energy industries, as well as portable devices.

=== Retailing and trade ===
One of the historical reasons that made Västerås a city is its trading-friendly location by the river Svartån and lake Mälaren. The city remains one of the main logistical centers in Sweden due to its central location in the densely populated region Mälardalen and favourable infrastructure connections with railways, waterways and highways. Amongst others, ICA AB has one of its main distribution centres located in Västerås. Västerås is the birthplace of multinational clothing retailer H&M. Their first store was opened in the town centre in 1947. Erikslund Shopping Center, on the outskirts of Västerås, was Sweden's biggest mall until Mall of Scandinavia opened in 2015, and the retail park is the third biggest in sales after Kungens Kurva and Barkarby.

== Sports ==
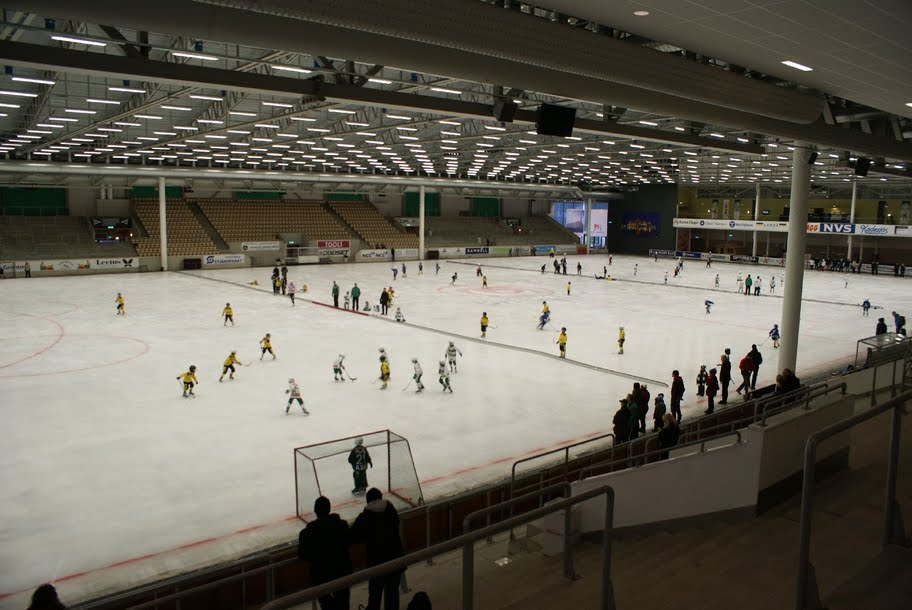
ABB Arena Syd, the largest permanent indoor arena for bandy in Sweden

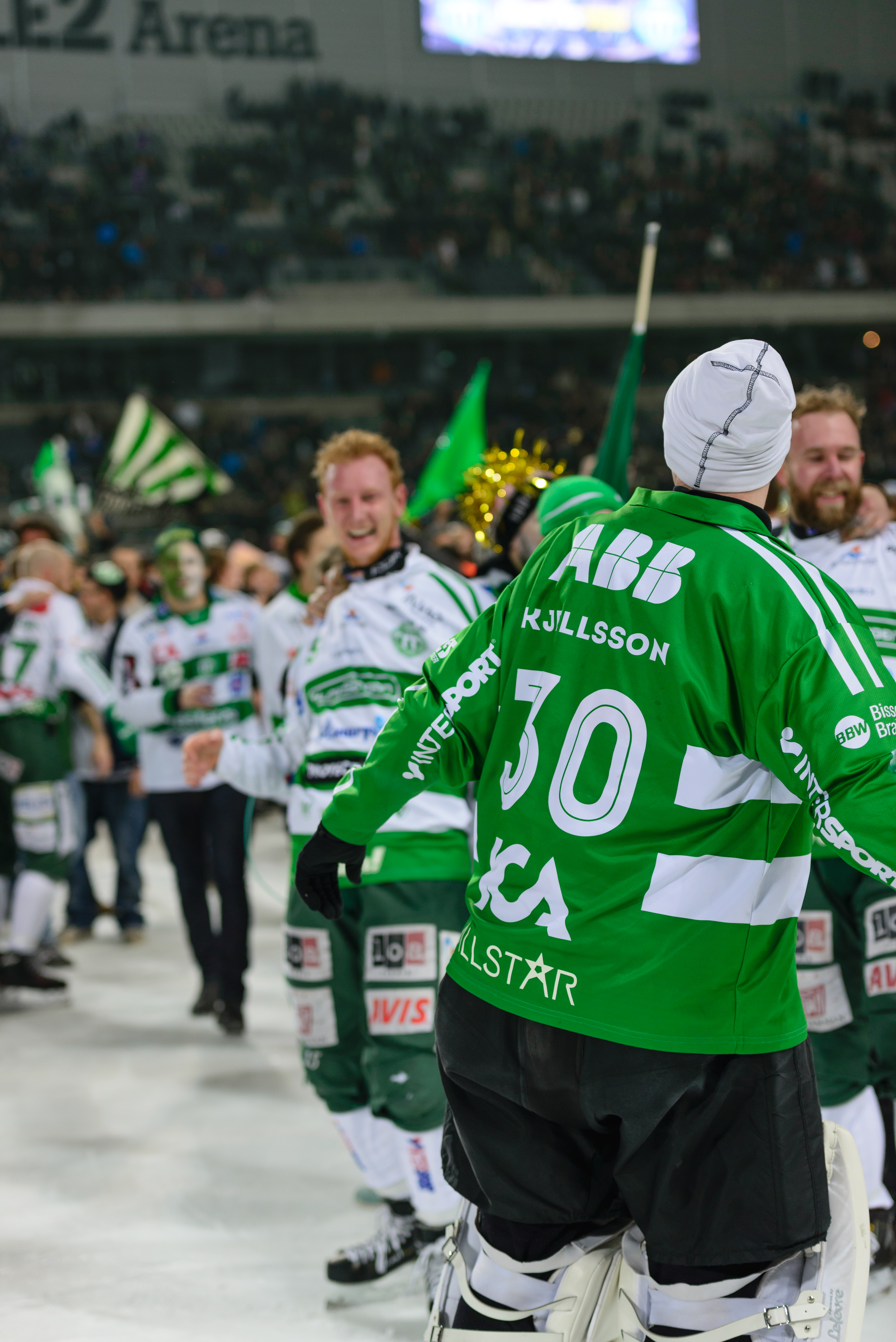
Västerås SK, Swedish champions again in 2015

- De grönvita (The Green and White), Västerås SK – Founded on 29 January 1904, "The Green and White" is the most successful bandy team in Sweden, with 22 Swedish Championships won (20 male, 2 female). They have the largest permanent indoor arena for bandy in Sweden, ABB Arena Syd. The Bandy World Championship has been played in Västerås several times.
- VIK Västerås HK, known as VIK Västerås Hockey Klubb. The club had its greatest moment in 1992/1993 when the club won the regular series in the Swedish Elitleague (VIK reached quarter finals in the playoff). In 2000 the club was relegated from the league and faced a financial crisis. The club was declared bankrupt. During the fall of 2000 the club restarted in the lowest division which the team won. Today (2019) they are playing in Hockeyallsvenskan, the second tier. Among hockey players from Västerås are: Nicklas Lidström, Tommy Salo, Patrik Berglund, Mikael Backlund and many more.
- Västerås SK, in the fall of 2023, the team qualified to the top tier league of Swedish football, Allsvenskan. The last time the club was in the premier division was in 1997.
- IFK Västerås FK, football club in Division 4 Västmanland
- IK Franke, football club in Division 3 Norra Svealand
- Skiljebo SK, football club in Division 2 Norra Svealand
- Västerås IK, football club in Division 4 Norra Svealand
- Syrianska IF Kerburan, football club in Division 3 Norra Svealand
- Gideonsbergs IF football club in Division 3 Norra Svealand

== Notable people ==
- Jonna Adlerteg, gymnast
- Gerda Ahlm, artist
- Carl-Henry Alström, psychiatrist
- Ulf Andersson, chess grandmaster
- Mattias Andréasson, singer
- Axenstar, power metal band
- Mikael Backlund, ice hockey player
- Maria Bonnevie, actress
- Ana Diaz, musician
- Lars Ekborg, comedian
- Embee, hip hop deejay and producer
- Eric XIV of Sweden, king buried in cathedral
- Jens Eriksson, ice hockey player
- Fronda, rapper
- Frida Hansdotter, alpine skier
- Patrik Isaksson, swimmer
- Fredrik Johansson, musician
- Pontus Kåmark, football player
- Dagmar Lange, author under the pen name Maria Lang
- Nicklas Lidström, ice hockey player
- Victor Lindelöf, footballer for Aston Villa F.C. and formerly for Manchester United F.C.
- Magnus Lindgren, jazz musician
- Loreen, singer, winner of the Eurovision Song Contest 2012 and the Eurovision Song Contest 2023
- Maria Montazami, television personality
- Markus Oscarsson, Olympic gold medalists in canoeing 2004
- Pandora, singer
- Stefan Pettersson, footballer
- Promoe, rapper
- Jonny Rödlund, football player
- Pugh Rogefeldt, musician
- Linda Rosing, singer, politician, model
- Tommy Salo, ice hockey player
- Ola Sandström, singer, songwriter and musician
- Bobo Stenson, jazz pianist
- Gary Sundgren, football player
- Åsa Svensson, tennis player
- Esbjörn Svensson, jazz pianist
- Olof Thunberg, actor
- Peter Gustaf Tengmalm (1754–1803), physician and naturalist
- Tomas Tranströmer, poet
- Lars Wallin, fashion designer
- Jesper Wallstedt, ice hockey goalie
- Mai Zetterling, actress and film director

== Transport ==
Air travel for the city is served by Stockholm-Västerås Airport, which is located 7.4 km (5 mi) from the city centre. However, the airport only provides limited destinations such as Spain and the United Kingdom. The nearest Stockholm Arlanda Airport provides more domestic and international destinations, it is located 111 km (69 mi) to the south east of Västerås. Västerås Central Station is located in the city centre which provides direct train links to Stockholm and other parts of South Sweden.

== See also ==
- 2009 Bandy World Championship
- Power Big Meet
