= Svartån =

River in Västmanland County, Sweden

Coordinates: 59.6010°N 16.5468°E

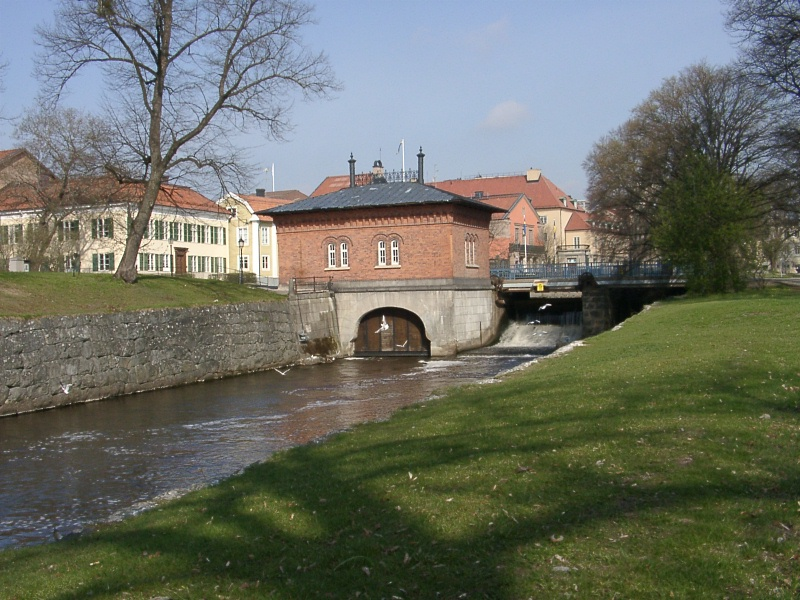
The Turbine House in Västerås, near the mouth of Svartån

Svartån in Västmanland County, Sweden is a river that is 91 kilometers long. It passes through the towns of Skultuna and Västerås and has its outlet in Mälaren. The name Västerås derives from the Sueco-Latin term Västra Aros meaning "western outlet."

The river played an important role in the industrial development in this region from the 17th century until the early 20th century as a source for hydropower. Small-scale hydroelectric dams are located in Västerås (the Turbine House and at Falkenberg's Mill), Skerike, and Skultuna, among others. The river also provided power for the many water wheels associated with Skultuna's centuries-old copper foundry Skultuna mässingsbruk.

The river flooded in September 2023 after heavy rain. In Västerås, barriers were built around the river to protect city buildings from flooding. As the situation began to resolve, excess water drained into Mälaren.

Beavers and crayfish live in the river.
