= Alma Hongell =

Finnish Writer (1849–1935)

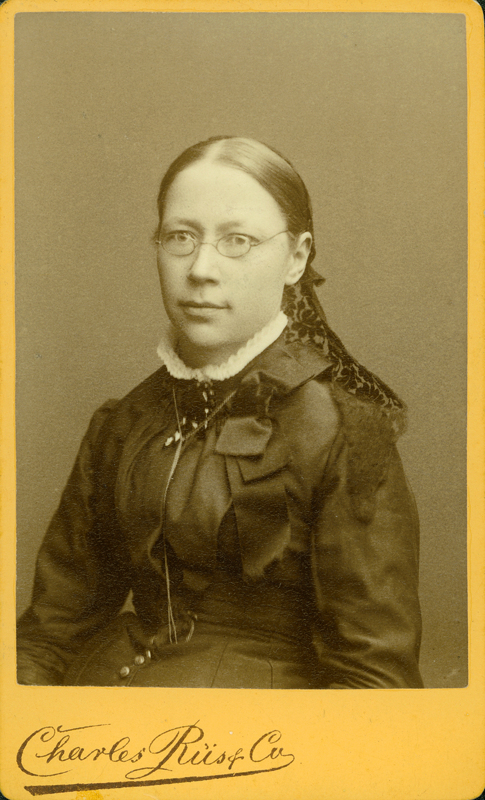
- Youth Photo by Alma Hongell (taken by Charles Riis).
- Born: 15 October 1849 Nykarleby, Finland
- Died: 6 January 1935 (aged 85) Kokkola
- Occupation: Writer

Alma Alexandra Hongell (15 October 1849 Nykarleby – 6 January 1935 Kokkola) was a Finnish teacher and children's literature author who wrote in Swedish. She used the pseudonym A***.

== Life and work ==
At the age of 13, Hongell already worked as a teacher in her hometown Nykarleby and also ran a lending library there. After marrying sea captain Gustaf Hongell in 1877, she moved to Kokkola, where the family had a house at Isokatu 32. In 1890, Gustaf Hongell became the captain of the Vaasa park ship Melusine. In 1895, Melusine went to pick up a cargo of teakwood from the West Indies, and Alma Hongell was also on this trip. On the way back, beriberi broke out on board, killing Captain Hongell and both of his mates. Alma Hongell had to take control of the ship, and in March 1896 she got it safely to Falmouth, England, where the cargo was unloaded, and from there to the home port of Vaasa. In the spring of 1897, the Marine Insurance Association granted Hongelli a small monthly pension of 40 marks and the association's gold merit badge. Hongell wrote several children's books both under her own name and under the pseudonym A***.

== Bibliography ==
Under own name:

- A simple view of life. Lectures and stories / FSN. Appearance. 1; No. 5. Finland's Swedish Temperance Association, Helsinki 1914
- Little Rosa's Birthday and Other Stories for Children. Fram, Vaasa 1918
- Flower. Fram, Vaasa 1919
- The May Queen. Children's library Eos 3. Fram, Vaasa 1919
- My new mother. Children's library Eos 1. Fram, Vaasa 1919
- The little songbird. Children's library Eos 8. Fram, Vaasa 1921
- Primula veris: story. Children's library Eos 10. Fram, Vaasa 1923
- Mother Katrina's Christmas present : Story. Children's library Eos 11. Fram, Vaasa 1924

Under the pseudonym A***:

- The first leaves of A***. Frenckell & Son, Helsinki 1873
- Sobriety stories, translated from the English by A***. Friends of Temperance, Helsinki 1902, 2nd ed. 1904
- Little Rosa's Birthday, story for children by A***. Hope is her library. I, 1. Finnish Swedish Temperance Association, Helsinki 1908
- Old Jakob, story by A***. Lectures and stories / FSN. Appearance. 1; No. 2. Finland's Swedish Temperance Association, Helsinki 1909
- The children at Furuskär, story by A***. Hope is her library. I, 4. Finnish Swedish Temperance Association, Helsinki 1915
