= St. Birgitta's Church =

Church in Nykarleby, Finland

Coordinates: 63°31′21″N 022°31′35″E

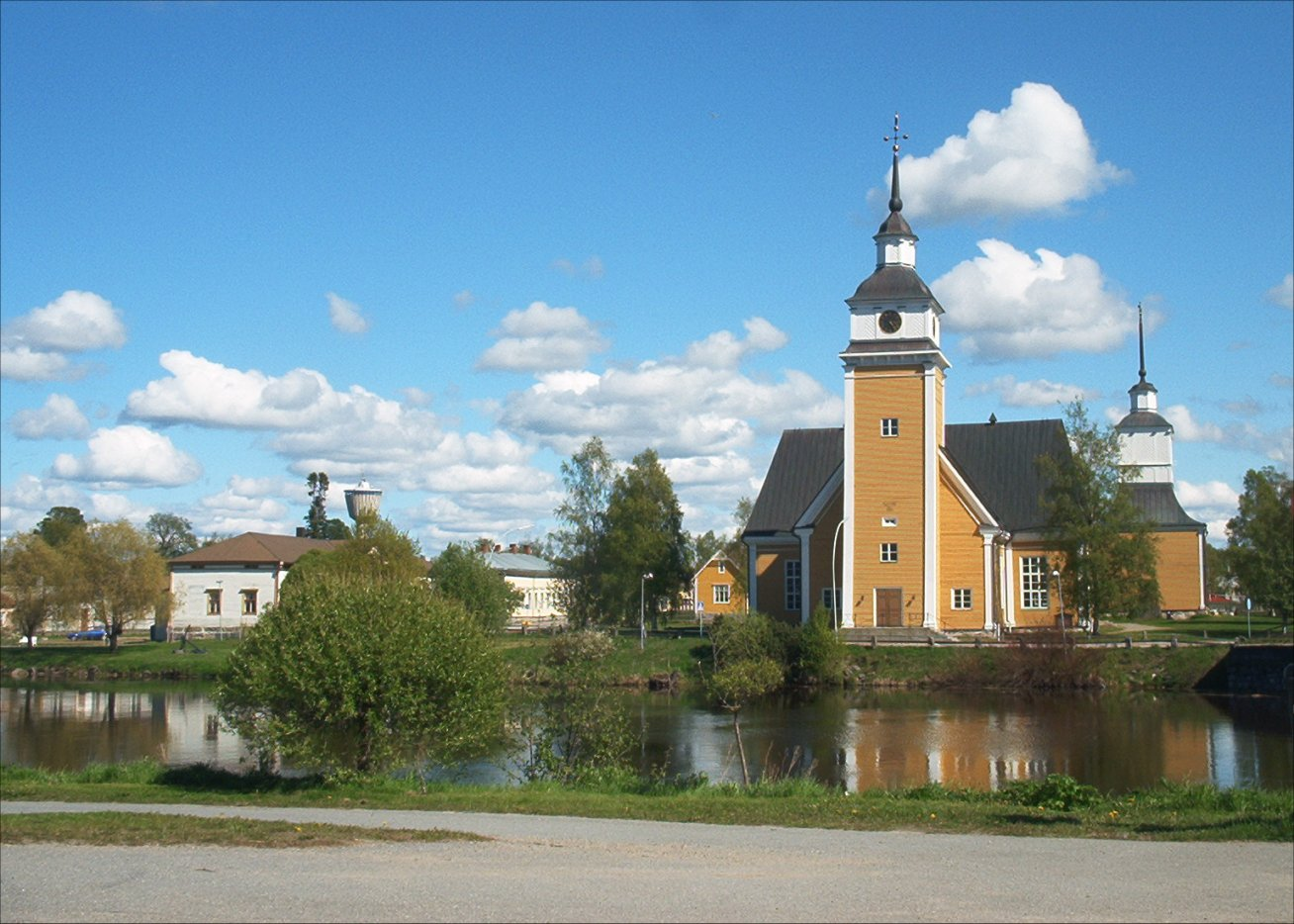
St. Birgitta's Church

St. Birgitta's Church (Swedish: Sankta Birgitta kyrka, Finnish: Uudenkaarlepyyn kirkko) is a wooden church in the city of Nykarleby, Ostrobothnia, Finland. It was built in 1708. Nowadays it is one of the biggest attractions in the city. The ceiling paintings in the church were designed by Daniel Hjulström and Johan Alm and date back to the 18th century.
