= Skrapan, Västerås =

Skrapan
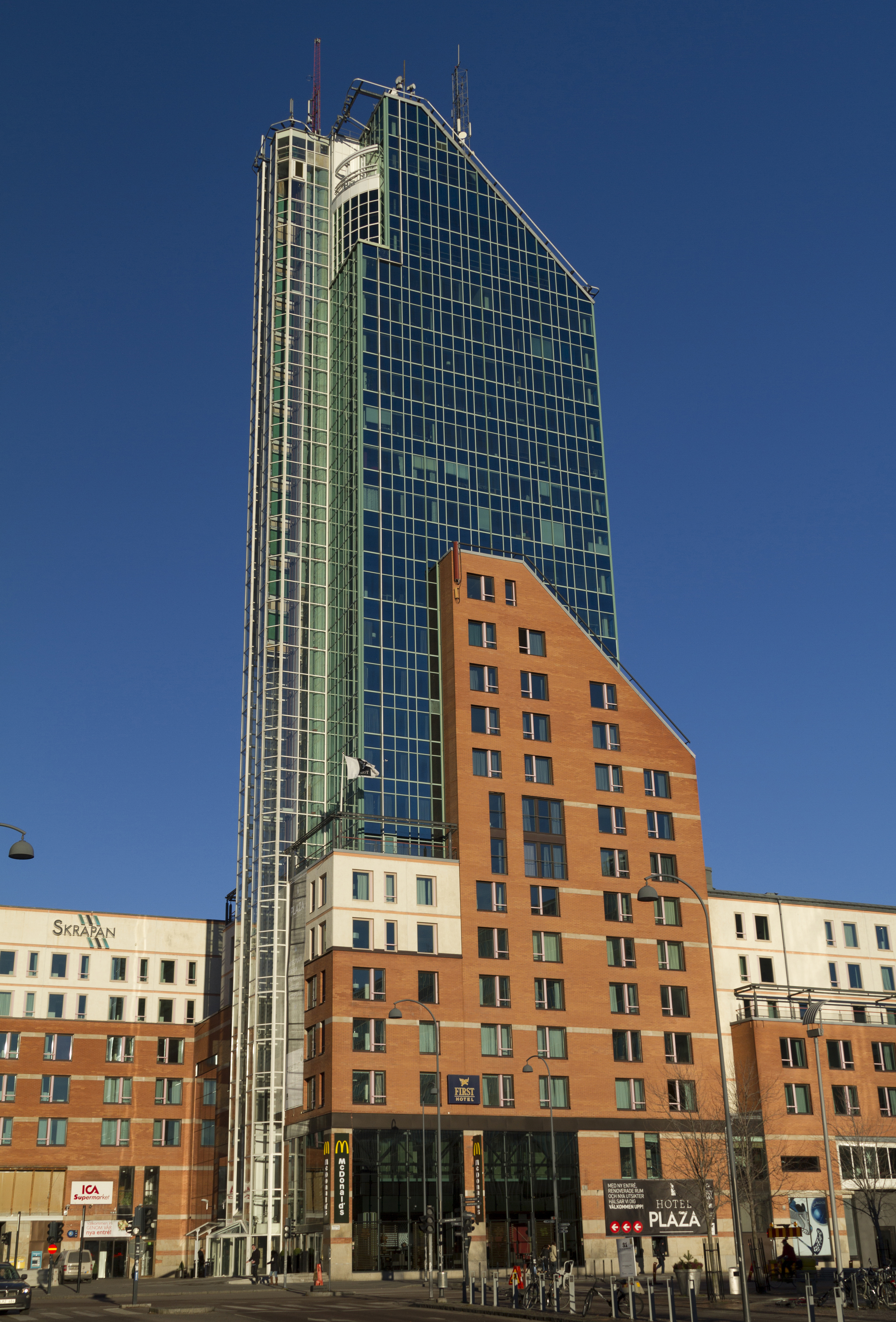
- Skrapan
- Interactive map of the Skrapan area

General information
- Location: Västerås, Sweden
- Coordinates: 59°36′38.70″N 16°32′59.25″E
- Construction started: 1988
- Completed: 1990

Height
- Roof: 81 m (266 ft)

Skrapan ("The Scraper") is the commonly used name for the only skyscraper building in Västerås, Sweden. The building is 81 meters tall and was constructed from 1988 to 1990. At the top of the building is a bar called Skybar with a good view of lake Mälaren.

After the construction in 1990, it was the third tallest building in Sweden.

Currently, it is the fourteenth tallest building in the country.
