= Ola Sandström =

Swedish singer, songwriter and guitarist

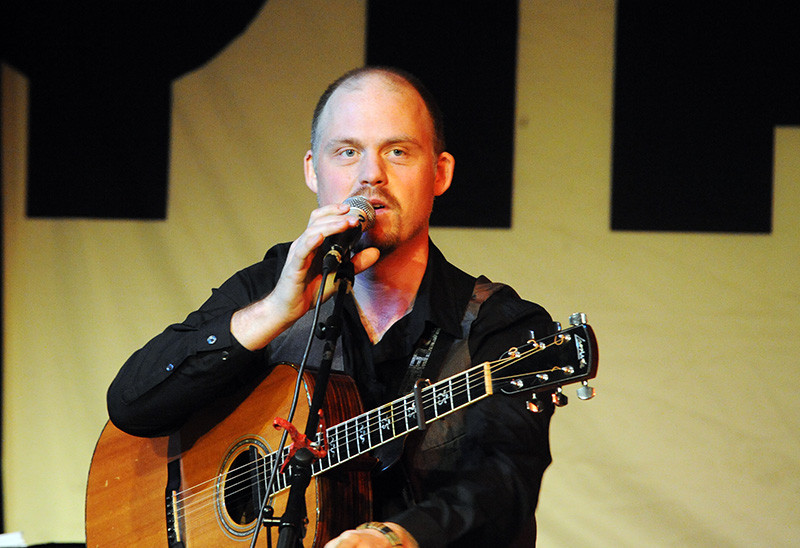

Background information
- Genres: acoustic; folk; alternative
- Instruments: vocals and guitar
- Website: http://olasandstrom.se

Ola Sandström is a Swedish singer, songwriter and guitarist. He is an indie artist mostly into acoustic, folk and alternative music. Besides his musical career, he teaches music at the Stockholm School of the Arts.

Sandström grew up in Västerås, but then moved to Stockholm. He received the Olle Adolphson scholarship and STIM scholarship and for many years appeared at festivals and concert hall and venues around the country. He writes his own original material in addition to musical compositions around texts and translations by others.

He released his album Eldklotter - Ola Sandström sjunger Tomas Tranströmer (shorter title Eldklotter). The lyrics are by Tomas Tranströmer, acclaimed as one of the most important Scandinavian writers of the 20th century. In 2002, when Sandström was studying at Mälardalen University College, Tomas Tranströmer rendered a visit to the university. During the welcoming ceremony, Sandström presented two of his compositions based on Tranströmer text. This went on very well and was well received by the poet and his wife Monica. This encouraged him to compose more works.

The city of Västerås, impressed by the talent and dedication offered Sandström a long-term scholarship for him to continue his project of composition of Tranströmer works. The album is a culmination of this project putting lyrics of 20 shorter poems of Tranströmer to music. The album contains musical renditions, very simple and unadorned, which is one of the poet's signature that Sandström has retained in these performances, yet at the same time giving the lyrics a new life and appeal to new listeners. The compositions show influences of blues, bluegrass, soul and easy listening pop with guitar interludes.

The album, a culmination of Ola Sandström 10-year work from 2002 to 2011, was released on 6 February 2012 on Kakafon Records. It couldn't have come at a more opportune time as Tomas Tranströmer was awarded the 2011 Nobel Prize in Literature.

The album entered the Swedish Albums Chart at #38 on the chart dated 24 February 2012.

== Discography ==
Year	Single	Peak chart positions	Notes
Year	Single	SWE	Notes
2012	Eldklotter - Ola Sandström sjunger Tomas Tranströmer	38	Track list includes: 1. Från mars -79 (1.29); 2. En vinternatt (2.09); 3. Epigram (1.45); 4. Romanska bågar (1.56); 5. Minnena ser mig (1.35); 6. Interlud I (1.02); 7. April och tystnad (1.14); 8. Allegro (2.21); 9. Trädet och skyn (1.07); 10. I Nildeltat (1.51); 11. Näktergalen i Badelunda (1.37); 12. Madrigal (3.30); 13. Interlud II (1.18); 14. Från juli -90 (0.53); 15. Kyrie (1.23); 16. Ansikte mot ansikte (1.46); 17. Air Mail (2.11); 18. Stenarna (1.29); 19. Eldklotter (1.57); 20. Epilog (0.59)
