= Johan Alm =

Finnish painter and field sergeant (1728–1810)

- Born: 18 March 1728; Vaasa, Swedish Finland
- Died: 1810 (aged 81–82); Vaasa
- Children: Immanuel Alm

Johan Alm (18 March 1728 – 1810) was a Finnish painter and vääpeli active in Ostrobothnia, in what was then Swedish Finland. Based in Vaasa, he worked mainly as a church painter during the latter half of the 18th century, painting pulpits and altarpieces in several churches across central Ostrobothnia. He was also known as a furniture painter, continuing an old Ostrobothnian tradition of decorative folk painting.

== Biography ==
Alm was born and lived and worked most of his life in the city of Vaasa. Alm's father was Erik Häggroth, a locksmith from Vaasa. Alm married Anna Catharina Tilgren (1735–1774) in 1757 and after her death he remarried Elisabet Österlund (1733–1805) in 1776.

In 1760, Alm moved with his wife and their two sons from Nykarleby, Ostrobothnia to Vaasa, where he lived for the rest of his life. Alm received his painting license in 1765. During the latter half of the 18th century, Alm worked as a church painter. He painted, among other things, the altarpieces in the churches of Nykarleby and Ilmajoki, the ceiling painting in Nykarleby Church, and the pulpit in Evijärvi Church. Alm's greatest works include the decorative paintings in Kvevlax Church, done in stages between 1761 and 1776, the altarpiece and pulpit in Ilmola Church around 1766, and all the painting work carried out in connection with a major repair in Isokyrö Church in 1770–1774.

Alm was also known as a furniture painter and several of the furniture pieces that he painted can be seen in Ostrobothnian local history museums, especially in the Ostrobothnian Museum in Vaasa. Alm's sons also became painters and continued his decorative tradition. His son Immanuel Alm carried out significant painting work in the churches of Kaustinen and Laihela.
