= Enics =

Swiss Electronics Manufacturing Services provider

- Type: Private
- Headquarters: Zürich, Switzerland
- Area served: Global
- Key people: Elke Eckstein, President and CEO
- Services: Electronics Services from Design Support to Contract Manufacturing to Outsourcing
- Website: www.enics.com

In 2022, Enics merged with Denmark’s largest electronics manufacturer GPV, becoming one of the leading EMS manufacturers with European headquarters.

Enics was an Electronics Manufacturing Services (EMS) provider that specialized in industrial electronics.

Enics was headquartered in Zürich, Switzerland and employed over 3,000 people in 8 manufacturing plants in Europe and Asia.

Enics provided development, support, prototyping, industrialization, manufacturing, product care, spare part production, and repair and maintenance services for the entire life-cycle of its customers’ products.

Enics was ranked number 30 on Manufacturing Market Insider's list of the top 50 EMS providers in the world and was considered one of the largest EMS providers in Europe. Enics had been a member of the United Nations Global Compact since December 2011^{.}

Enics offered the following services: Engineering (electronics design support, NPI, fast prototyping, design for manufacturing, test system development), manufacturing (PCB assembly, box build and system assembly, low-volume production, RoHS services), life extension (component and product care, test system maintenance), after sales (spare parts production, electronics repair, preventive maintenance, recycling services), and supply chain (sourcing, optimization of supply chain, delivery flexibility).

== Operations/Locations ==
Enics had 7 production plants in:

- China (Beijing and Suzhou)
- Malaysia (Johor Bahru)
- Estonia (Elva)
- Finland (Lohja)
- Slovakia (Nová Dubnica)
- Sweden (Västerås)

== History ==
Enics was formed in 2004 as a result of a management buyout of Elcoteq's Industrial Electronics Division. During that same year the company started a new production plant in Elva, located in Southern Estonia, where Enics was the largest employer.

In 2005, Enics acquired Altronix, a part of ABB Västerås’ operations, 2 Flextronics plants in Sweden, Enermet's Jyskä's operations in Finland, and assets from Elcoteq in China. In 2006, Enics’ Beijing facility was officially inaugurated, the 3rd extension in Enics Estonia was completed, and the takeover of activities from ABB Switzerland was finished. Enics acquired assets in Nová Dubnica, Slovakia in 2007. In February 2008, the company established the Enics Hong Kong Sourcing Office and one year later, in February 2009, it acquired the Industrial Electronics Service Unit from Sweco, Finland. In November 2011, Enics signed an agreement for a new facility in Suzhou, China, which began operations in May 2012. In June 2020, Enics announced and began construction of a new manufacturing site in Johor Bahru, Malaysia, that started production in early 2021.

On June 22, 2022, Enics announced they would be merging with another equally sized European electronics manufacturing services provider, GPV. The new combined company would be one of Europe's largest EMS companies with 7,500 employees and a revenue of more than 941 million euros. The merger was subject to regulatory review.

== Structure ==
Enics was a group of electronics manufacturing services (EMS) companies; Enics AG was the parent company of the Enics Group and it owned 100% of its subsidiaries Enics Schweiz AG, Enics Finland Oy, Enics Sweden AB, Enics Eesti AS, Enics Electronics (Beijing) Ltd, Enics Slovakia s.r.o., Enics Hong Kong Ltd, Enics Electronics (Suzhou) Ltd, Enics Malaysia SDN. BHD. and Enics Raahe Oy, together with its wholly owned subsidiary EKC Electronics (Suzhou) Co., Ltd.

The main owner of the company was Ahlström Capital.

== Awards ==
Enics’ subsidiary, Enics Eesti, AS, received an award level in the Estonian Sustainable Business Index in 2007 and 2009.

The Ministry of Education and Research of Estonia recognized Enics Eesti as the most education friendly organization of the year in 2014.
