= Clara Alm =

Swedish footballer

Personal information
- Full name: Clara Alm
- Date of birth: 10 September 1996 (age 30)
- Place of birth: Sweden
- Position: Midfielder

Team information
- Current team: Mallbackens IF
- Number: 5

Senior career*
Years	Team	Apps	(Gls)
2012–	Mallbackens IF	33	(3)
- * Club domestic league appearances and goals as of 7 September 2016

Clara Alm (born 10 September 1996) is a Swedish football midfielder who plays for Mallbackens IF.
