= Nykarleby =

Town in Ostrobothnia, Finland

Nykarleby Nykarleby – Uusikaarlepyy
- Town
- Nykarleby stad Uudenkaarlepyyn kaupunki
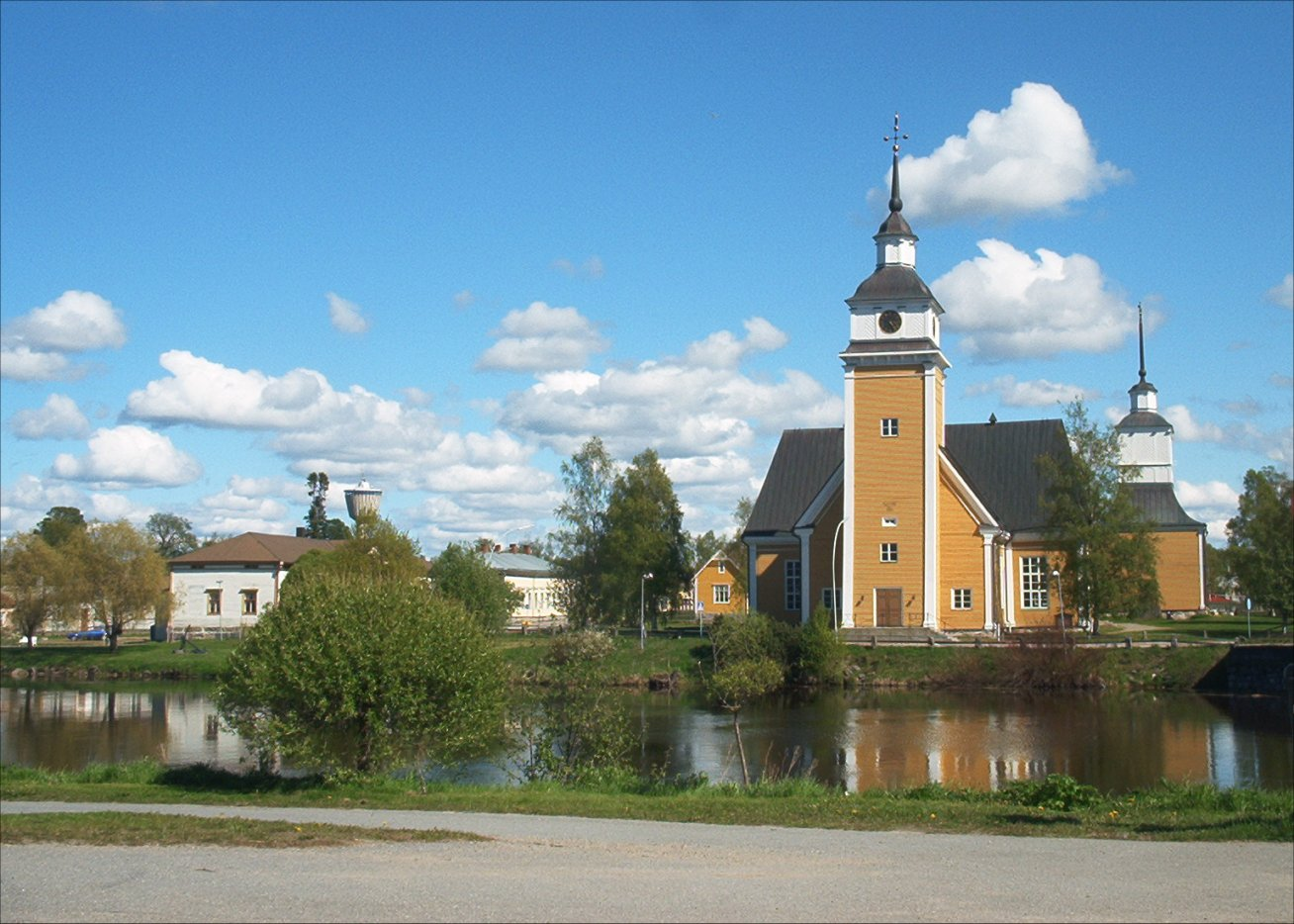
- The St. Birgitta Church in Nykarleby

- Coat of arms

- Location of Nykarleby in Finland
- Interactive map of Nykarleby
- Coordinates: 63°31′N 022°32′E
- Country: Finland
- Region: Ostrobothnia
- Sub-region: Jakobstad
- Charter: 1620

Government
  - Town manager: Thomas Björk

Area (2018-01-01)
  - Total: 1,675.20 km^{2} (646.80 sq mi)
  - Land: 732.83 km^{2} (282.95 sq mi)
  - Water: 942.84 km^{2} (364.03 sq mi)
  - Rank: 117th largest in Finland

Population (2025-12-31)
  - Total: 7,391
  - Rank: 127th largest in Finland
  - Density: 10.09/km^{2} (26.1/sq mi)

Population by native language
  - Swedish: 83.7% (official)
  - Finnish: 6.2% (official)
  - Others: 10%

Population by age
  - 0 to 14: 18.4%
  - 15 to 64: 56%
  - 65 or older: 25.7%
- Time zone: UTC+02:00 (EET)
  - Summer (DST): UTC+03:00 (EEST)
- Website: www.nykarleby.fi

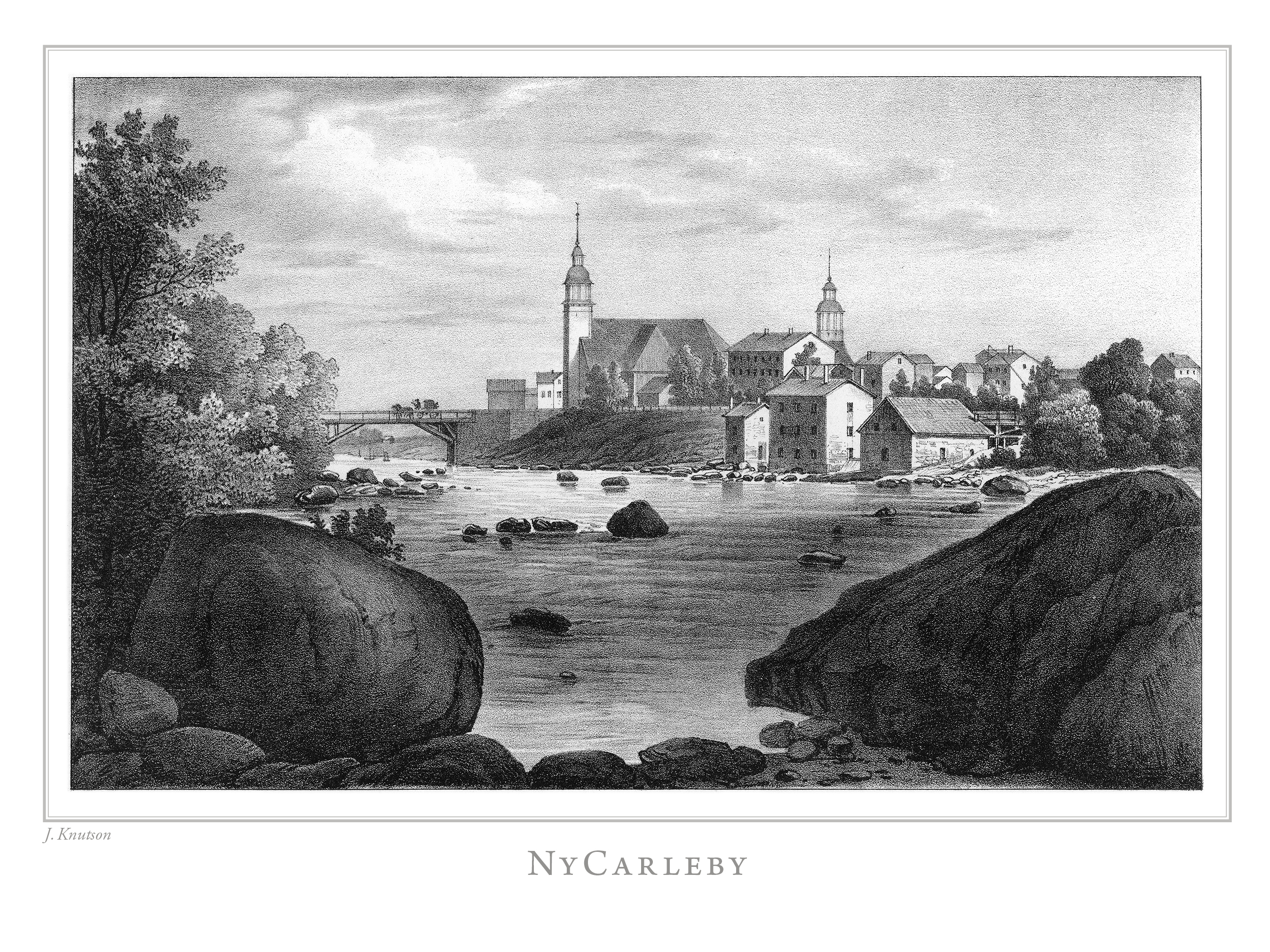
Illustration in Finland framstäldt i teckningar edited by Zacharias Topelius and published 1845-1852.

Nykarleby (Finland Swedish: [nyˈkɑːrleˌbyː]; Finnish: Uusikaarlepyy, Finnish: [ˈuːsiˌkɑːrlepyː]) is a town in Finland, located on the west coast of the country. The town is situated in Ostrobothnia, along the Gulf of Bothnia. The population is approximately 7,000, while the sub-region has a population of approximately 52,000. It is the 127th most populous municipality in Finland.

Nykarleby is a bilingual municipality with Finnish and Swedish as its official languages. The population consists of 6% Finnish speakers, 84% Swedish speakers, and 10% speakers of other languages.

The largest employers in the town are Prevex (member of KWH Group), a packaging and piping products manufacturer, Westwood, which manufactures wooden staircases, and in the village of Jeppo, KWH Mirka, a coated abrasives manufacturer. A Swedish-speaking art school (Svenska Konstskolan) is located in Nykarleby town.

== History ==
The town is located at the mouth of the Lapua River. The name of the place was Lapuan Joensuu or 'mouth of Lapua river'. The municipality was founded in 1607 by merging parts of Pedersöre and Vörå into a new parish. In 1620, the small village of Lepua was chartered as a city, with the Swedish name Nykarleby, which means 'New Karleby'; the Finnish name is a Finnicized version of the same. The town was chartered in the same year as the nearby city of Kokkola, or in Swedish, Gamlakarleby (later, Karleby).

The battles of Nykarleby and Jutas were fought there between Swedish and Russian troops during the Finnish War in 1808.

Zacharias Topelius, an important author in Finland, was born in Nykarleby.

In 1995, the small, idyllic town was ranked as "the happiest city in Finland" in a controversial article in Helsingin Sanomat, the leading newspaper of Finland. Nykarleby has the highest concentration of Ukrainian speakers in Finland.

Population by mother tongue in 2021
1. Swedish (85.3%)
2. Finnish (6.70%)
3. Ukrainian (2.10%)
4. Vietnamese (1.20%)
5. Other (4.70%)

== Politics ==
Results of the 2011 Finnish parliamentary election in Nykarleby:

- Swedish People's Party 63.8%
- Social Democratic Party 24.9%
- Christian Democrats 4.6%
- True Finns 2.0%
- Centre Party 1.6%
- Left Alliance 1.5%
- National Coalition Party 0.7%
- Green League 0.6%

== Notable people ==
List of notable people that were born in, or have lived in, Nykarleby.

- Zacharias Topelius (1818–1898), author
- Erik Bergman (1911–2006), composer
- Gösta Ågren (1936–2020), poet and director
- Leo Komarov (born 1987), ice hockey player
- Sandra Eriksson (born 1989), a middle distance runner
- Rory Penttinen (born 1979), racing driver
- Alma Hongell (1849–1935), children's literature author

== International relations ==
=== Twin towns – sister cities ===
Nykarleby is twinned with:

- Hammel, Denmark
- Steinkjer, Norway
- Sollefteå, Sweden

== See also ==
- Finnish national road 8
- Finnish national road 19
