= James Alm =

Professor

- Born: January 6, 1950 (age 75)
- Occupation: Professor
- Employer: Tulane University

James Alm (born January 6, 1950) is a professor and the Chair of Economics at Tulane University in New Orleans, LA.

Alm's research areas focus on public economics, specifically, tax compliance and tax evasion, the marriage tax, tax and expenditure limitations, tax amnesties, taxpayer responses to tax reforms, enterprise zones, the determinants of state economic growth, and corruption. Alm has also participated in extensive application of his research on fiscal reforms in numerous countries, including Bangladesh, Jamaica, Grenada, Indonesia, Turkey, Hungary, China, Egypt, the Philippines, Russia, Uganda, Nigeria, India, Colombia, Nepal, Ukraine, Pakistan, and South Africa. Alm's international projects have been funded by the World Bank, the U.S. Agency for International Development, the United Nations Development Program, and the International Monetary Fund.

Alm is the Editor of Public Finance Review and various journal editorial boards. Alm has been published in various respected journals including, The American Economic Review, The Journal of Economic Perspectives, The Review of Economics and Statistics, Economica, Economic Inquiry, Southern Economic Journal, Journal of Public Economics, Journal of Urban Economics, Journal of Development Economics, Journal of Human Resources, National Tax Journal, Public Finance Review, International Tax and Public Finance, Public Choice, Public Finance/Finances Publiques, and Journal of Policy Analysis and Management. His work has also been included in the Washington Post, the Wall Street Journal, the Boston Globe, Forbes, Business Week, and Bloomberg.

Prior to going to Tulane University as Chair of the Department of Economics, Alm served as chair of economics department in the Andrew Young School of Policy Studies at Georgia State University and also as Dean of the Andrew Young School. Alm additionally taught at Syracuse University and at the University of Colorado at Boulder. He earned his master's degree in economics at the University of Chicago and his doctorate at the University of Wisconsin-Madison.

Alm has been ranked among the world's top economists by IDEAS/RePEc.
