= John R. Alm =

American businessman

- Born: February 25, 1946
- Died: 2022
- Occupation: Retired
- Known for: Former President of Coca-Cola Enterprises

John R. Alm (1946–2022) was a former president and chief executive officer for Coca-Cola Enterprises.

== Career ==
Alm obtained a bachelor's degree in accounting at the University at Buffalo.

He worked for both Price Waterhouse and 20th Century Fox before being hired by the Johnston Coca-Cola Bottling Group as senior vice president and chief financial officer in 1980.

11 years later, in 1991, the Johnston Coca-Cola Bottling Group merged with Coca-Cola Enterprises where Alm became vice president and kept his job as chief financial officer. After the two merged it was in 1996 when he was elected as senior vice president. Then in 1997 he was promoted to executive vice president and in April 1999 promoted to principal operating officer. In 2004 he was promoted to chief executive officer. One year later in 2005 Alm became the president of Coca-Cola Enterprises. Since 2001, Alm was part of the board of directors for Coca-Cola Enterprises until he retired from the company on January 1, 2006.

Alm then joined the board of Kimberly-Clark in February 22, 2006.
