= Elcoteq =

Finnish company

Insurance
- Company type: Contract manufacturer
- Traded as: Nasdaq Helsinki: ELQAV
- Industry: EMS
- Founded: 1984
- Defunct: 2011
- Headquarters: Luxembourg
- Key people: Jouni Hartikainen CEO
- Website: www.elcoteq.com

Elcoteq SE was a Finnish consumer electronics contract manufacturer, EMS, and ODM company headquartered in Luxembourg. The company filed for bankruptcy protection in Luxembourg on October 6, 2011.

It was a manufacturer of the BlackBerry and also performed repair and refurbishment services.

== History ==
Founded in 1984 as a microelectronics unit of the Lohja Corporation, the company became independent in an early 1990s management buyout.

Elcoteq made an IPO on the Helsinki Stock Exchange in November 1997.

It manufactured the ill-fated Microsoft Kin for Sharp Corporation in the late 2000s.

On October 6, 2011, Elcoteq filed for bankruptcy in Luxembourg. The loss of a major client, Nokia, to Asian sourcing outfits may have been a contributing cause.

=== Production base expansion ===
Its original production base was in Lohja, Finland, and in 1992 it established an Estonian base. By 1999 had expanded production to include non-European bases, too.

=== Name ===
Representing electronics, contract manufacturing, and technology, Elcoteq was the company's second choice after Finnish regulators would not allow it to register the name Mikrotec.

== Clients ==
The first Elcoteq customers were Ericsson and Nokia. Other clients have included:

- Aastra
- Ascom
- EADS
- Funai
- Huawei
- Humax
- Marconi Electronic Systems
- Nokia Siemens Networks
- Philips
- Research In Motion
- Sharp Corporation
- Siemens
- Sony Ericsson
- Swissvoice
- Tellabs
- Thomson SA

== Production bases ==
Elcoteq has had production bases in Brazil, China, Estonia, India, Hungary, Romania, and Mexico.
