= Copper units of pressure =

Copper units of pressure or CUP, and the related lead units of pressure or LUP, are terms applied to pressure measurements used in the field of internal ballistics for the estimation of chamber pressures in firearms. These terms were adopted by convention to indicate that the pressure values were measured by copper crusher and lead crusher gauges respectively. In recent years, they have been replaced by the adoption of more modern piezoelectric pressure gauges that more accurately measure chamber pressures and generally give significantly higher pressure values. This nomenclature was adopted to avoid confusion and the potentially dangerous interchange of pressure values and standards made by different types of pressure gauges. For example, it makes little sense to describe a maximum pressure as 300 MPa, and in case the pressure has been measured according to the CUP procedure it should be denoted as 300 MPa (CUP).

Pressure is a fundamental physical parameter that is defined as force divided by area. The unit of pressure in the modern International System of Units is the pascal (equivalent to the newton per square metre). A chamber pressure measured with a copper crusher gauge would therefore be expressed in MPa (CUP) in the ISU.

== Methodology ==
Estimation of pressure using CUP and LUP units is performed by a special crusher gun, which uses pressure applied to a piston to crush a carefully manufactured and calibrated copper or lead cylinder. The amount of deformation is compared to the amount of crushing produced by different pressures. Copper cylinders are used at high pressures, such as are generated by most handgun and rifle cartridges, and lead cylinders are used for low pressures such as are generated by shotgun shells. The crusher gun has a hole in the chamber that is linked to a piston, and upon firing, this piston is subjected to the pressure of firing. The piston then acts on the calibrated cylinder, crushing it slightly. The length of the crushed cylinder is measured and compared to a chart of lengths resulting from crushing cylinders with given amounts of pressure, and the corresponding force is the CUP or LUP pressure value. The American standards organisation Sporting Arms and Ammunition Manufacturers' Institute (SAAMI) published CUP pressure level standards for many cartridges.

== Comparing units ==
While CUP and LUP numbers were intended to be comparable to the crushing power of a given pressure, the numbers are not equivalent. Since a longer duration, lower pressure pulse can crush the cylinder as much as a shorter duration, higher pressure pulse, CUP and LUP pressures frequently register lower than actual peak pressures (as measured by a transducer) by up to 20 %. For example, the SAAMI maximum pressure for the 7.62×51 mm is given as 430 MPa; the .45-70, on the other extreme, is listed as 190 MPa. SAAMI standards for a given cartridge are expressed in MPa.

Although no accurate conversion formulas are possible, for converting between true pressures and crusher indicated pressures, linearised approximation conversion equations do exist over narrow ranges of pressures for estimating piezo pressure readings given crusher pressures.

For example, Denton Bramwell has published a conversion approximation formula, covering only SAAMI crusher pressures between 28,000 and 54,000 CUP:

piezo = 1.52 × crusher − 18,000

Likewise, there is a conversion approximation formulas for estimating between CIP (European) crusher pressures (which are recorded in multiples of 50 bar) and piezo ratings, consistent with different assumptions for CIP vs. SAAMI crusher test conditions:

piezo = 1.21 × crusher − 2.8

== CUP and LUP pressures vs. transducer pressures ==
Until the invention of measurement transducers in the 1960s, crusher guns were the only reliable method for estimating chamber pressures. With the availability of inexpensive, reliable transducers since the 1960s for actually making chamber pressure measurements, the industry almost universally has begun to move away from crusher guns for estimating chamber pressures, towards favouring making actual measurements. Transducers are also faster to use in practice, as they do not require the careful measuring of the copper or lead cylinders after firing. Additionally, transducers are capable of recording instant-by-instant pressures through the entire firing cycle. Hence, in the long run, using a transducer is less expensive, as it does not require using expendable metal cylinders in a crusher gun, and also reduces the labour required to analyse test results.

One outcome from this transition to using measurement transducers is, for example, that a Speer reloading manual from 1987 lists all SAAMI pressures in CUP, while current references list nearly all pressures in MPa. Another outcome is that design margins are now better determined, which has the effect of increasing the long-term safety of firing multiple thousands of rounds in a gun. With estimates based on crusher guns, actual safety margins could never be accurately assessed, short of actually firing tens of thousands of rounds in a sample gun.
