= Gerda Ahlm =

Swedish artist (1869–1956)

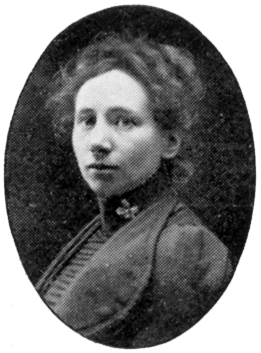
Gerda Maria Ahlm

Gerda Maria Ahlm (May 24, 1869 – 1956) was a Swedish-born painter and art conservator.

== Biography ==
Gerda Maria Ahlm was born in Västerås, Sweden. She studied at the Royal Swedish Academy of Art in Stockholm (1889-91) and later studied etching with the engraver Axel Tallberg (1896). She made several trips around Europe for further study in the years between 1892 and 1900. She studied at the Académie Colarossi in Paris and traveled in Italy, England, Norway, and Belgium.

Becoming interested in restoring art, she trained in art conservation with F. C. Sessig at the Alte Pinakothek in Munich. Her skill and reputation were such that she gained a number of important commissions, including restoring family portraits belonging to Queen Victoria of Sweden.

In 1903, she emigrated to the United States and took up a position as assistant restorer at the Metropolitan Museum in New York. She eventually settled in Chicago, where she worked as an art conservator for the Art Institute of Chicago as well as other art institutions and private collectors, becoming one of her adopted country's top conservators. She continued to exhibit her own paintings of landscapes, domestic interiors, and portraits of women executed in a loosely Impressionist style.

Ahlm was a member of the Swedish women's association Nya Idun.
