= Immanuel Alm =

Finnish painter (1767–1809)

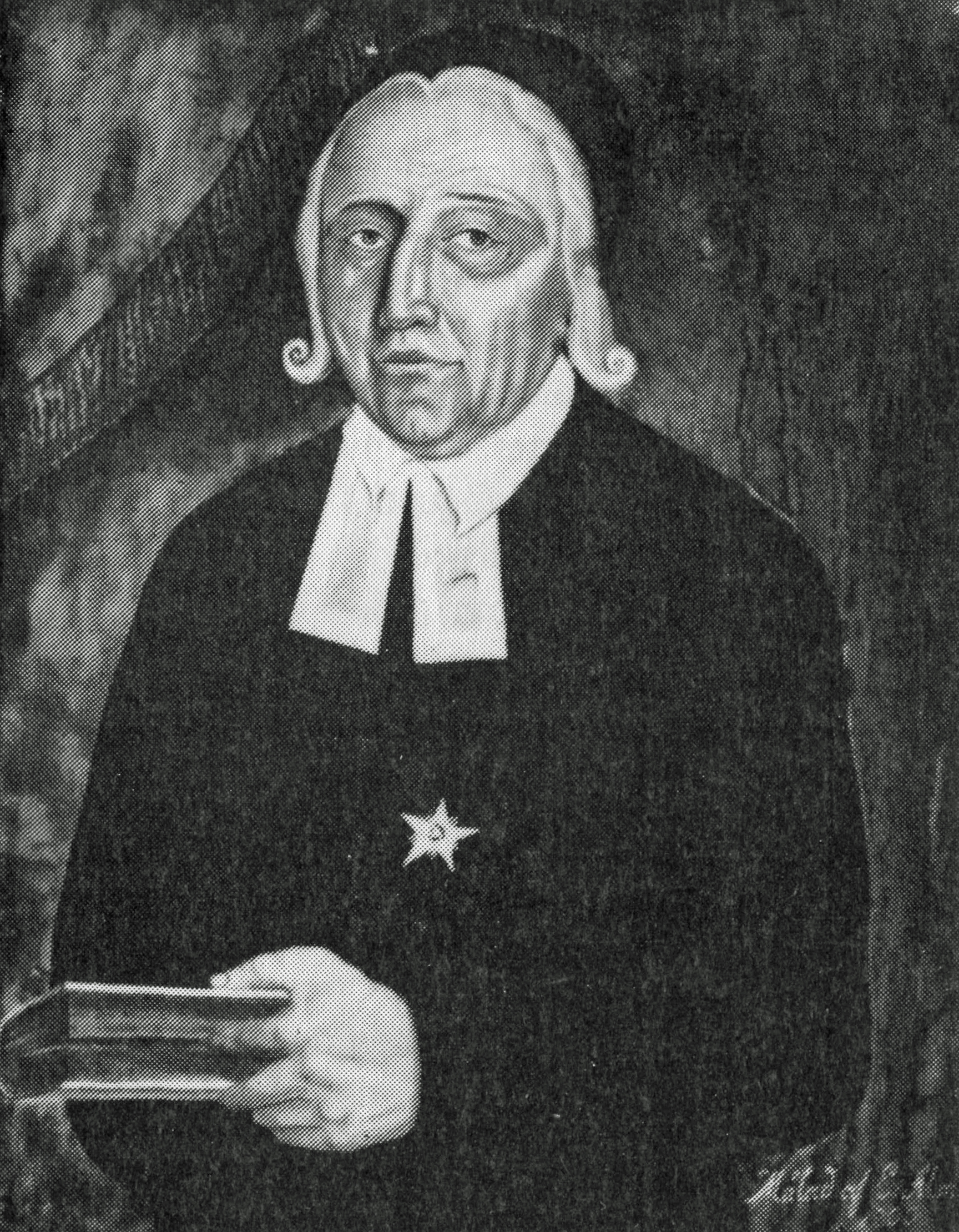
Dean Anders Chydenius by Immanuel Alm, Kaustby church, 1800

Immanuel Alm (1767–1809) was a Finnish painter.

Alm's father Johan Alm was also a painter. They both worked on religious-themed paintings, including altarpieces such as one at the church in Kaustinen. The National Museum of Finland also has some of his works.
