= Josef Alm =

Swedish historian

Josef Alm (1889–1957) was a Swedish weapon historian. He is most known - at least in Norway - for repeating and spreading a false rumour that there was a significant difference between the 6.5x55 ammunition used in Norway and Sweden, although the ammunition in reality is interchangeable. After the rumour first surfaced in 1900, it was examined by the Swedish military. They declared the difference to be insignificant, and that both the Swedish and Norwegian ammunition was within the specified parameters laid down. Despite this finding, Josef Alm repeated the rumour in a book in the 1930s, leading many to believe that there was a significant difference between the two types of ammunition. Alms's survey was originally published in Sweden in 1947. It provides a detailed survey of the development of the European crossbow.
