= List of tallest buildings in Stockholm =

Skyline of Stockholm Stockholms silhuett
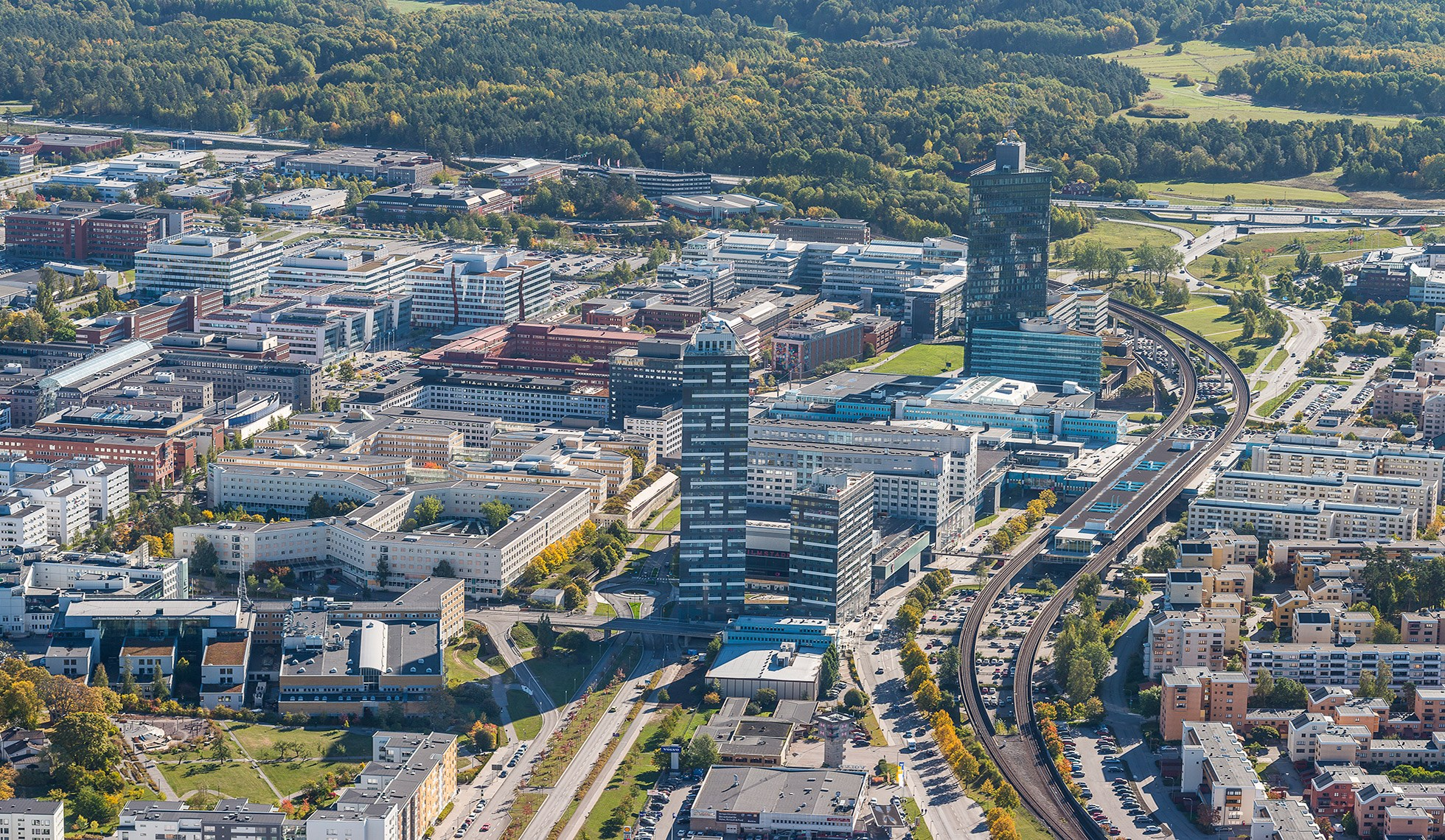
- Aerial view of Kista in 2018
- Tallest building: Kista Science Tower (2003)
- Tallest building height: 124 m (407 ft)

Number of tall buildings (2026)
- Taller than 75 m (246 ft): 15
- Taller than 100 m (328 ft): 6

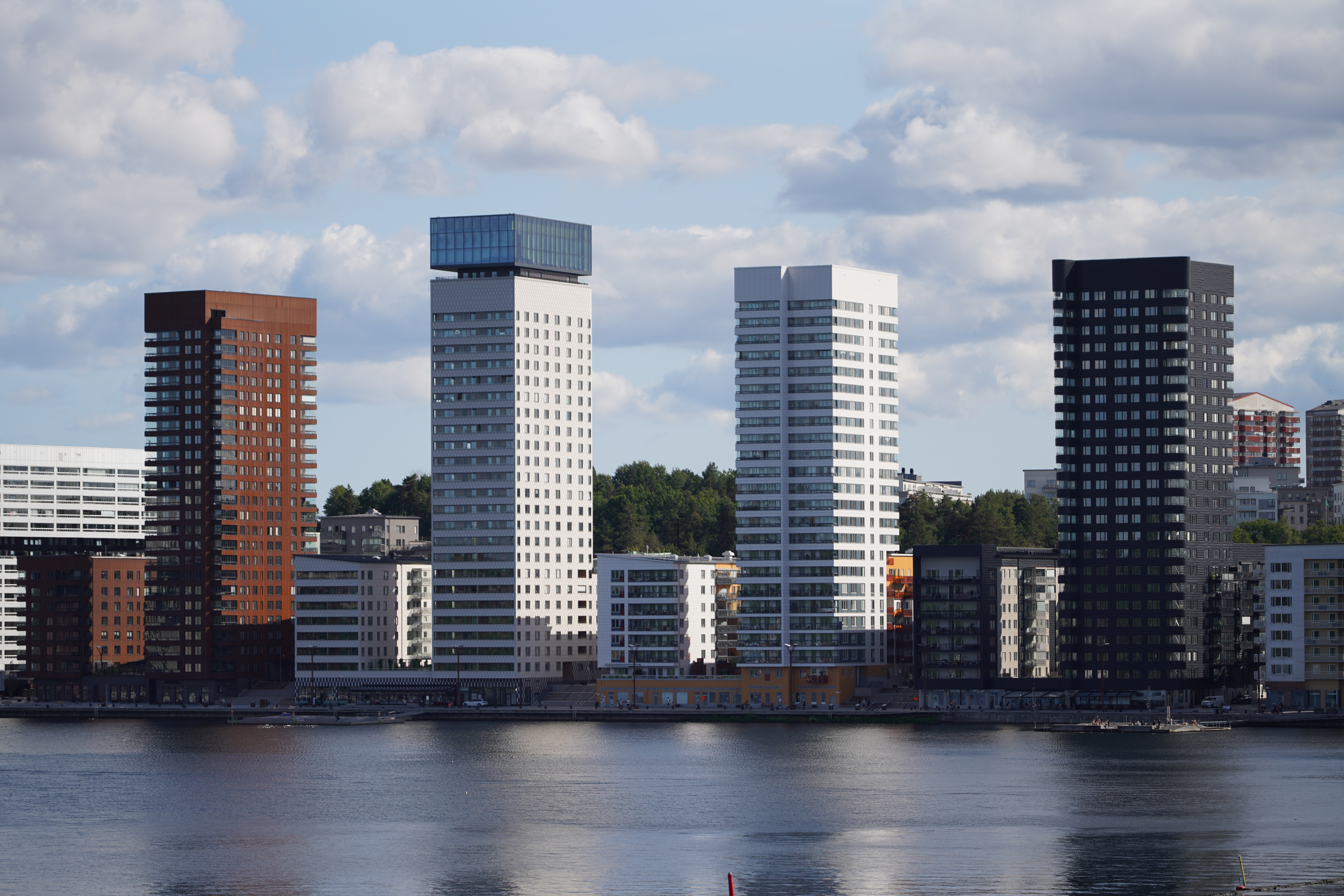
The Liljeholmskajen neighbourhood in 2023.

Stockholm is the capital and largest city of Sweden, with a population of 2.5 million in its metropolitan area. The tallest building in Stockholm is the Kista Science Tower, an 32-storey office building with a height of 124 m (407 ft) in the Kista district. Despite Stockholm being the largest city in Sweden, Kista Science Tower is only the third tallest building in the country, after Karlatornet in Gothenburg and the Turning Torso in Malmö. Regardless, Stockholm has the most high-rises of any city in Sweden, with over 130 such structures as of 2026, six of which stand taller than 100 m (328 ft).

Before the 20th century, most of the tallest structures in Stockholm were church spires. The tallest of these belonged to the Klara Church, which reached a height of 116 m (380 ft). The first high-rises in Stockholm, the twin buildings of Kungstornen (Swedish for King's Towers), were constructed from 1919 to 1925 on both sides of the Kungsgatan. The 16 and 17-storey buildings were among the first high-rises in Europe, with their design influenced by the skyscrapers of Lower Manhattan in New York City. In the late 1950s, two significant commercial high-rises were completed on the island of Södermalm: Skatteskrapan, which was built for the Swedish National Tax Board, and Folksamhuset, headquarters of insurance company Folksam.

Skatteskrapan remained the tallest high-rise in the city until 1997, when the 86 m (282 ft) postmodern style Söder Torn was built on the same island. The 21st century has seen an increase in high-rise development in Stockholm. Kista, a district in northwestern Stockholm, emerged as an IT and technology hub in the late 20th century. The Kista Science Tower was completed in 2003, and was joined by the Scandic Victoria Tower in 2011 and Kista Torn in 2015, then the city's second and third tallest buildings. Norra Tornen (Northern Towers), a pair of high-rise apartment buildings, was completed in 2020, serving as the landmark of the new Hagastaden district. The taller building, Innovationen, is the second-tallest building in Stockholm at 121 m (395 ft). Liljeholmskajen is a newly developed area that features four adjacent residential towers.

The tallest buildings in Stockholm, besides the high-rises of Kista, are relatively spread out throughout the city. None are in the historic areas of Gamla Stan, Norrmalm, and Östermalm. The tallest structure in Stockholm is the Kaknästornet, a 155 m (509 ft) tall telecommunications tower formerly open to the public.

== History ==
Number of buildings by height in Stockholm by the end of each year, based on the information in this article. Click on the legend to toggle a specific height on or off. View chart definition.

== Maps of tallest buildings ==
The maps below show the locations of buildings taller than 75 m (246 ft) in Stockholm. Each marker is numbered by the building's height rank, and coloured by the decade of its completion.

=== Central Stockholm ===
With the exception of the high-rises in Kista, the tallest buildings in Stockholm are within the Stockholm Ring Road.

Buildings taller than 75 m (246 ft) in central Stockholm.
- 1950s and before
- 1960s
- 1970s
- 1980s
- 1990s
- 2000s
- 2010s
- 2020s
1 Kista Science Tower
2 Innovationen
3 Scandic Victoria Tower
4 Helix
5 Kista Torn
6 Sthlm 01
7 Kajen 6
8 Skatteskrapan
9 Söder Torn
10 Dagens Nyheter Tower
11 Kajen 7
12 Folksamhuset
13 Kajen 5
14 Wenner-Gren Center
15 Beundra

=== Kista ===
Kista, located in the northwest of Stockholm, contains three of the city's five tallest buildings.

Buildings taller than 75 m (246 ft) in Kista.
- 2000s
- 2010s
1 Kista Science Tower
3 Scandic Victoria Tower
5 Kista Torn

== Tallest buildings ==
This list ranks completed buildings in Stockholm that stand at least 75 m (246 ft) tall as of 2026, based on standard height measurement. This includes spires and architectural details but does not include antenna masts. The “Year” column indicates the year of completion. Buildings tied in height are sorted by year of completion with earlier buildings ranked first, and then alphabetically.

Was the tallest building in Stockholm upon completion

| Rank | Name | Image | Location | Height m (ft) | Floors | Year | Purpose | Notes |
|---|---|---|---|---|---|---|---|---|
| 1 | Kista Science Tower | | 59°24′05″N 17°56′48″E | 124 (407) | 32 | 2003 | Office | Tallest building in Stockholm since 2003. Third tallest building in Sweden. Tallest building in Sweden from 2003 to 2005, before being surpassed by Turning Torso in Malmö. Tallest building completed in Stockholm in the 2000s. If its rooftop antenna is included, the building reaches 156 m (512 ft) in height. |
| 2 | Innovationen | | 59°20′46″N 18°02′03″E | 120.5 (395) | 38 | 2020 | Residential | Part of the Norra Tornen development, noted for its alternating bay windows and recessed terraces. Tallest residential building in Stockholm. Tallest building completed in Stockholm in the 2020s. |
| 3 | Scandic Victoria Tower | | 59°24′25″N 17°57′27″E | 117.6 (386) | 35 | 2011 | Mixed-use | Also known simply as Victoria Tower. Mixed-use hotel and office building. Tallest building completed in Stockholm in the 2010s. Tallest mixed-use building in Stockholm. It is named after Crown Princess Victoria, the heir apparent to the Swedish throne. |
| 4 | Helix | | 59°20′44″N 18°01′59″E | 114 (374) | 35 | 2020 | Residential | Part of the Norra Tornen development, noted for its alternating bay windows and recessed terraces. |
| 5 | Kista Torn | | 59°24′18″N 17°56′31″E | 111.7 (366) | 40 | 2015 | Residential | Also known as K1. Tallest residential building in Stockholm from 2015 to 2020. |
| 6 | Sthlm 01 | | 59°18′04″N 18°05′00″E | 102.5 (336) | 27 | 2020 | Office | Also known as Stockholm One. |
| 7 | Kajen 6 | | 59°18′22″N 18°02′07″E | 87.6 (287) | 27 | 2021 | Residential | Also known as Kajplats 6. |
| 8 | Skatteskrapan | | 59°18′43″N 18°04′25″E | 86 (282) | 27 | 1959 | Mixed-use | Tallest building completed in Stockholm in the 1950s. Originally completed in 1959 at a height of 81 m (266 ft) and 25 storeys, it was the building in Stockholm and Sweden from 1959 to 1964. It housed the Swedish National Tax Board until 2003, and was later converted to student housing, with two floors added. The building is now primarily residential with office space on the top floors. |
| 9 | Söder Torn | | 59°18′54″N 18°04′11″E | 86 (282) | 24 | 1997 | Residential | Tallest building completed in Stockholm in the 1990s. Tallest building in Stockholm from 1997 to 2003. Features a octagonal floor plan and a distinct crown. The building was originally designed by Danish architect Henning Larsen to have 40 floors. The name is Swedish for "South Tower". |
| 10 | Dagens Nyheter Tower | | 59°19′41″N 18°00′58″E | 84 (276) | 26 | 1964 | Office | Tallest building completed in Stockholm in the 1960s. Tallest building in Stockholm from 1964 to 1997. Also known as DN-skrapan in Swedish. The building was originally home to Dagens Nyheter, the largest daily newspaper in Sweden. The newspaper moved out in the 1990s. |
| 11 | Kajen 7 | | 59°18′21″N 18°02′10″E | 80 (262) | 24 | 2022 | Residential | |
| 12 | Folksamhuset | | 59°18′22″N 18°04′47″E | 79 (259) | 24 | 1959 | Office | Headquarters of insurance company Folksam. |
| 13 | Kajen 5 | | 59°18′23″N 18°02′03″E | 76.2 (250) | 25 | 2016 | Residential | |
| 14 | Wenner-Gren Center | | 59°21′04″N 18°02′55″E | 76 (249) | 25 | 1961 | Office | The building is also known as Pylon. The center consists of three buildings, the other two being Helicon and Tetragon. The center is named after businessman Axel Wenner-Gren, who donated funds to finance its construction, after Nobel Prize winner Hugo Theorell had lobbied for more accommodation for visiting scientists. |
| 15 | Beundra | | 59°18′06″N 18°01′41″E | 75 (246) | 24 | 2023 | Residential | |

== Tallest under construction or proposed ==
=== Under construction ===
As of 2026, there are no buildings planned to be taller than 75 m (246 ft) that are under construction in Stockholm. The most recent building constructed taller than that height is Beundra, which was completed in 2023.

=== Proposed ===
The following table includes approved and proposed buildings in Stockholm that are planned to be at least 75 m (246 ft) tall as of 2026, based on standard height measurement. The “Year” column indicates the expected year of completion. Buildings that are on hold are not included.

| Name | Height m (ft) | Floors | Year | Purpose | Notes |
|---|---|---|---|---|---|
| Playce I | 142 (466) | 41 | 2031 | Residential | |
| Playce II | 82 (269) | 27 | 2031 | Residential | |

== Timeline of tallest buildings ==
This lists buildings that once held the title of the tallest building in Stockholm.

| Name | Image | Years as tallest | Height m (ft) | Floors | References |
|---|---|---|---|---|---|
| Norra Kungstornet | | 1924–1925 | 60 (197) | 16 | |
| Södra Kungstornet | | 1925–1959 | 61 (200) | 17 | |
| Skatteskrapan | | 1959–1964 | 81 (266) | 25 | |
| Dagens Nyheter Tower | | 1964–1997 | 84 (276) | 26 | |
| Soder Torn | | 1997–2003 | 86 (282) | 24 | |
| Kista Science Tower | | 2003–present | 124 (407) | 32 | |

== See also ==
- List of tallest buildings in Sweden
