= List of tallest buildings in Sweden =

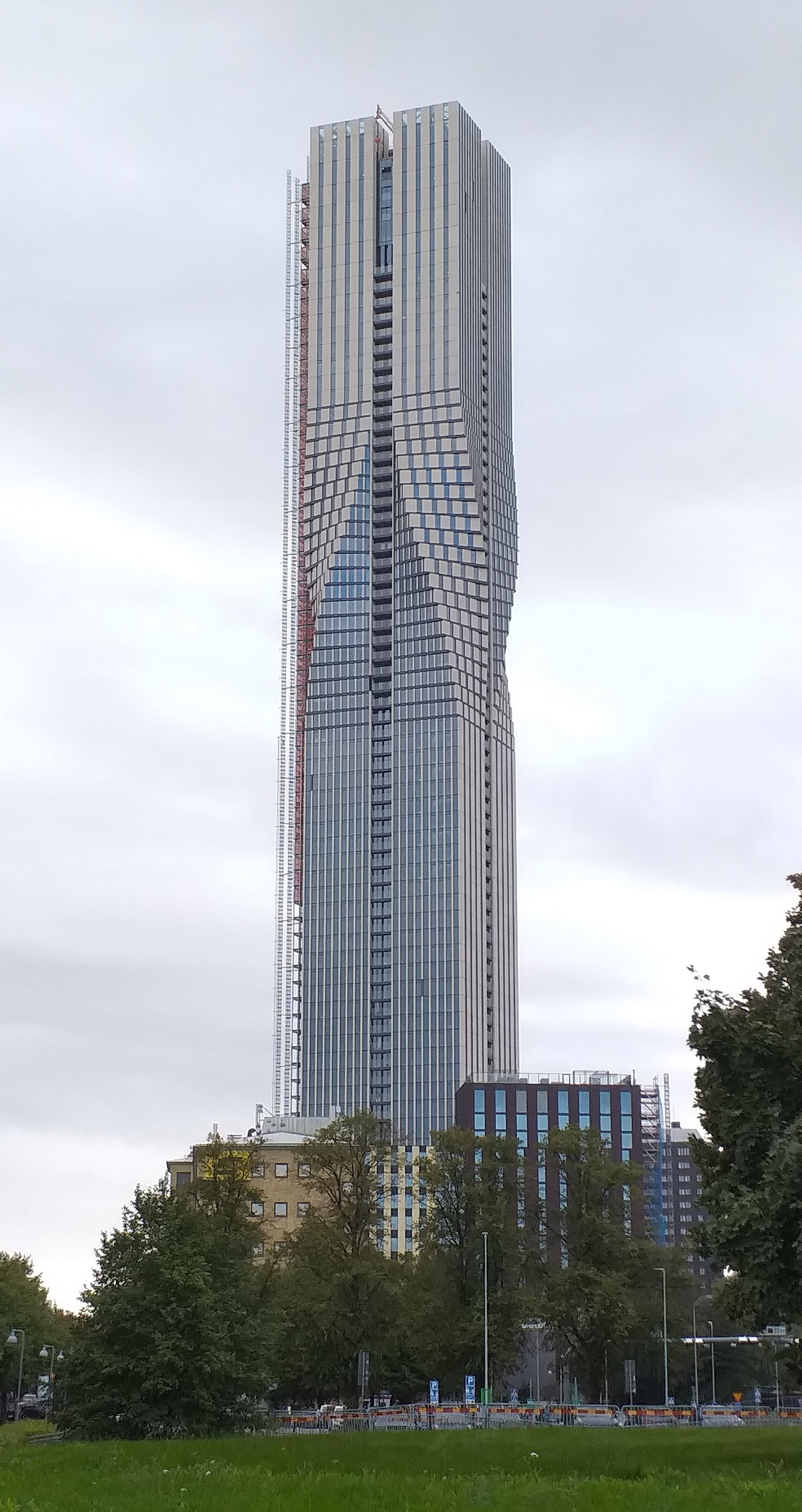
Karlatornet, 246 m is the tallest building in the Nordics.

This is a list of the tallest buildings in Sweden. The history of skyscrapers in Sweden began with the completion of Kungstornen on Kungsgatan in Stockholm. The twin towers are each 60 m (197 ft) high and were completed in 1924 and 1925 respectively. In 1927 Thor Thörnblad proposed an American inspired skyscraper on Blasieholmen in Stockholm, the proposal was 40 floors and 150 metres high. This would have made it the tallest skyscraper in Europe by a large margin at the time. In the Post-World War II era construction of several high-rise buildings began, such as Wenner-Gren Center, Skatteskrapan, Hötorgsskraporna, Folksamhuset, and Kronprinsen. In the early part for the 21st century a new wave of high-rise buildings has reached Sweden. Karlatornet in Gothenburg stands as the tallest building in Sweden and Scandinavia.

Many Swedish skyscraper projects have been cancelled after protests, or because the plans were proved economically unsustainable. A 200 m (656 ft) high skyscraper, called Tell Us Tower, was planned for construction in 2010 at Telefonplan in Stockholm's southern suburbs, but the plans were cancelled in 2007. There were plans to construct a 325 m (1,066 ft) high skyscraper, Scandinavian Tower, in Malmö, but they were canceled in 2004. If built, the Scandinavian Tower would have been the tallest skyscraper in Europe.

== List ==
Definition

1. Height to architectural top: This is the main criterion under which the CTBUH ranks the height of buildings. Heights are measured from the level of the lowest, significant, open-air, pedestrian entrance to the top of the building, inclusive of spires but excluding items such as flagpoles and antennae.
2. Highest occupied floor: Height to the floor level of the highest floor that is occupied by residents, workers or other building users on a consistent basis.
3. Height to tip: Height to the highest point of the building, including antennae, flagpoles, and technical equipment.

Building heights are measured in "plushöjd" with the RH2000 vertical reference system in Sweden, which shares its zero point with the NAP. The zero point is approximately at sea level. A common mistake is therefore to cite the "plushöjd" as the building's height, which in fact is the height above sea level.

If a source states no specific type of height it is displayed in the "Height to architectural top" category, which is also the official height. Unknowns are represented by a 0.

== Tallest buildings ==
Was the tallest building in Sweden upon completion

Name	Picture	Location	Height to architectural top	Height to tip	Floors	Year	Source	Notes
Karlatornet		Gothenburg	246 m (807 ft)	246 m (807 ft)	74	2024		Tallest building in the Nordic Countries
Turning Torso		Malmö	190.0 m (623 ft)	190.0 m (623 ft)	54	2005		Won the Emporis Skyscraper Award in 2005. Previous tallest building in Scandinavia.
Citygate		Gothenburg	144 m (472 ft)	144 m (472 ft)	36	2022		Tallest office building in Scandinavia
Norra Tornen 1		Stockholm	125 m (410 ft)	125 m (410 ft)	36	2018		Tallest building in Stockholm.
Kista Science Tower		Stockholm	124.00 m (407 ft)	156 m (512 ft)	30	2003	(Note: The data has been retrieved from structural drawings in the Stockholms Stads Stadsbyggnadskontors archive. It is therefore more accurate than most sources found online.) (Note: The height of the antenna is an estimate.)	
Kista Torn		Stockholm	117.88 m (387 ft)	119.39 m (392 ft)	40	2016		
Scandic Victoria Tower		Stockholm	117.45 m (385 ft)	119.95 m (394 ft)	35	2011		Tallest hotel in Sweden.
Kineum		Gothenburg	110 m (361 ft)	110 m (361 ft)	27	2022		
Point Hyllie		Malmö	110.00 m (361 ft)	110.00 m (361 ft)	29	2019		
Norra tornen 2		Stockholm	110 m (361 ft)	110 m (361 ft)	30	2020		
Hotel Draken		Gothenburg	104 m (341 ft)	104 m (341 ft)	33	2023		
Sthlm 01		Stockholm	102 m (335 ft)	102 m (335 ft)	27	2020		
Gårda Vesta		Gothenburg	97 m (318 ft)	97 m (318 ft)	25	2021		
Gothia Towers: East Tower		Gothenburg	92.35 m (303 ft)	92.35 m (303 ft)	29	2014		
Kajplats 6		Stockholm	87.6 m (287 ft)	87.6 m (287 ft)	26	2020		
Malmö Live		Malmö	87 m (285 ft)	87 m (285 ft)	25	2015		
Söder Torn		Stockholm	86.20 m (283 ft)	86.20 m (283 ft)	25	1997		Has a spire, the roof height is 75.20m.
Skatteskrapan		Stockholm	85.50 m (281 ft)	0 m (0 ft)	28	1959		2 floors added in 2007.
DN-skrapan		Stockholm	82.38 m (270 ft)	88.0 m (289 ft)	26	1964		The chimney is 85.27m.
Kronprinsen		Malmö	82 m (269 ft)	87 m (285 ft)	27	1964		
Tyresö View		Stockholm / Tyresö	82 m (269 ft)	82 m (269 ft)	23	2014		
Quality Hotel Friends		Stockholm / Solna	81.5 m (267 ft)	81.5 m (267 ft)	25	2013		
Skrapan		Västerås	81.4 m (267 ft)	0 m (0 ft)	26	1990		
Lilla Bommen		Gothenburg	81.3 m (267 ft)	0 m (0 ft)	23	1989		
Kronjuvelen		Gothenburg	80 m (262 ft)	80 m (262 ft)	27	2023		
Gothia Towers: Crown Tower		Gothenburg	79.45 m (261 ft)	79.45 m (261 ft)	25	1988		6 floors added in 2013.
Folksamhuset		Stockholm	79.29 m (260 ft)	85.04 m (279 ft)	26	1959		
Gamlestads Torg Hus A		Gothenburg	79.6 m (261 ft)	0 m (0 ft)	17	2018		
Lusten		Stockholm	77 m (253 ft)	78 m (256 ft)	24	2014		
Kajen 5		Stockholm	76.15 m (250 ft)	76.15 m (250 ft)	25	2011		
Wenner-Gren Center		Stockholm	75.70 m (248 ft)	0 m (0 ft)	26	1961		
Kajen 4		Stockholm	74.60 m (245 ft)	74.60 m (245 ft)	25	2016		
Gothia Towers: West Tower		Gothenburg	74.35 m (244 ft)	74.35 m (244 ft)	24	2001		
Sara Kulturhus		Skellefteå	74 m (243 ft)		20	2021		
Ideon Gateway		Lund	74 m (243 ft)	0 m (0 ft)	19	2012		
Trade Center		Halmstad	73.5 m (241 ft)	0 m (0 ft)	23	1988		
Platinan		Gothenburg	72 m (236 ft)	0 m (0 ft)	18	2022		
Nejlikan		Borås	70.1 m (230 ft)	0 m (0 ft)	21	2014		
Infra City		Stockholm / Upplands Väsby	70 m (230 ft)	0 m (0 ft)	24	1991		
Scandic Triangeln		Malmö	69 m (226 ft)	69 m (226 ft)	22	1989		
Kv. Kaninen		Malmö	68 m (223 ft)	0 m (0 ft)	22	2014		
Malmö tingsrätt		Malmö	68 m (223 ft)	68 m (223 ft)		2022		
Närlundaskrapan		Helsingborg	68 m (223 ft)	69.3 m (227 ft)	19	2007		
Brf ICON		Växjö	67 m (220 ft)	67 m (220 ft)	20	2018		
Quality Hotel View		Malmö	65 m (213 ft)	67 m (220 ft)	19	2015		
Gängtappen		Malmö	65 m (213 ft)	0 m (0 ft)	15	1958		
Rica Talk Hotel		Stockholm	65 m (213 ft)	0 m (0 ft)	17	2006		
Tornet		Linköping	64 m (210 ft)	0 m (0 ft)	19	2009		
Slagthuset		Malmö	63 m (207 ft)	63 m (207 ft)	13	1993		
Bonnierhuset		Stockholm	62.20 m (204 ft)	62.20 m (204 ft)	18	1949		
Malmö Arena Hotell		Malmö	62 m (203 ft)	0 m (0 ft)	16	2014		
Hötorgsskrapan 1–5		Stockholm	61 m (200 ft)	0 m (0 ft)	19	1962		
Södra Kungstornet		Stockholm	61 m (200 ft)	0 m (0 ft)	17	1925		
Kungsholmsporten		Stockholm	60.80 m (199 ft)	0 m (0 ft)	20	2011		
Nyponet		Stockholm	60.04 m (197 ft)	0 m (0 ft)	21	1958		
Behrn Center		Örebro	60 m (197 ft)	0 m (0 ft)	16	2009		
Norra Kungstornet		Stockholm	60 m (197 ft)	0 m (0 ft)	16	1924		
Gröna Skrapan		Gothenburg	60 m (197 ft)	0 m (0 ft)	17	2010		
Gårda Business Center		Gothenburg	59.4 m (195 ft)	0 m (0 ft)	17	1989		
Forum Nacka		Stockholm / Nacka	59 m (194 ft)	74 m (243 ft)	18	1989		
Scandic Hotel Ariadne		Stockholm	58.55 m (192 ft)	0 m (0 ft)	17	1989		
Malmö Living		Malmö	58 m (190 ft)	58 m (190 ft)	20	2019		
Stockholm Globe City		Stockholm	58 m (190 ft)	0 m (0 ft)	16	1988		
Centralsjukhuset		Kristianstad	57 m (187 ft)	0 m (0 ft)	13	1973		
Studio		Malmö	56 m (184 ft)	0 m (0 ft)	13	2015		
Sahlgrenska Universitetssjukhuset		Gothenburg	56 m (184 ft)	0 m (0 ft)	18	1959		
Ostkupan		Gothenburg	56 m (184 ft)	0 m (0 ft)	16	1964		
Hus 1		Malmö	55 m (180 ft)	0 m (0 ft)	15	1965		
Niagara		Malmö	55 m (180 ft)	56 m (184 ft)	11	2015		
Arenatoppen		Lund	55 m (180 ft)	55 m (180 ft)	16	2016		
Frölunda Specialist Hospital		Gothenburg	55 m (180 ft)	0 m (0 ft)	17	1967		
ÅF-huset		Gothenburg	55 m (180 ft)	0 m (0 ft)	16	2014		
Universitetssjukhuset		Lund	53 m (174 ft)	55 m (180 ft)	14	1968		
Tenoren		Malmö	52 m (171 ft)	0 m (0 ft)	19	2016		
Öresundshuset		Malmö	52 m (171 ft)	0 m (0 ft)	14	1973		
Hotel Opalen		Gothenburg	51.5 m (169 ft)	0 m (0 ft)	16	2009		
Bryggudden		Karlstad	51 m (167 ft)	0 m (0 ft)	20	2013		
Mobilia Hus E1		Malmö	51 m (167 ft)	0 m (0 ft)	16	2014		
Uppsala View		Uppsala	51 m (167 ft)	0 m (0 ft)	16	2018		
Studentskrapan		Skövde	50 m (164 ft)	0 m (0 ft)	18	2006		
Krämaren		Örebro	50 m (164 ft)	0 m (0 ft)	16	1963		

== Under construction ==
Name	Location	Height	Floors	Year
Auriga	Gothenburg	125 m (410 ft)	36	2026
Virgo	Gothenburg	90 m (295 ft)	27	2026
Brf Celsius	Gothenburg	80 m (262 ft)	23	2026
Kaj 16	Gothenburg	78 m (256 ft)	16	2026

== Approved ==
This list also includes buildings under construction during the site clearing phase.

Name	Location	Height	Floors
Levnadskonstnären 1	Malmö	84 m (276 ft)	
Fyrtornet	Malmö	71.1 m (233 ft)	16
Levnadskonstnären 2	Malmö	67.2 m (220 ft)	
Droppen	Malmö	62.9 m (206 ft)	
Fabriken	Malmö	56.3 m (185 ft)	
Drivbänken	Malmö	50 m (164 ft)	

== Proposed ==
Name	Location	Height	Floors
Cassiopeja	Gothenburg	147 m (482 ft)	43
Gasklockan	Stockholm	140 m (459 ft)	45
+One	Gothenburg	140 m (459 ft)	40
Gasklockan	Stockholm	95.1 m (312 ft)	29
Packrummet 1	Stockholm	74 m (243 ft)	24
Packrummet 2	Stockholm	72 m (236 ft)	24
Jubileumstornet	Gothenburg		21
Älvtornet	Gothenburg		19

== See also ==
- List of tallest structures in Sweden
- List of tallest buildings in Scandinavia
- Karla Tower
- List of tallest buildings in Europe
