= Kista (disambiguation) =

Kista may refer to:

- Kista, a district in Stockholm, Sweden
- Kista borough, a borough in Stockholm, Sweden
- Kista metro station in Stockholm, Sweden
- Kista Galleria, a shopping mall in Stockholm, Sweden
- Kista Science Tower, a skyscraper in Stockholm, Sweden
- Kista Torn, a pair of apartment buildings in Stockholm, Sweden
- Kista Nunatak in Antarctica
- Kista Rock, an island off the Antarctic coast
- Kista Strait, a strait in Mac. Robertson Land, Antarctica
