= Skrapan =

Skrapan (Swedish word for "The Scraper") may refer to:

- Skatteskrapan ("The Tax Scraper") in Stockholm.
- Skrapan ("The Scraper"), a building in Västerås.
- Studentskrapan, a dwelling skyscraper that includes student apartments ("studentlägenheter"), located in Skövde.
