= Folksamhuset =

High-rise building in Stockholm, Sweden

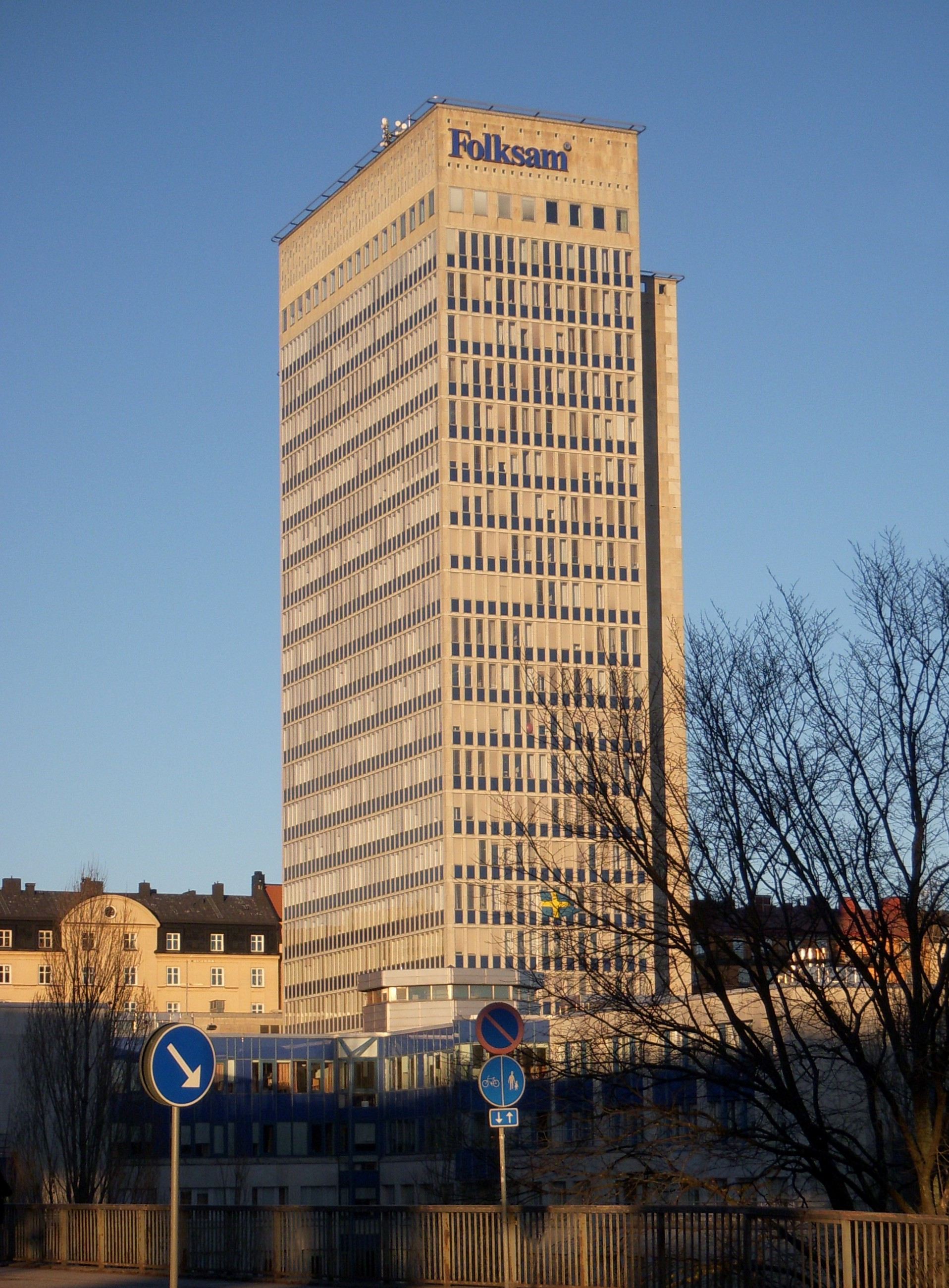
- Western façade, 2008
- Interactive map of the Folksamhuset area

General information
- Type: Office building
- Location: Skanstull Stockholm, Sweden
- Coordinates: 59°18′22″N 18°04′47″E
- Construction started: 1958
- Completed: 1959
- Owner: Folksam

Height
- Roof: 79 m (259 ft)

Technical details
- Floor count: 23

Design and construction
- Architect: Nils Einar Eriksson

Folksamhuset (Swedish for "Folksam Building") is a high-rise office building at Skanstull on Södermalm, Stockholm and was erected in 1959 as the head office for the insurance company Folksam. Designed by Nils Einar Eriksson, Folksamhuset is 79 metres (259 ft) and 23 stories tall.

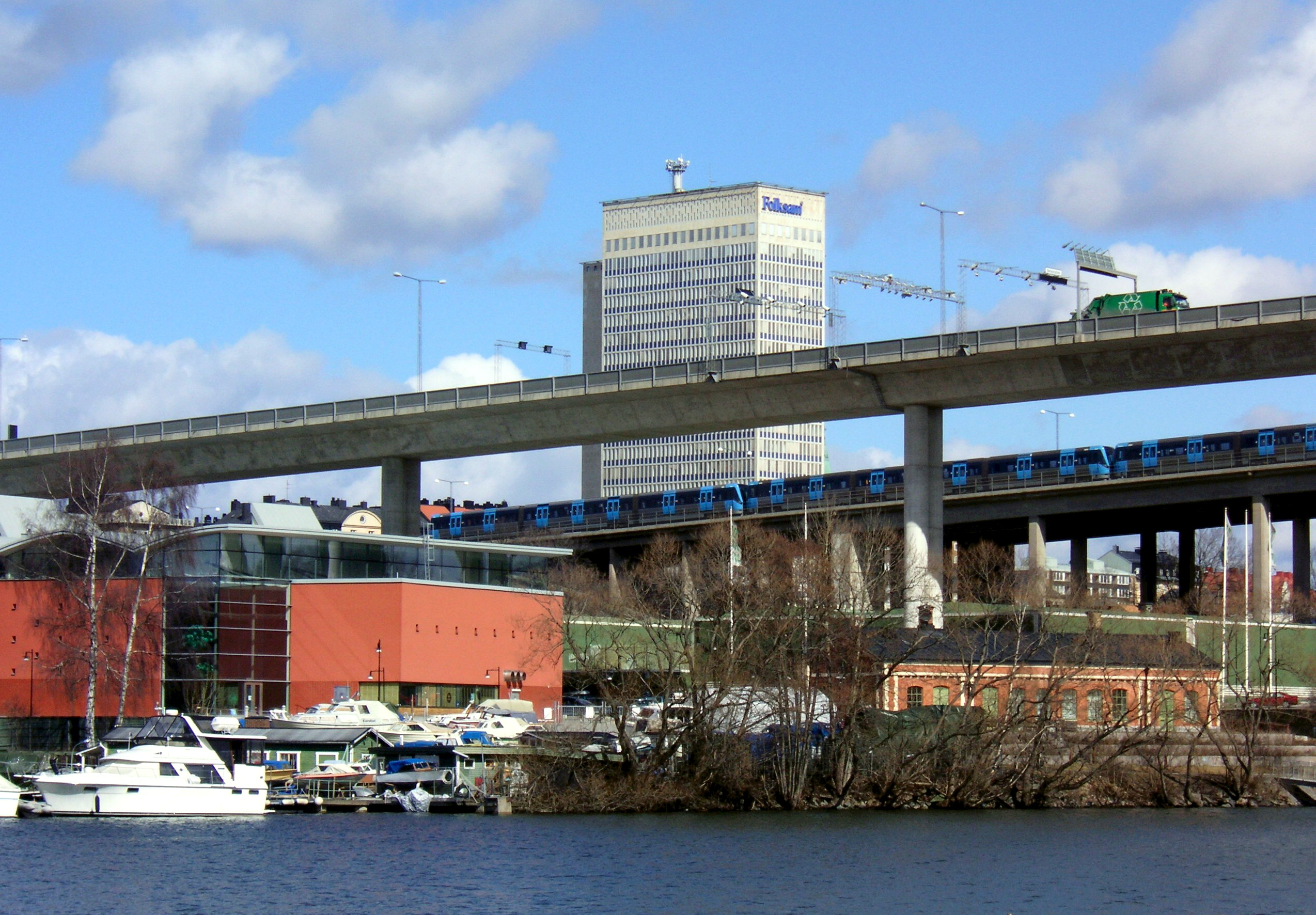
Folksamhuset and the bridges passing in front of it.

The building, located on the southern toll of the historical city centre, was created as a vertical accent intended to counterbalance the large scale traffic routes and bridges passing in front of it: Skansbron, Skanstullsbron, and Johanneshovsbron. As one of the components in this urban superstructure, it also serves as a landmark underlining the main southern approach to Stockholm, together with other large-scale structures such as the Globe Arena, Skatteskrapan, and Söder Torn.

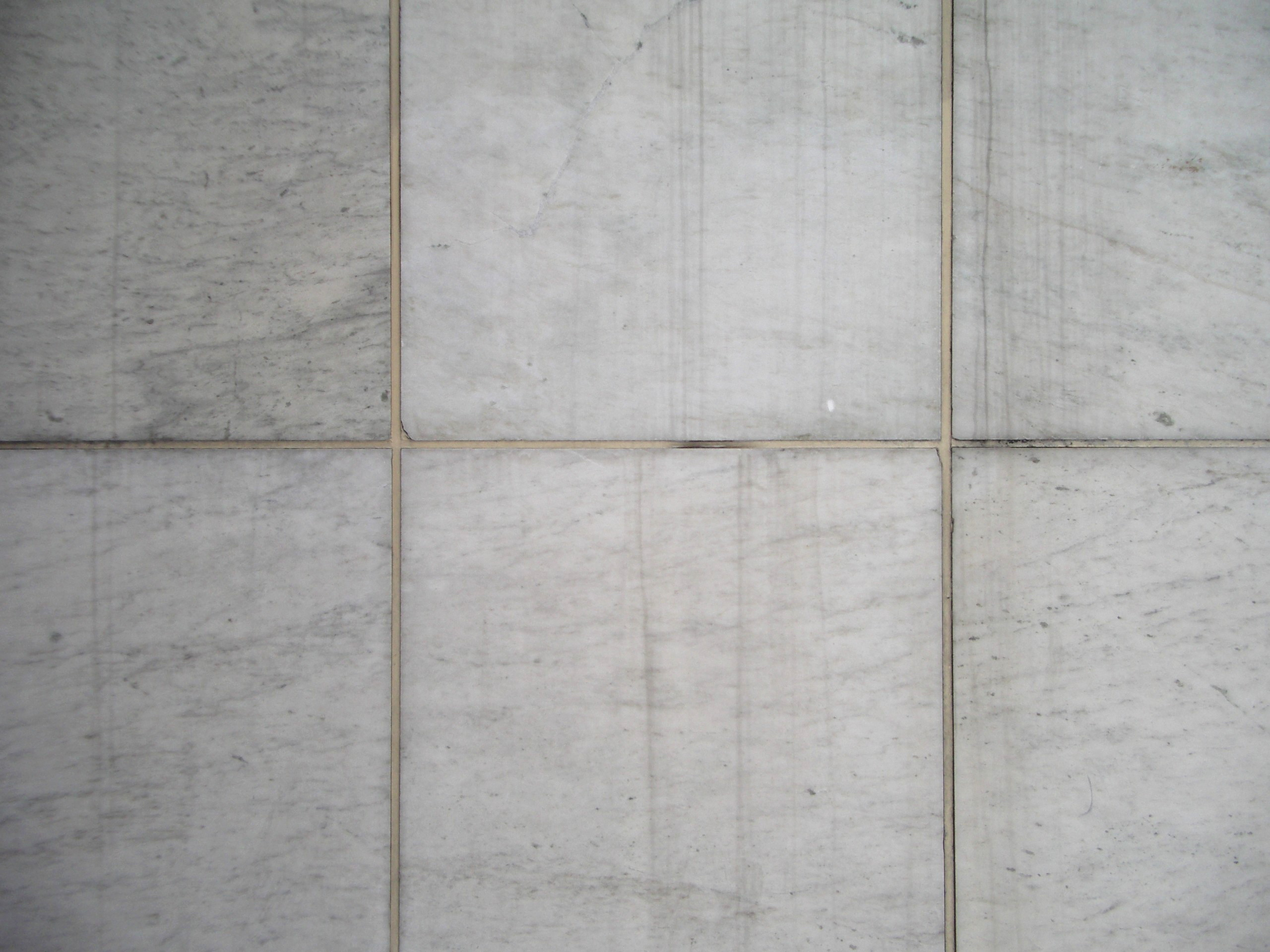
Ekeberg marble tiles.

The façades of the building are dressed up in blasted slabs of light grey marble, referred to as Ekebergsmarmor in Sweden. At the base of the building is a terrace with green areas. The interior office-spaces, the design of Yngve Tegnér, were inspired by large-scale industrial production.

== See also ==
- List of tallest buildings in Sweden
