= Vasakronan =

Swedish

Vasakronan AB
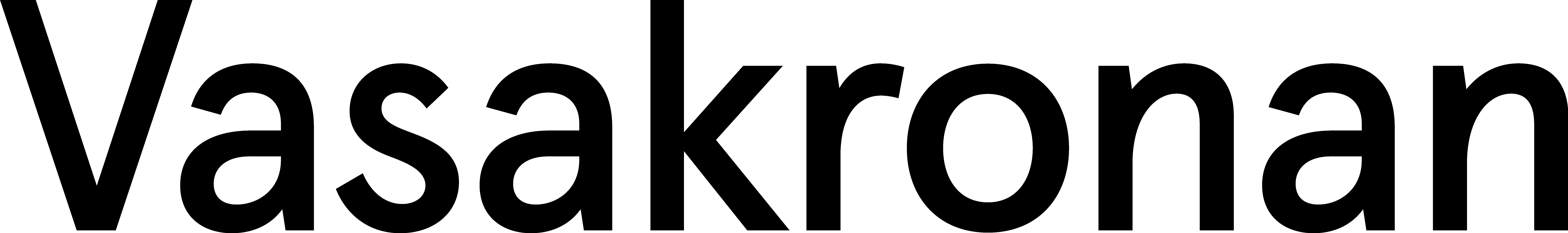
- Formerly: AP Fastigheter AB (1998 - 2008), Vasakronan AB (1993 - 2008)
- Type: Aktiebolag
- Industry: Property
- Headquarters: Stockholm, Sweden
- Key people: Johanna Skogestig, CEO
- AUM: SEK 5274 million (2020)
- Owner: First, Second, Third and Fourth Swedish national pension funds
- Website: vasakronan.se/en

Vasakronan is a Swedish real estate company. Formerly wholly government-owned, it is now owned in equal shares by the First, Second, Third and Fourth Swedish national pension funds.

Vasakronan is one of the largest real estate companies in Sweden, and has operations in Stockholm, the Stockholm suburbs, Gothenburg, Malmö and Uppsala.

In 2008, Vasakronan merged with AP Fastigheter. The company operates under the Vasakronan name today.

== Properties ==
- Kista Science Tower
- Lilla Bommen
- Hötorgshus 1,2,3 and 4
