= Kista Science Tower =

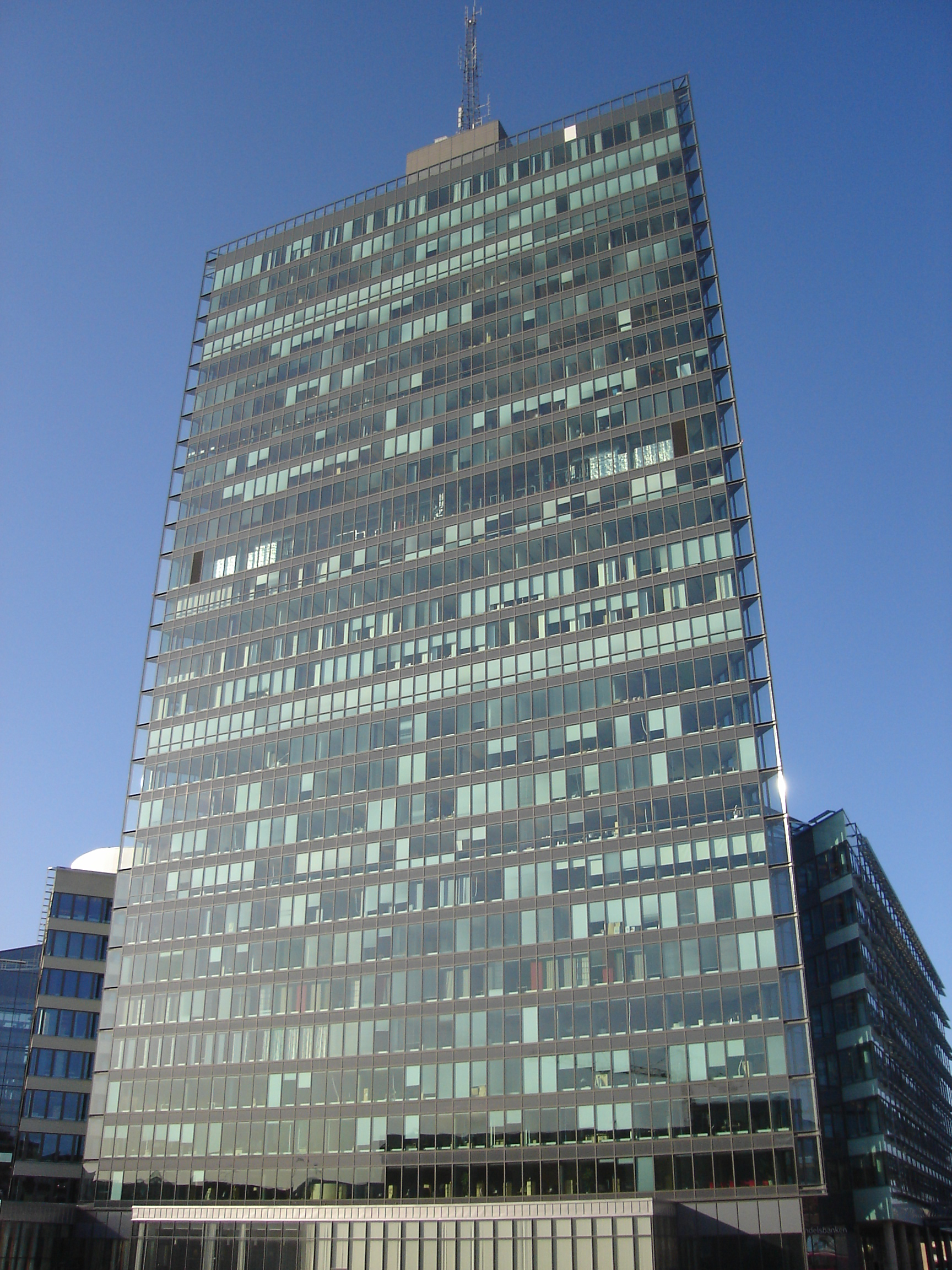
- Interactive map of the Kista Science Tower area

General information
- Status: Completed
- Type: Commercial offices
- Architectural style: Modernism
- Location: Färögatan 33; Stockholm, Sweden
- Coordinates: 59.402°N 17.947°E
- Construction started: 2000
- Completed: 2003

Height
- Antenna spire: 156 m (512 ft)
- Roof: 124 m (407 ft)

Technical details
- Floor count: 32
- Floor area: 50,000 m^{2} (540,000 sq ft)
- Lifts/elevators: 24

Design and construction
- Architect: White Arkitekter
- Main contractor: NCC Construction Sverige AB

Kista Science Tower is a 32-story, 124 m (407 ft) skyscraper in Kista, Stockholm, Sweden. With its roof-top antenna, its height is 156 m (512 ft), making it one of the tallest buildings in the country, just between Turning Torso and Scandic Victoria Tower. The black cube on top of the roof is, contrary to some rumors, not meant to be the start of more floors; it is the top of the elevator shaft and space for the electronics for the antenna. The tower was originally meant to have a few additional floors but they were canceled due to the early 2000s recession. However, the already built elevator shaft was not shortened and the distinctive concrete block at the top remains. The tower has 33 floors in total, three of which are below the main entrance level consisting mainly of parking spaces.

Kista Science Tower was completed in 2003. It was the tallest skyscraper in Sweden at the time but was soon surpassed by Turning Torso, built in Malmö in 2005. It is still the tallest office building in Scandinavia.

The building is home to the fastest elevators in Sweden. They reach speeds of 5 to 6 metres per second (16 to 20 ft/s).

The building houses several technology and IT companies. It is located next to Kista Galleria, a large shopping complex, and the Kista metro station.

== See also ==
- List of tallest buildings in Sweden
