= Kista Rock =

Small island in Antarctica

- Location within Antarctica

Geography
- Location: Antarctica
- Coordinates: 69°44′S 74°24′E

Administration
- Administered under the Antarctic Treaty System

Demographics
- Population: Uninhabited

Kista Rock is a small island, the southernmost of a chain of small islands, lying off the coast of Antarctica 2 kilometres (1 nmi) north of Mount Caroline Mikkelsen. It was first plotted from air photos taken by the Lars Christensen Expedition, 1936–37. An Australian National Antarctic Research Expeditions (ANARE) party landed by aircraft on Kista Rock in 1957 and obtained an astrofix. It was named after the Kista Dan which was used by ANARE as an expedition ship, 1954–57.
