= Gasklockan =

- Artist's rendering of Gasklockan
- Interactive map of the Gasklockan area

General information
- Status: Approved
- Type: Residential
- Location: Norra Djurgårdsstaden, Stockholm, Sweden
- Coordinates: 59.355677°N 18.090218°E

Height
- Height: 140 metres (460 ft)

Technical details
- Floor count: 45

Design and construction
- Architecture firm: Herzog & de Meuron
- Developer: Oscar Properties

Website
- oscarproperties.com

Gasklockan is a planned skyscraper, located in Norra Djurgårdsstaden district of Stockholm, Sweden. Originally scheduled to open in 2018–2019, the tower has been delayed indefinitely and its original height of 140 m (460 ft) has been revised to 110 m (360 ft) and 28 floors. The complex is designed by the Swiss architecture firm Herzog & de Meuron, commissioned by the Swedish developer Oscar Properties, and would contain approximately 320 residential units. Ground breaking was planned first quarter 2016.

In November 2019 the City of Stockholm announced that the agreement with Oscar Properties had been cancelled due to arrears with payment of the purchase price of the ground.

== See also ==
- Architecture of Stockholm
