= Kista Torn =

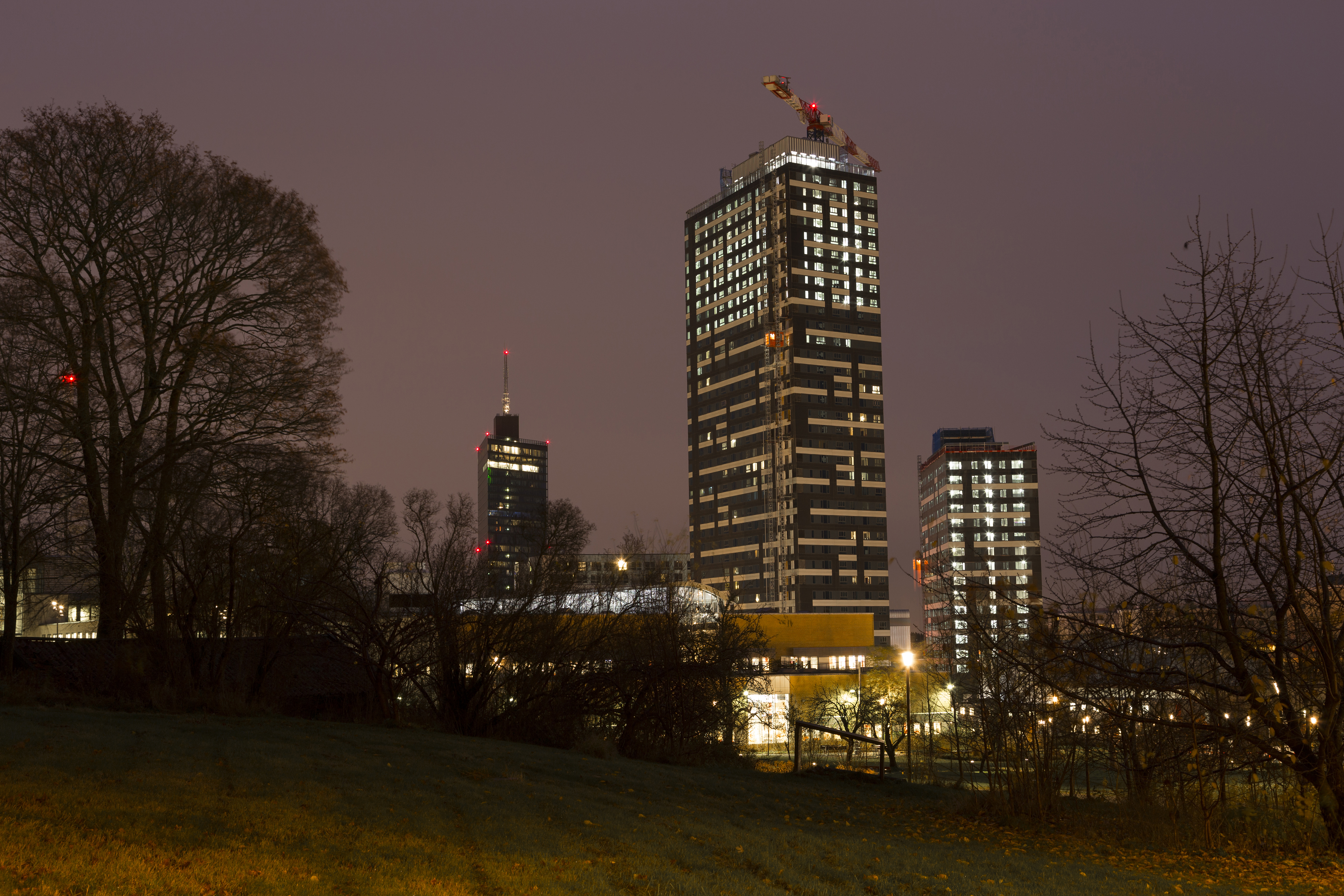
- Kista Torn, november 2015
- Interactive map of the Kista Torn area

General information
- Status: Completed
- Type: Residential
- Location: Kista, Stockholm, Sweden
- Coordinates: 59.4048°N 17.9418°E
- Completed: 2015

Height
- Architectural: 117.88 metres (386.7 ft)
- Tip: 119.39 metres (391.7 ft)
- Top floor: 109.68 metres (359.8 ft)

Technical details
- Floor count: 40

Design and construction
- Architecture firm: Brunnberg & Forshed
- Developer: JM AB

Website
- jm.se

Kista Torn (in English, Kista Towers) is a pair of 19- and 40-storey apartment buildings, connected at their base. The towers are situated on Borgarfjordsgatan in the Kista district of Stockholm, Sweden. The highest tower ("K1") stands at 117.9 m (387 ft) tall, which made it the tallest residential skyscraper in Stockholm on its completion in 2015. This feat is set to be matched by Norra Tornen in Hagastaden, upon completion of that project.

The complex was designed by Brunnberg & Forshed Arkitektkontor AB, and is situated 200 m (660 ft) from Kista Centrum bus station and Kista metro station, alongside Kista Galleria shopping mall.
