= Folksam =

Swedish insurance company

Logo

Folksam is one of the largest insurance companies in Sweden. The company headquarters are located in Stockholm. Folksam consists of the two mutual insurance companies Folksam sak and Folksam liv. Folksam is today a Swedish insurance company only, after the sale in 2001 of the English subsidiary Folksam International.

Folksam is closely connected to the cooperative and trade union organizations in Sweden and it was started in 1908 as an insurance branch of Kooperativa Förbundet, KF, the main cooperative retail organisation. The original company (Samarbete, Swedish for cooperation) was a mutual fire insurance company. In 1914, the second branch, a mutual life insurance company, was opened under the name of Folket (the people). The two names were used together in marketing and in 1946 they were contracted into one name: Folksam.
