= Studentskrapan =

Building in Skövde, Sweden

Coordinates: 58°23′29″N 13°51′20″E

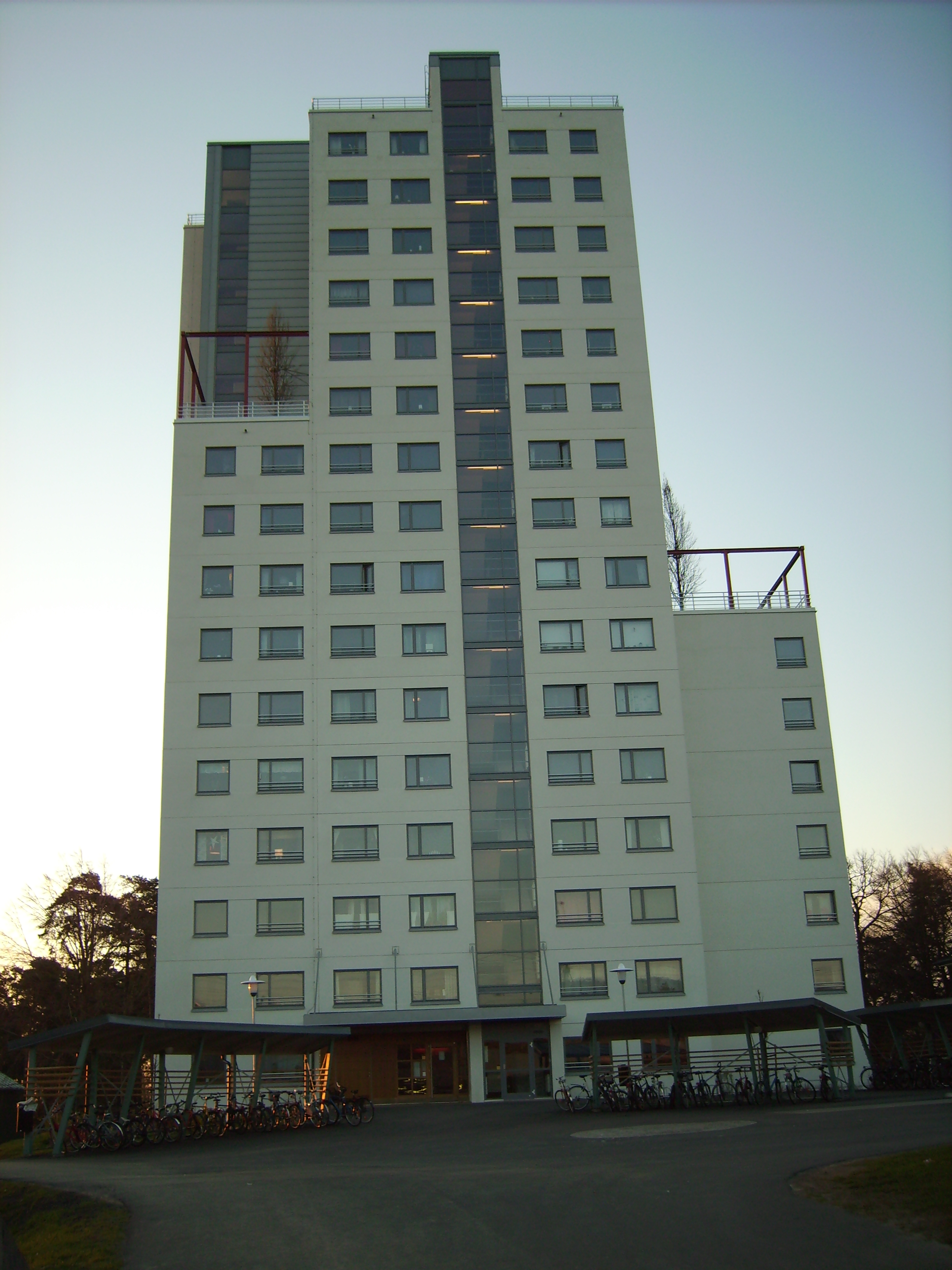
Studentskrapan on 15 April 2007

Studentskrapan ("The Student Scraper"), even called Skrapan, is a dwelling skyscraper located in the central of Skövde in Västra Götaland County, Sweden, about 200 m from the University of Skövde. It opened on 1 July 2006 and includes 18 floors and 113 student apartments ("studentlägenheter") and it is 50 m tall.

Studentskrapan is owned by Skövdebostäder and its entrepreneur is Skanska.

On 22 October 2006 a death accident occurred when a 15-year-old girl fell from a window.
