= Scandic Victoria Tower =

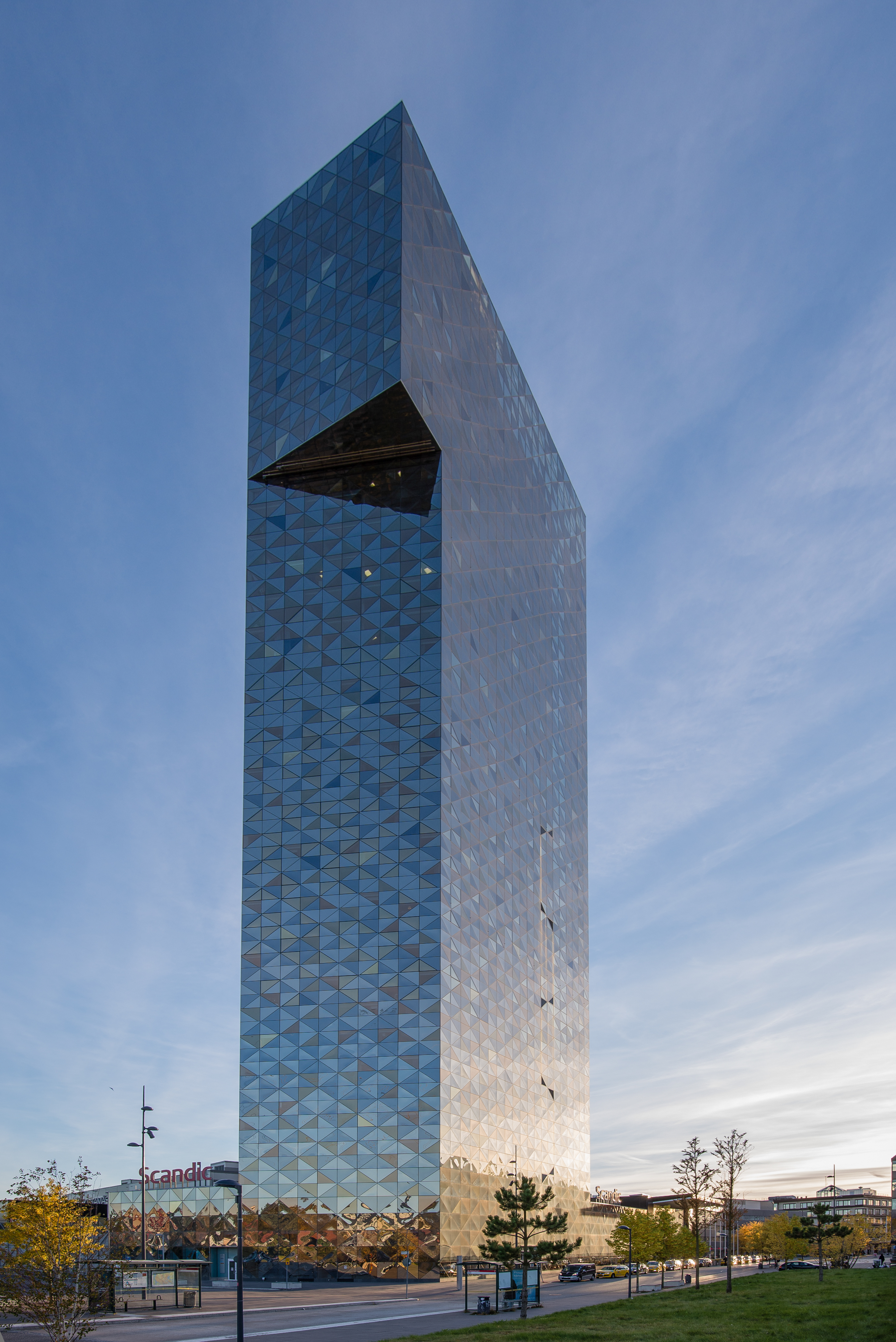
- Scandic Victoria Tower in Stockholm
- Interactive map of the Scandic Victoria Tower area

General information
- Status: Completed
- Type: Hotel
- Location: Kista, Stockholm, Sweden
- Coordinates: 59.407°N 17.9575°E
- Completed: 2011
- Cost: SEK 600 million / US$90 million
- Owner: Scandic Hotels

Height
- Roof: 117 m (384 ft)

Technical details
- Floor count: 34

Design and construction
- Architect: Gert Wingårdh
- Main contractor: Peab

Other information
- Number of rooms: 299

The Scandic Victoria Tower is a skyscraper hotel in the Kista district of Stockholm, Sweden. It is also known as the Victoria Tower, however the Scandic name is used to distinguish it from the Victoria Tower that forms the southwest end of the Palace of Westminster. The 117 metre hotel is one of the tallest buildings in Stockholm, as well as the tallest hotel in Scandinavia. It is named after Crown Princess Victoria, the heir apparent to the Swedish throne.

== See also ==
- List of tallest buildings in Stockholm
