= Wenner-Gren Center =

Building complex in Stockholm, Sweden

Coordinates: 59°21′04″N 18°02′55″E

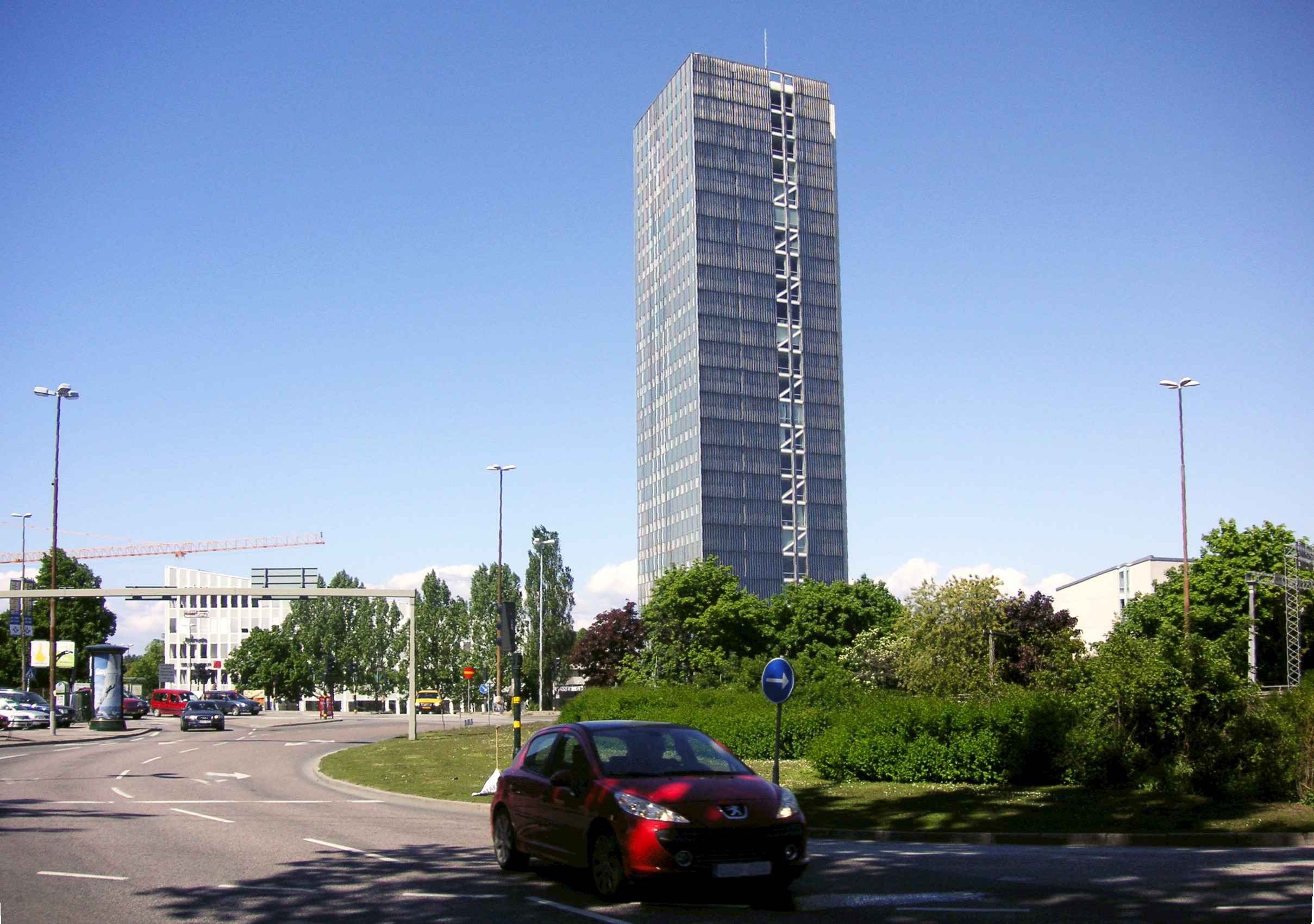
- Interactive map of the Wenner-Gren Center area

General information
- Location: Stockholm, Sweden
- Construction started: 1959
- Completed: 1961

Design and construction
- Architects: Sune Lindström; Alf Bydén

Wenner-Gren Center is a tower and building complex in Vasastan, Stockholm, Sweden. The building was constructed 1959–1961, and opened in 1962.

The Center consists of three buildings named Helicon, Pylon and Tetragon. Pylon is a high tower, Helicon is a lower semicircular part surrounding the tower, and Tetragon is a box-shaped building next to the tower. Helicon contains housing for visiting scientists to institutions in the Stockholm area, and this part is owned by one of the Wenner-Gren Foundations. The rest of the complex consists of commercial rental space, although some of it is traditionally used by scientific organisations, such as research-granting bodies.

The Center is named after the businessman Axel Wenner-Gren, who donated funds to finance its construction, after Nobel Prize winner Hugo Theorell had lobbied for having the housing need of visiting scientists addressed.
