= Norra Tornen =

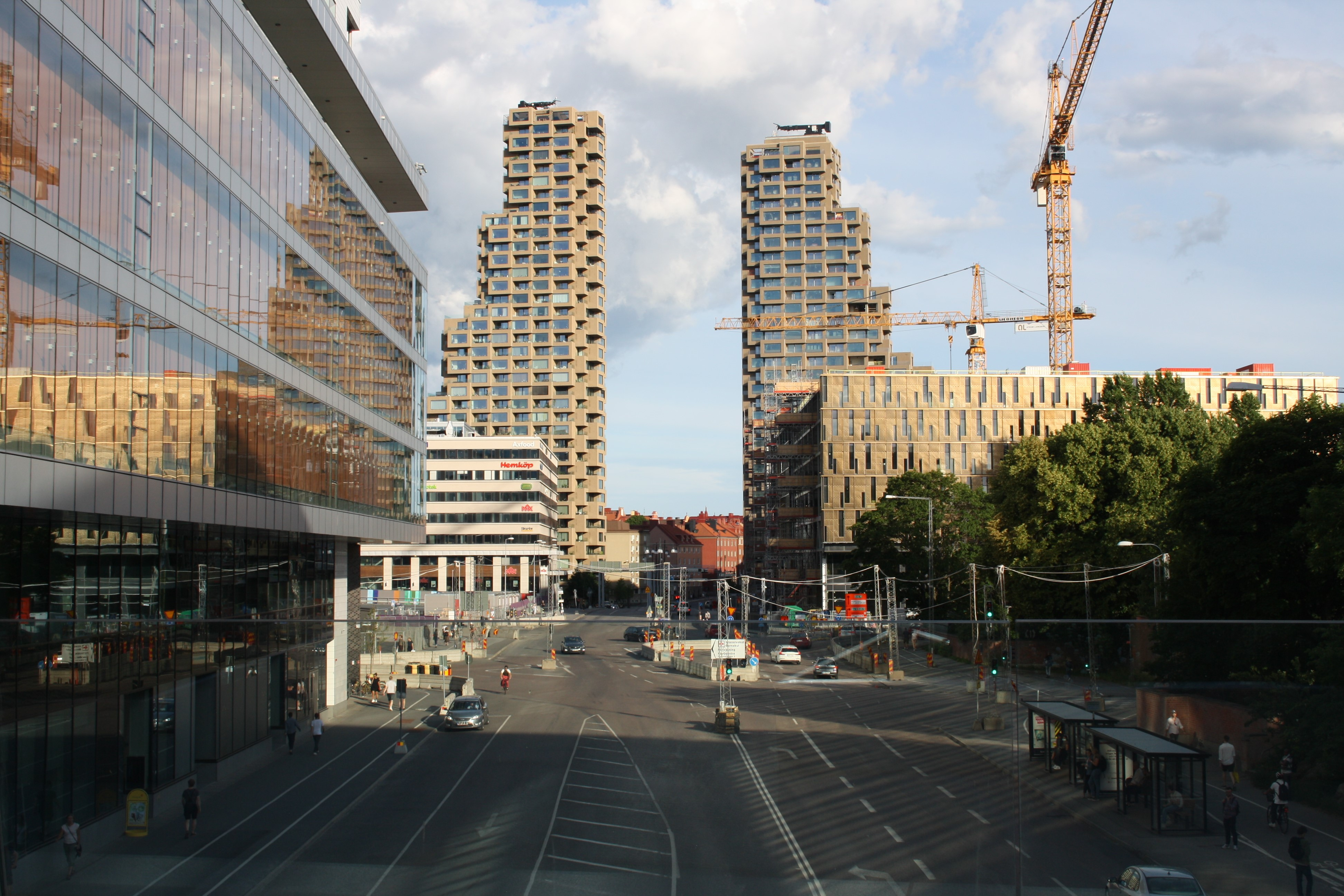
- Norra Tornen in June 2020
- Interactive map of the Norra Tornen area

General information
- Status: Completed
- Type: Residential
- Location: Vasastaden, Stockholm, Sweden
- Coordinates: 59°20′45.12″N 18°2′0.9″E

Height
- Height: East: 125 metres (410 ft); West: 110 metres (360 ft)

Technical details
- Material: Concrete
- Floor count: East: 35; West: 30

Design and construction
- Architect: Reinier de Graaf
- Architecture firm: OMA
- Developer: Oscar Properties
- Structural engineer: Arup

Website
- oscarproperties.com norratornen.se

Norra Tornen (in English, Northern Towers) are a pair of high-rise apartment buildings located in Vasastaden district of Stockholm, Sweden. Opened in 2018, the eastern tower is 125 m (410 ft) tall, consisting of 36 floors. The west tower opened in 2020 and is 110 m (360 ft) tall, with 33 floors. The complex contains 300 residential units and ground breaking took place in the autumn of 2015.

== History ==
In 2009, the Stockholm City planning office called for the construction of two skyscrapers in a new residential area on the border between Stockholm and Solna, a planning area later named Hagastaden. These 145 m (476 ft) twin towers were called "Tors Torn" in the original zoning plan, after the Torsplan plaza on which they were meant to be built. The general shape and approximate height were decided by City Architect Aleksander Wolodarski.

Despite being criticised for its height and for being similar to the Embarcadero Center in San Francisco, a Norwegian company was awarded the contract to build the skyscrapers – only to pull out in 2011, citing lack of funds. In 2012, the city invited several companies for a new informal competition for the development rights to the property. Mayor Sten Nordin finally presented the winning proposal in June 2013: A design by the Dutch architectural firm OMA, commissioned by Oscar Properties, scheduled for completion in 2018.

== Construction of the towers ==
Construction of the east tower

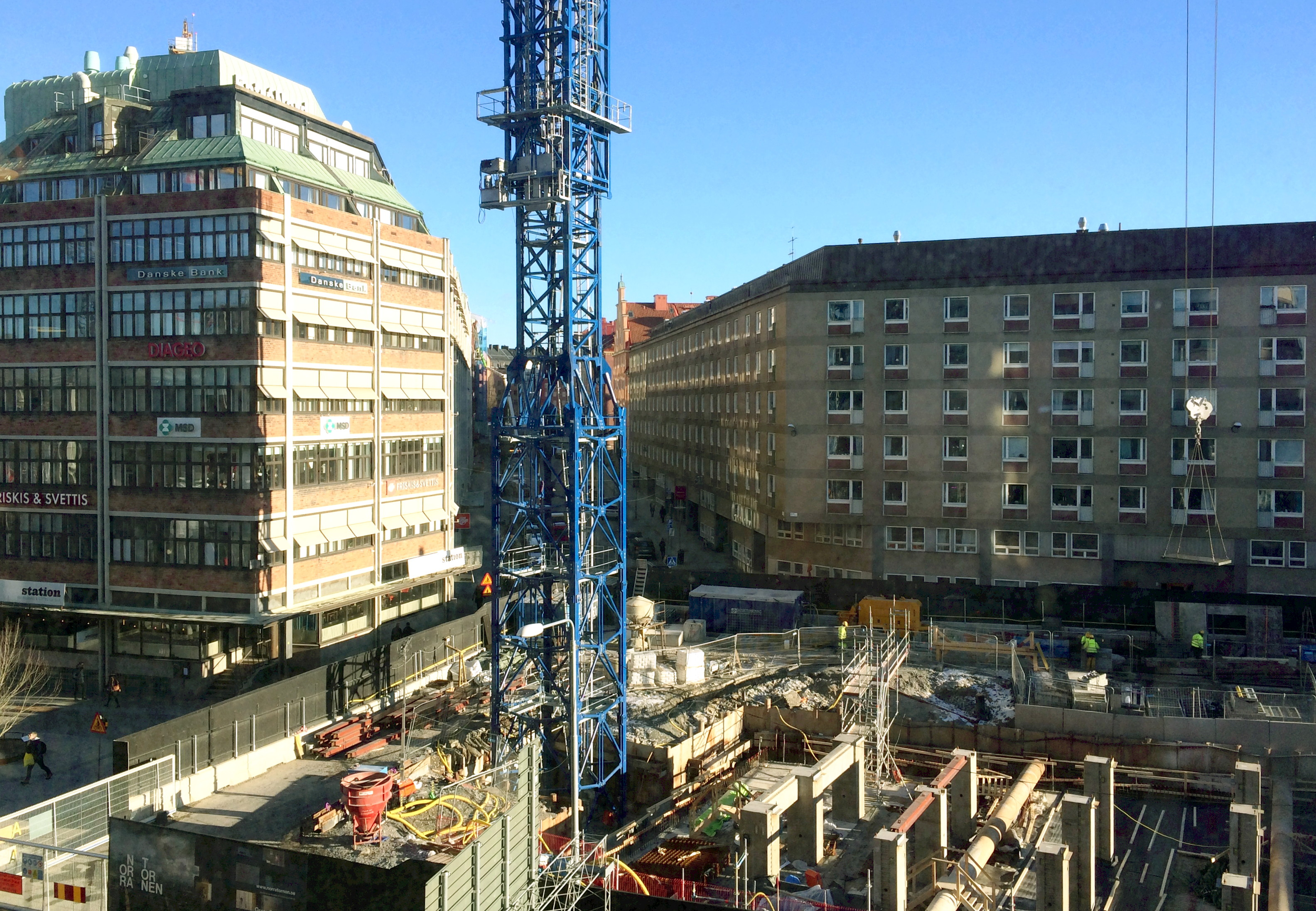
February 2017

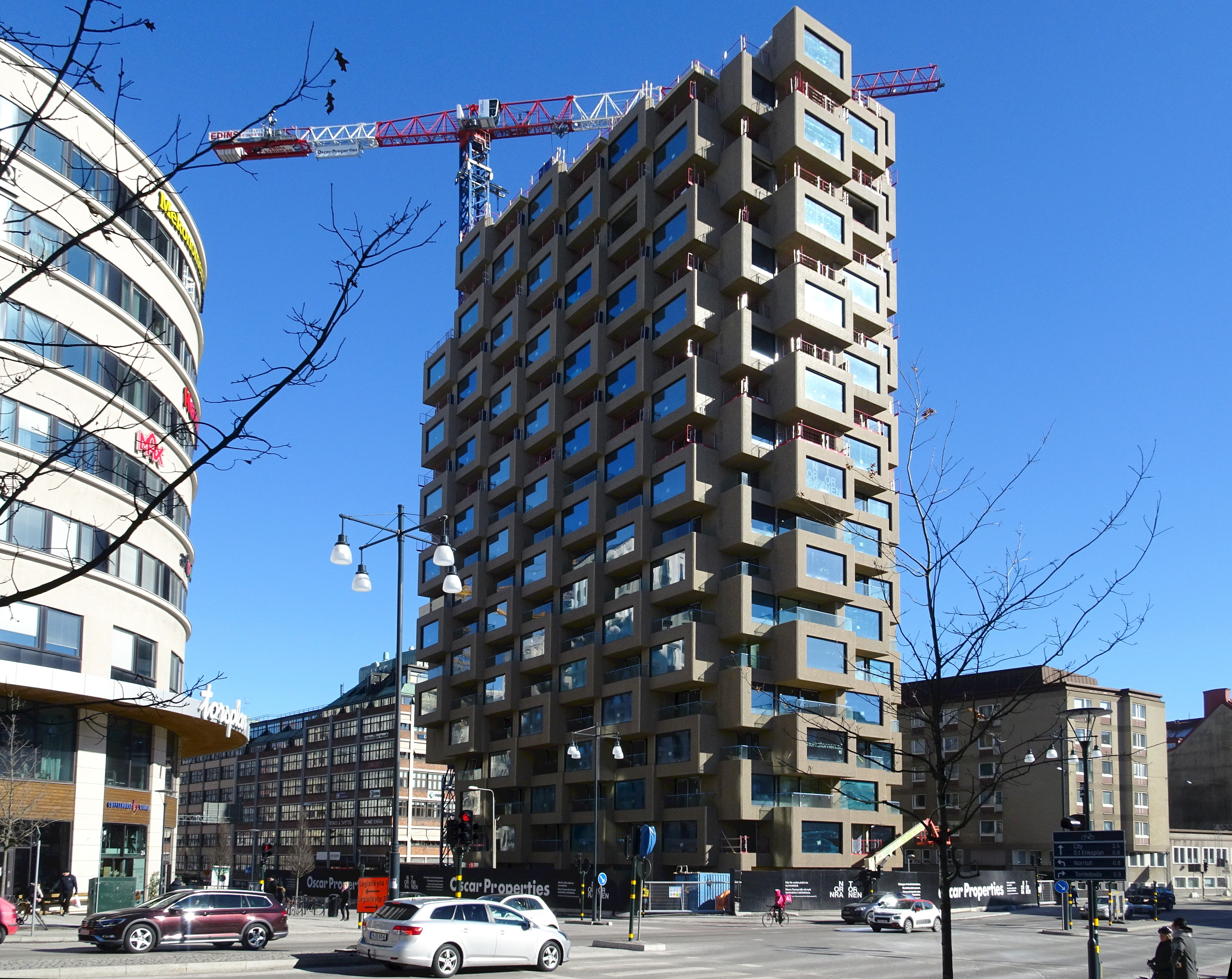
March 2018

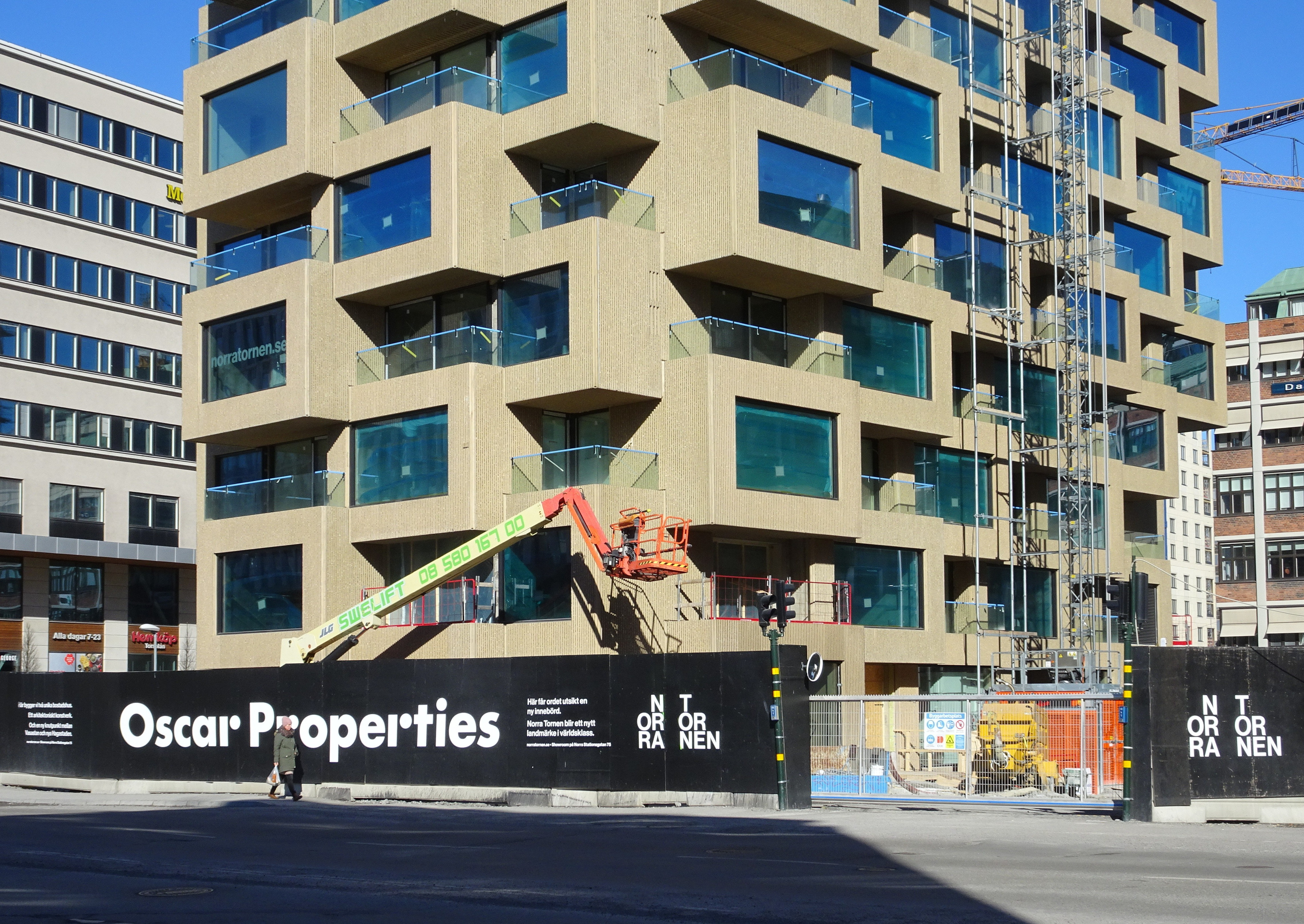
March 2018

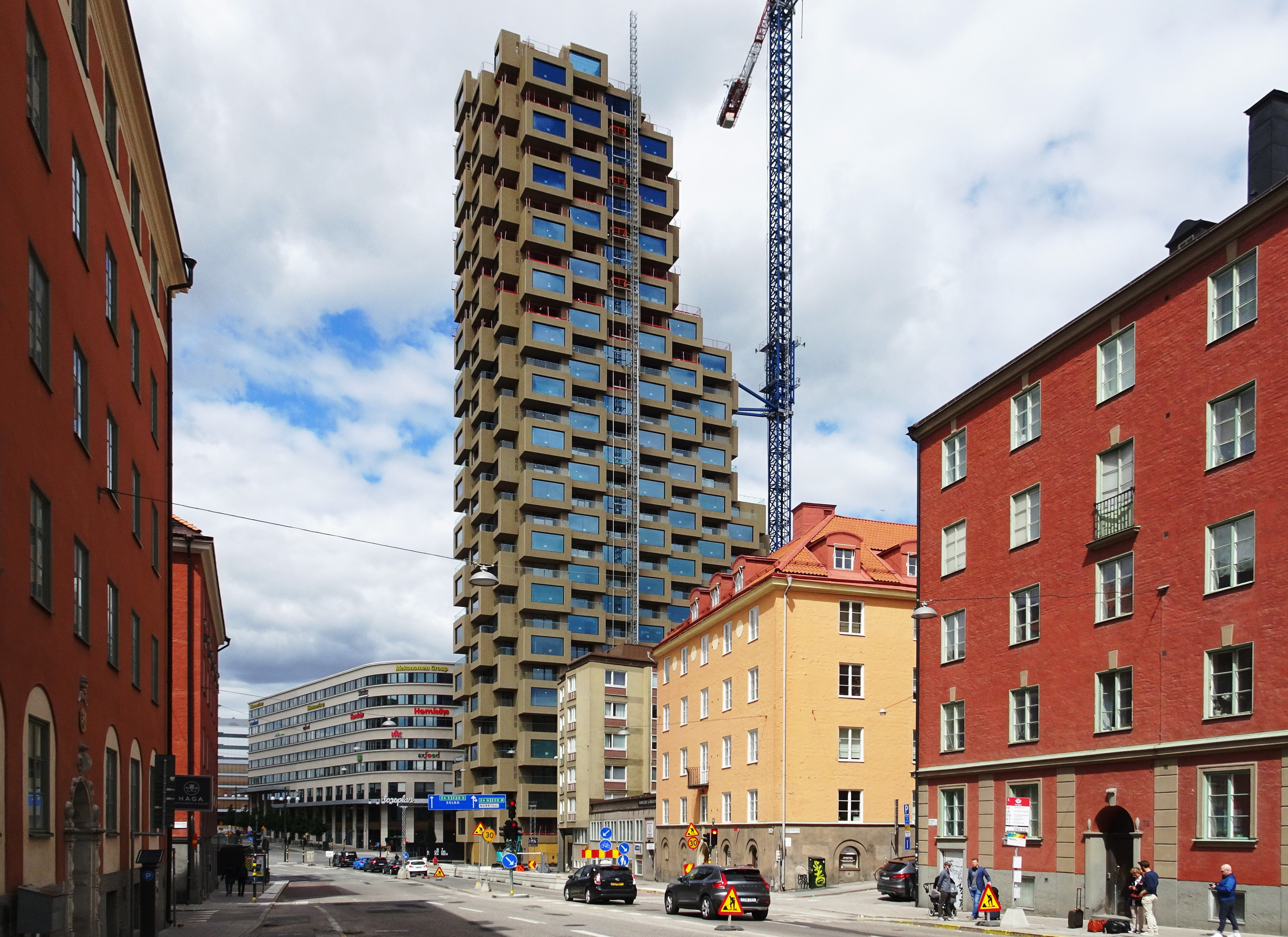
June 2018
Construction of the west tower

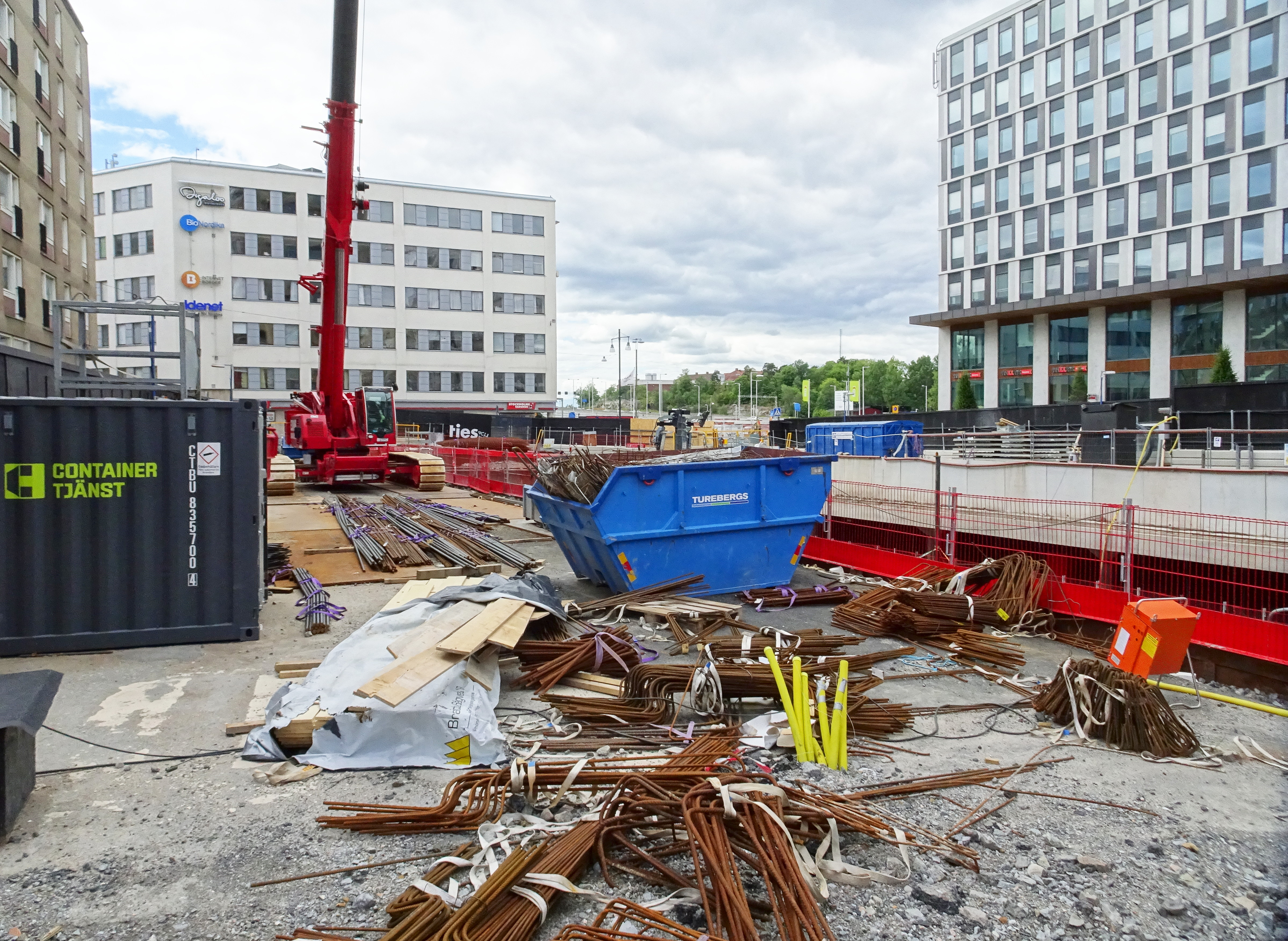
June 2018

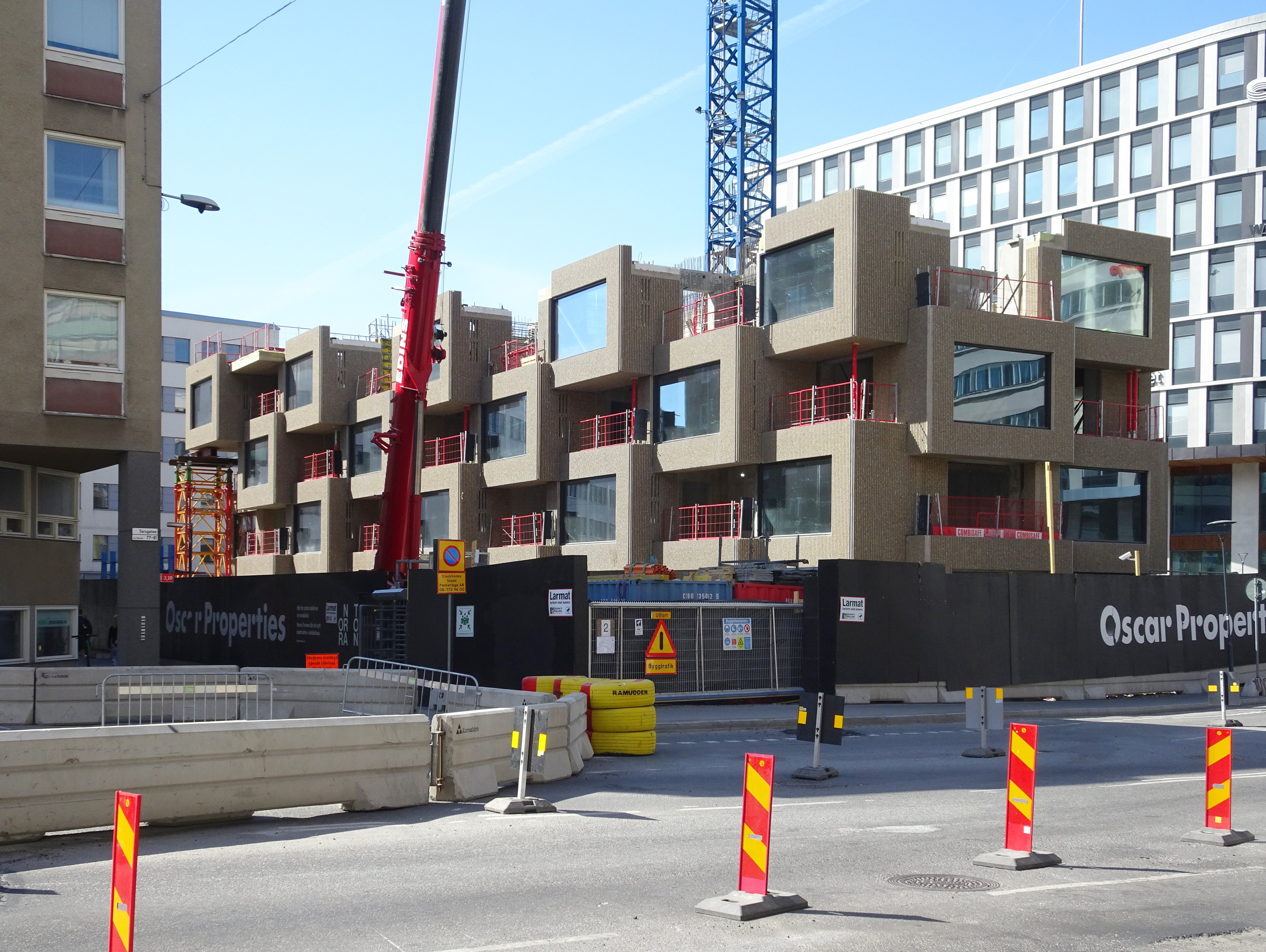
April 2019

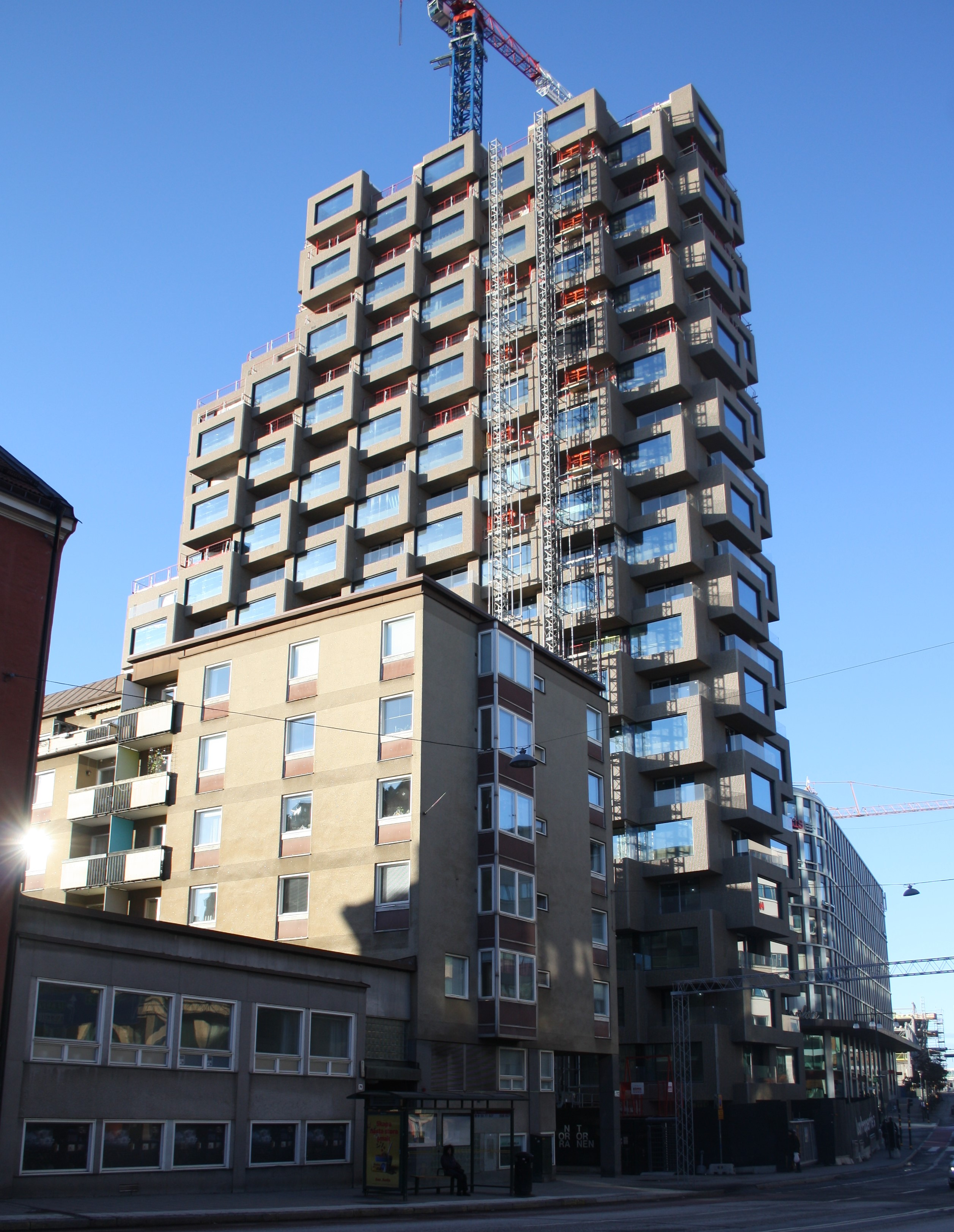
February 2020

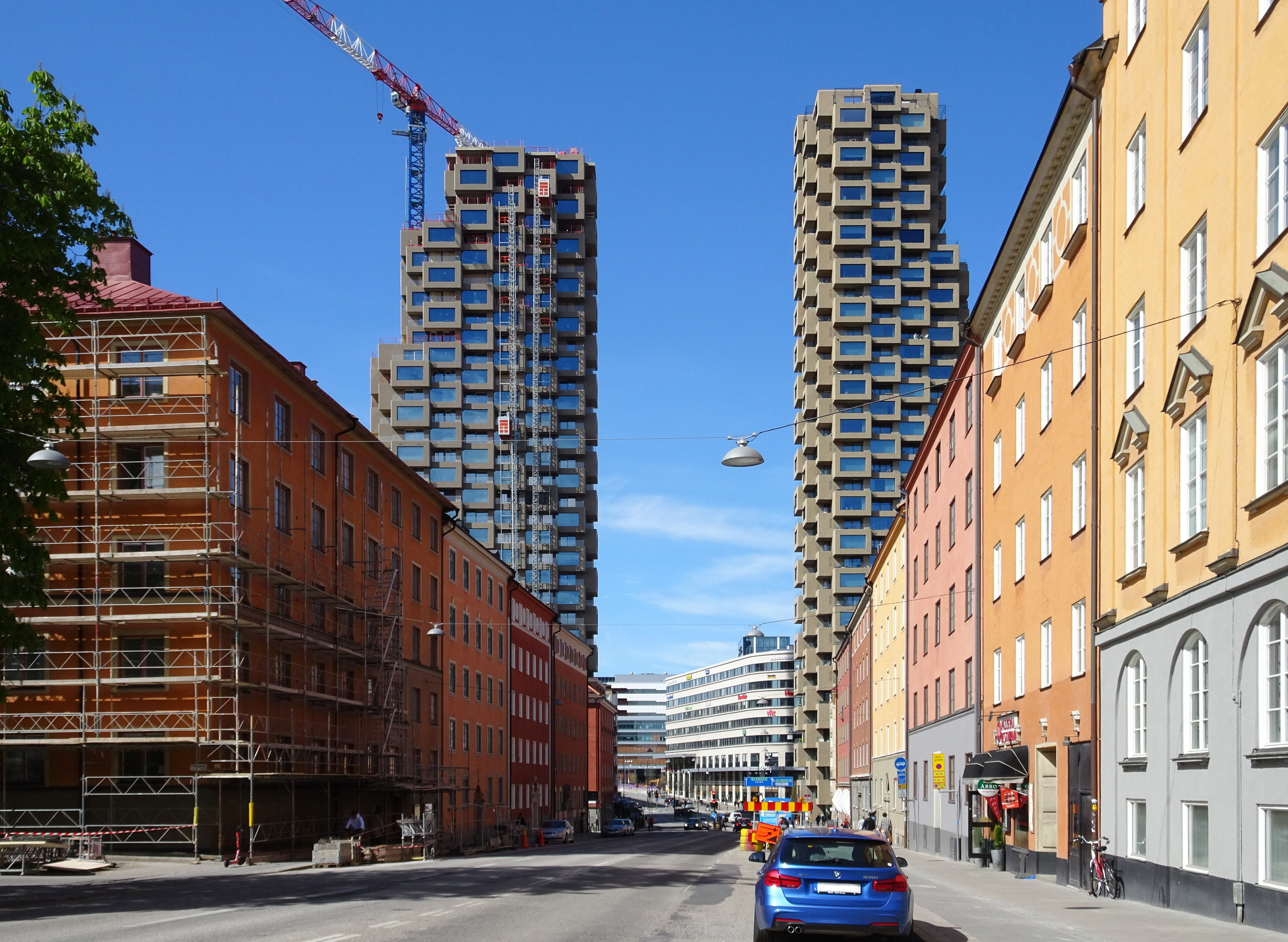
May 2020
