= Kista Galleria =

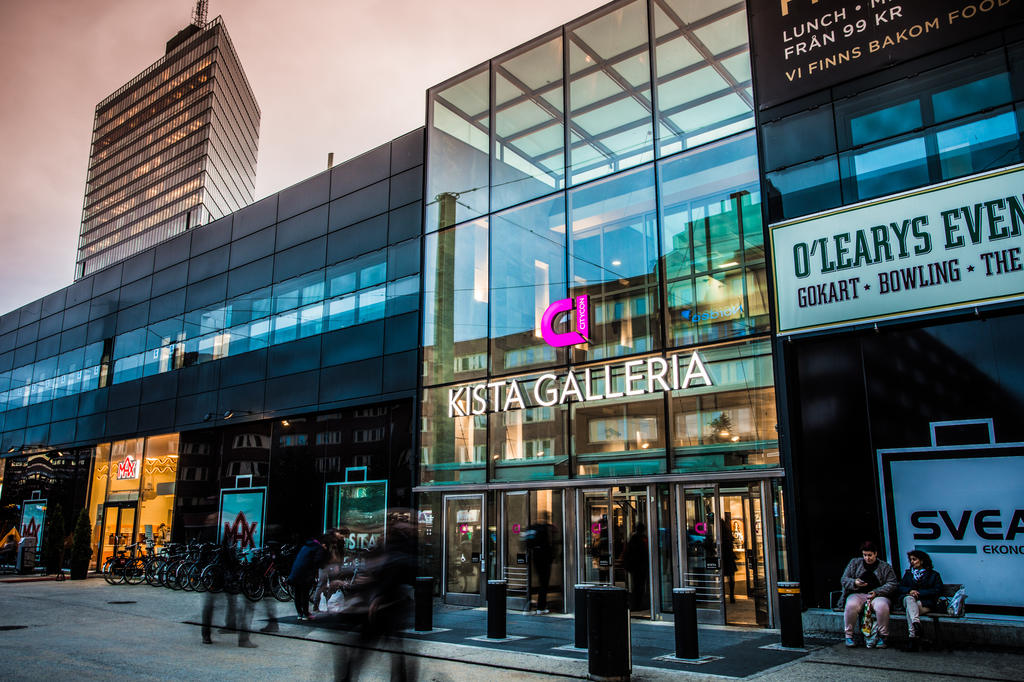
- Location: Kista, Stockholm; Sweden
- Coordinates: 59°24′09.8″N 17°56′42.5″E
- Opened: 1977
- Owner: Citycon 50% CPP Investment Board 50%
- Num. of stores: 185
- Floor area: 92,500 m^{2} (996,000 sq ft)
- Floors: 2
- Parking: 2,500
- Public transit: Kista metro station
- Website: kistagalleria.se

Kista Galleria is a shopping mall located in the Kista Science City in Stockholm, Sweden. It has 185 stores, including a multiplex, bowling alley, karting track and restaurants. Known for its generous opening hours (9 AM to 9 PM), it has been the most visited mall in Stockholm with approximately 18 million customers annually, and the third largest in terms of sales. The mall, which opened in 1977, has expanded and been redesigned several times; most recently in 2002 and again in 2009, increasing the retail area to 62,000 m^{2} (670,000 sq ft), with a total gross leasable area of 90,000 m^{2} (970,000 sq ft).

The shopping mall has 2,500 parking spaces and is situated between two major motorways, E18 and E4. Public transport is close, with entrances in the west leading directly to the Kista metro station. A light rail line is planned to be built in 2016.

From 2014, it has also been hosting the Kista bibliotek, the City of Stockholm Public Library - Kista Branch, which has been named as "Public library of the year 2015" by International Federation of Library Associations and Institutions (IFLA).

The mall is currently managed by Kista Galleria KB, which is co-owned by Finnish real estate company Citycon and Canadian CPP Investment Board.

Compared to other malls in the City of Stockholm

Kista Galleria is the biggest shopping mall in the City of Stockholm with 185 stores and restaurants while for instance Gallerian at Norrmalm has 83.

== See also ==
- List of shopping centres in Sweden
