= Dagens Nyheter Tower =

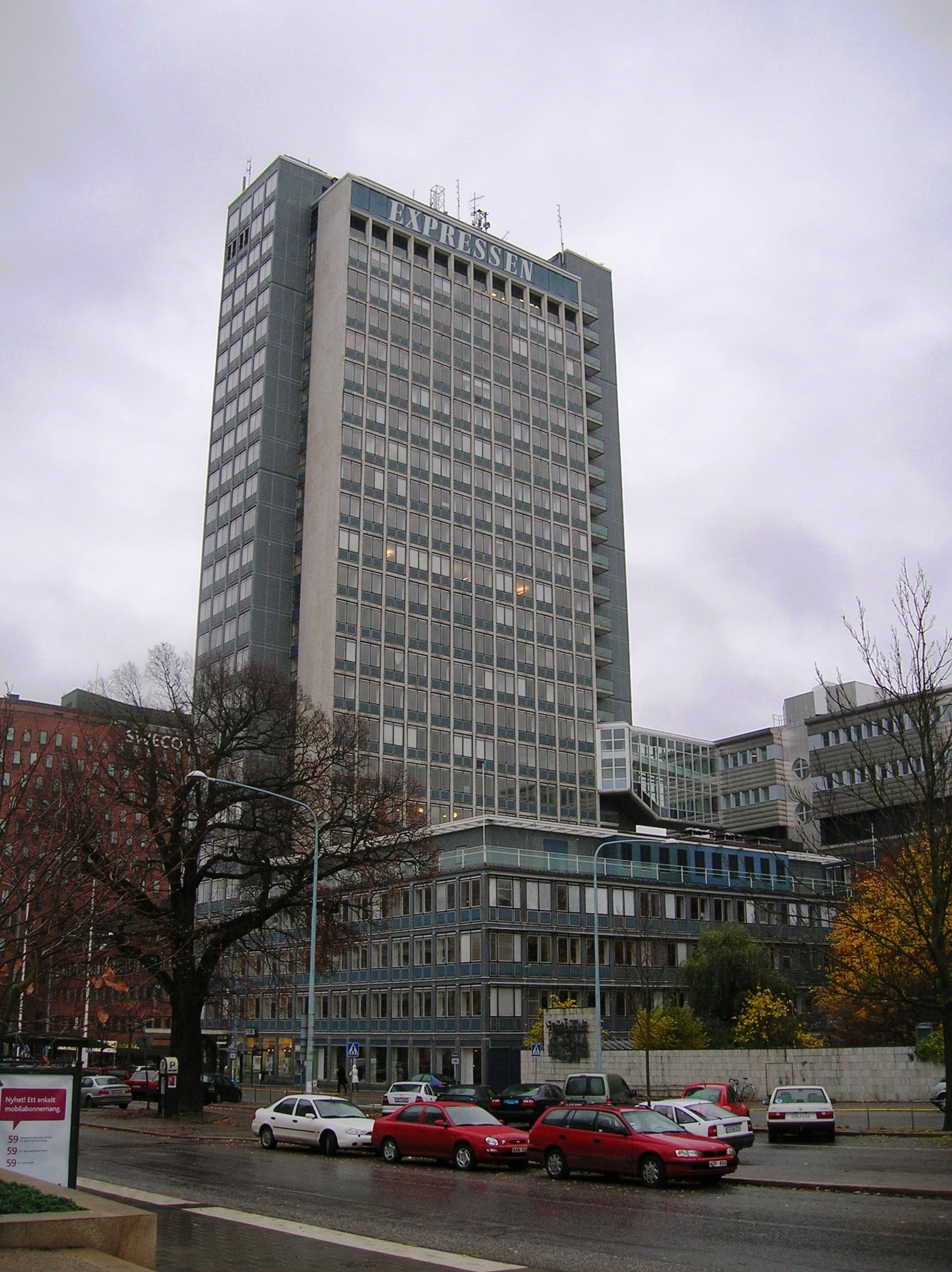
- The DN Tower in November 2005
- Interactive map of the Dagens Nyheter Tower area

General information
- Type: Office
- Location: Rålambsvägen 17, Stockholm, Sweden
- Coordinates: 59°19′41″N 18°00′58″E
- Inaugurated: 24 September 1964

The Dagens Nyheter Tower (Swedish: DN-skrapan, lit. 'DN-Skyscraper') is an office building in the Kungsholmen district of Stockholm, Sweden. It is 84 metres (276 ft) tall and has 27 floors. It was designed by architect Paul Hedqvist and completed in 1964.

It was originally home to Dagens Nyheter, the largest daily newspaper in Sweden. However, in the 1990s, the newspaper moved its offices to a smaller building located in the same complex. The newspaper Expressen is also located in that building. Today, the major building is used by different companies.
