= List of tallest buildings in Scandinavia =

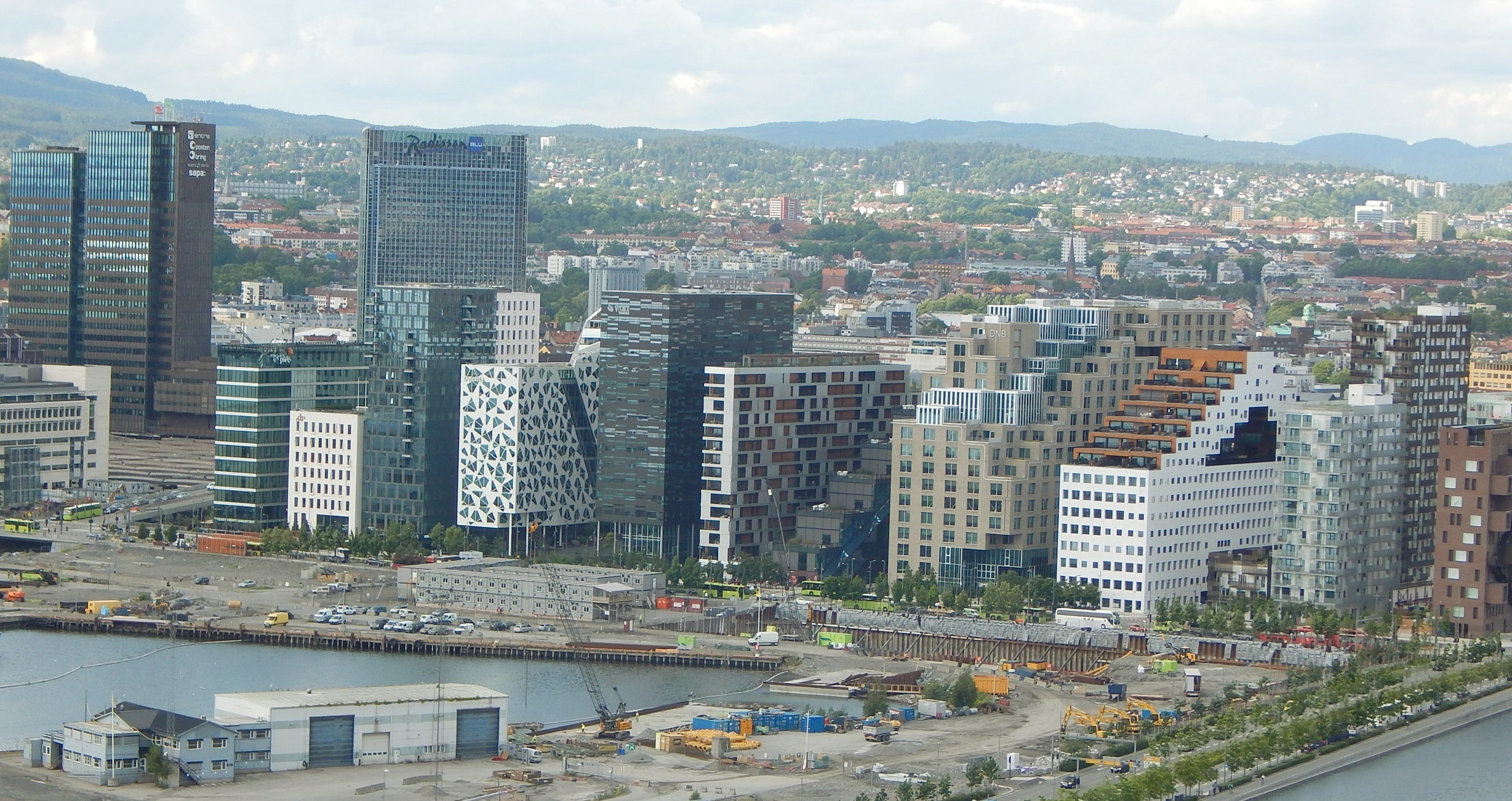
Tall buildings in Oslo.

This list of tallest buildings in Scandinavia ranks skyscrapers in Denmark, Norway, Sweden, and Finland that stand at least 100 m (328 ft) tall. The heights are based on height to architectural top; i.e. heights measured from the level of the lowest, significant, open-air, pedestrian entrance to the top of the building, including spires. Towers with no or few inhabitable floors are not included.

== Completed buildings ==
Was the tallest building in Scandinavia upon completion

Rank	Name	City	Country	Height	Floors	Year	Notes
1	Karlatornet	Gothenburg	Sweden	246 m (807 ft)	74	2024	Tallest building in Sweden, and the tallest building in Scandinavia.
2	Turning Torso	Malmö	Sweden	190 m (623 ft)	57	2005	Won the Emporis Skyscraper Award in 2005. Tallest building in Scandinavia from 2005 to 2024.
3	Gothenburg City Gate	Gothenburg	Sweden	144 m (472 ft)	36	2023	Tallest office building in Scandinavia.
4	Lighthouse 2.0	Aarhus	Denmark	142 m (466 ft)	44	2022	Tallest building in Denmark.
5	Majakka	Helsinki	Finland	134 m (440 ft)	35	2019	Tallest building in Finland.
6	Innovationen	Stockholm	Sweden	125 m (410 ft)	36	2020	Tallest building in Stockholm.
7	Loisto	Helsinki	Finland	124 m (407 ft)	32	2021	
8	Kista Science Tower	Stockholm	Sweden	124 m (407 ft)	32	2003	
9	Lumo One	Helsinki	Finland	120 m (394 ft)	31	2022	
10	Atlas	Helsinki	Finland	120 m (394 ft)	33	2024	
11	Pasteurs Tårn	Copenhagen	Denmark	120 m (394 ft)	37	2022	Tallest building in Copenhagen.
12	Herlev Hospital	Herlev	Denmark	120 m (394 ft)	25	1976	Tallest building in Herlev, and the tallest hospital in Scandinavia.
13	Kista Torn	Stockholm	Sweden	120 m (394 ft)	40	2015	
14	Scandic Victoria Tower	Stockholm	Sweden	118 m (387 ft)	35	2011	Tallest hotel in Scandinavia.
15	Oslo Plaza	Oslo	Norway	117 m (384 ft)	37	1990	Tallest building in Norway from 1990 to 2024.
16	Hotel Draken	Gothenburg	Sweden	115 m (377 ft)	34	2023	
17	Postgrunden	Copenhagen	Denmark	115 m (377 ft)	?	2024	
18	Horisontti	Helsinki	Finland	111 m (364 ft)	26	2025	
19	Point Hyllie	Malmö	Sweden	111 m (364 ft)	27	2019	
20	Posthuset	Oslo	Norway	111 m (364 ft)	26	1975	Height was extended from 80 m to 111 m in 2003.
21	Kineum	Gothenburg	Sweden	110 m (361 ft)	28	2022	
22	Helix	Stockholm	Sweden	110 m (361 ft)	33	2020	
23	Domus Vista	Frederiksberg	Denmark	102 m (335 ft)	30	1969	Tallest building in Frederiksberg.
24	Sthlm 01	Stockholm	Sweden	102 m (335 ft)	27	2020	
25	Gothia New Tower	Gothenburg	Sweden	100 m (328 ft)	28	2014	
26	Bohrs Tårn	Copenhagen	Denmark	100 m (328 ft)	30	2016	
27	Nordbro	Copenhagen	Denmark	100 m (328 ft)	30	2019	

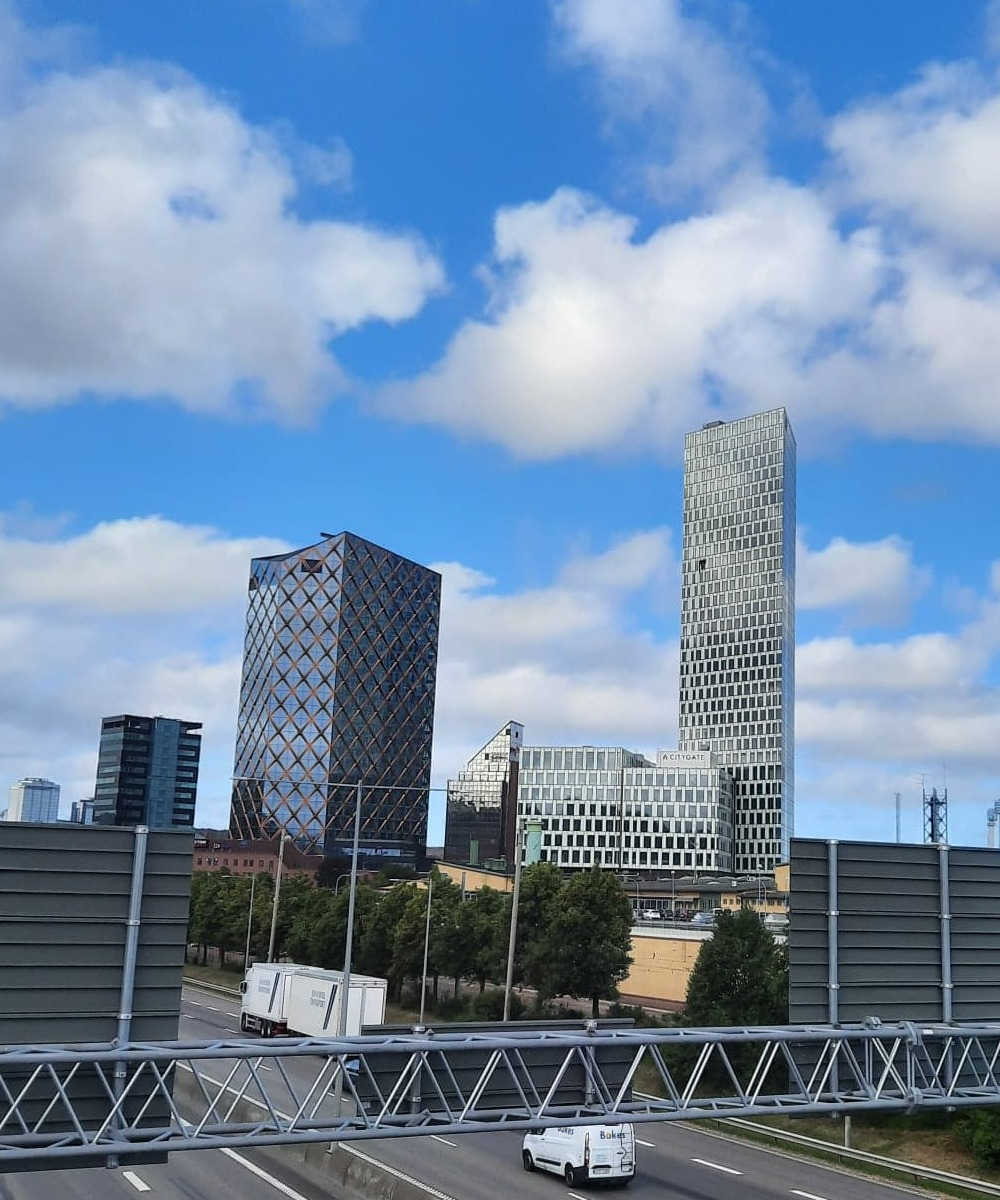
Kineum & Citygate, Gothenburg

== Buildings under construction, approved, or proposed ==
Name	City	Country	Height	Floors	Year	Notes
Trifoliumskrapan	Stockholm	Sweden	200 m (656 ft)	50	2027	
Cassiopeja	Gothenburg	Sweden	147 m (482 ft)	43	2028	Will be a part of Karlstaden.
Mindet 6	Aarhus	Denmark	145 m (472 ft)	38	2027	Under construction, will become the tallest building in Denmark when completed.
+One	Gothenburg	Sweden	140 m (459 ft)	40	2029	
Postens Brevsenter	Oslo	Norway	135 m (443 ft)	36	2029	
Fjordporten (Nordisk Lys)	Oslo	Norway	135 m (443 ft)	36	2029	
The Node	Helsinki	Finland	130 m (427 ft)	32	2028	Under construction.
Auriga	Gothenburg	Sweden	125 m (410 ft)	36	2028	Will be a part of Karlastaden.
Akson Business Tower	Aarhus	Denmark	112 m (367 ft)	26	2026	Under construction
Virgo	Gothenburg	Sweden	103 m (338 ft)	27	2028	Will be a part of Karlstaden.
Høffdings Tårn	Copenhagen	Denmark	100 m (328 ft)	29	2026	

== Unbuilt ==
Name	City	Country	Height	Floors	Cancelled	Notes
Scandinavian Tower	Malmö	Sweden	325 m (1,066 ft)	85	2004	Would have been the tallest building in Europe at a time. Cancelled in April 2004.
Bestseller Tower	Brande	Denmark	320 m (1,050 ft)	44	2020	Was delayed in June 2019 and finally scrapped in 2020 because of a drop in turnover due to the pandemic.
Tellus Tower 1	Stockholm	Sweden	237 m (778 ft)	78	2020	Would have been the second tallest building in Scandinavia after Karlatornet. Cancelled in 2020 due to concerns about their visual impact and shadow cast on areas of national interest.
Malmö Tower	Malmö	Sweden	216 m (709 ft)	62	2007	Cancelled in August 2007, and was replaced by Point Hyllie.
World Ocean Headquarters	Bærum	Norway	200 m (656 ft)	64	2020	Would have been the tallest building in Norway. Cancelled in January 2020 and will be replaced by a smaller building.
Tellus Tower 2	Stockholm	Sweden	177 m (581 ft)	58	2020	A group of smaller high-rise buildings will replace the planned two towers.
Gasklockan	Stockholm	Sweden	140 m (459 ft)	45	2019	Cancelled in November 2019.

== See also ==
- List of tallest buildings in Sweden
- List of tallest buildings in Denmark
- List of tallest buildings in Norway
- List of tallest buildings in Europe
- Tallest buildings in the world
- Karla Tower
