= List of tallest buildings in Norway =

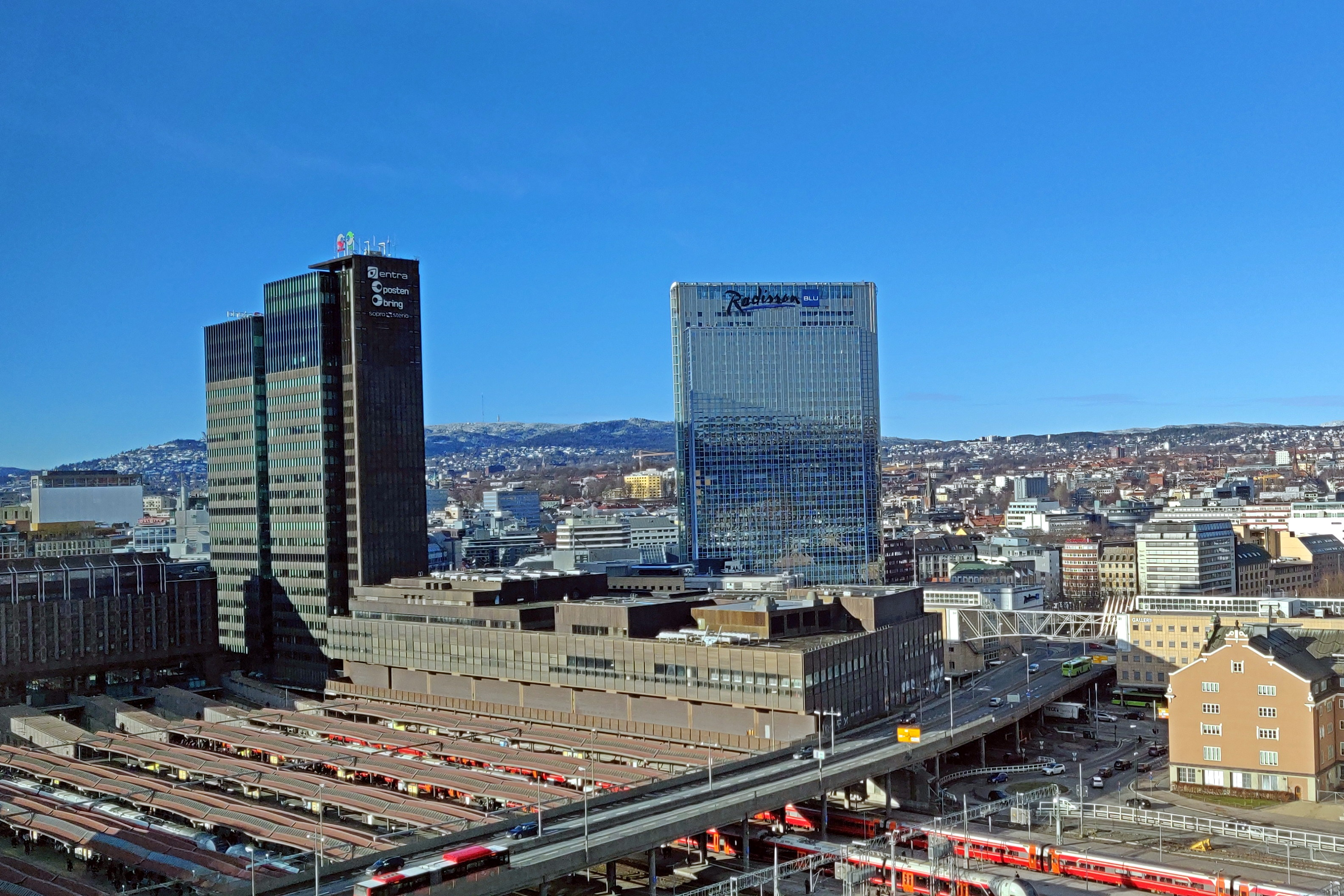
Radisson Blu Plaza Hotel (right) and Posthuset (left) are two of the tallest buildings in Norway.

This is a list of the tallest buildings in Norway.

== Tallest completed buildings ==
Was the tallest building in Norway upon completion

Name	Image	Location	Height	Floors	Year	Notes
Nexans Halden Extrusion Tower II		Halden	153 m (502 ft)	17	2024	Factory
Nexans Halden Extrusion Tower I		Halden	123 m (404 ft)	?	1992/2010	Factory
Radisson Blu Plaza Hotel		Oslo	117 m (384 ft)	37	1989	Hotel
Posthuset		Oslo	112 m (367 ft)	26	1975/2003	Commercial
Fullgjødselfabrikk 4		Porsgrunn	109 m (358 ft)	?	1987	Factory
Nidarosdomen		Trondheim	98 m (322 ft)	?	1090	Church
Jonsknuten hovedsender		Kongsberg	92 m (302 ft)	?	1961	Radio tower
Trinity Church		Arendal	87 m (285 ft)	?	1888	Church
Mjøstårnet		Brumunddal	85.4 m (280 ft)	18	2018	Mixed-use
Scandic Forum Hotel		Stavanger	80 m (260 ft)	21	2001	Hotel
Tyholttårnet		Trondheim	79.7 m (261 ft)	?	1985	Radio tower, restaurant
Scandic Lerkendal Hotel		Trondheim	75 m (246 ft)	21	2014	Hotel
Fredrikstad Cathedral		Fredrikstad	72 m (236 ft)	?	1880	Church
Uranienborg Church		Oslo	70 m (230 ft)	?	1886	Church
Kristiansand Cathedral		Kristiansand	70 m (230 ft)	?	1884	Church
Skien Church		Skien	68 m (223 ft)	22	1889	Church
DnB Nor B		Oslo	67 m (220 ft)	17	2013	
Deloitte Bygget		Oslo	67 m (220 ft)	16	2013	
Oslo City Hall		Oslo	66 m (217 ft)	17	1950	Municipal
Økernsenteret		Oslo	66 m (217 ft)	18	1969	
Forum Jæren		Bryne	65.4 m (215 ft)	18	2009	Mixed-use
KLP-bygget		Oslo	64 m (210 ft)	18	2010	
DnB Nor A		Oslo	63 m (207 ft)	17	2012	
KPMG-bygget		Oslo	62 m (203 ft)	18	2001	
Alcateltårnet		Oslo	62 m (203 ft)	11	1962	
Bragernes Church		Drammen	62 m (203 ft)	?	1871	Church
St. John's Church		Bergen	61 m (200 ft)	?	1894	Church
Helsfyr Panorama		Oslo	60 m (200 ft)	17	2003	
Stenersgata 2		Oslo	59 m (194 ft)	15	2000	
Thorvald Meyersgata 5		Oslo	59 m (194 ft)	19	1960	
Ind-Eks-huset		Oslo	57 m (187 ft)	20	1965	
DnB Nor C		Oslo	56 m (184 ft)	15	2013	
Universitetsgata 2		Oslo	56 m (184 ft)	19	1962	
Fantoft Student Housing		Bergen	55 m (180 ft)	20	1971	Student accommodation
Fagerborg Church		Oslo	55 m (180 ft)	5	1903	Church
DnB-bygget		Bergen	55 m (180 ft)	15	1982	
Sykehuset Buskerud HF		Drammen	55 m (180 ft)	14	1980	

== Tallest under construction or proposed ==
Name	Location	Height m (ft)	Floors	Status	Note
World Ocean Headquarters	Bærum	200 m (656 ft)	64	Rejected	
Urban Mountain	Oslo	137.6 m (451 ft)	31	Proposed	
Breiavatnet Lanterna	Stavanger	101 m (331 ft)	26	Proposed	
