= Point Hyllie =

Part of Hyllie, Malmö, Sweden

Coordinates: 55°33′46″N 12°58′35″E

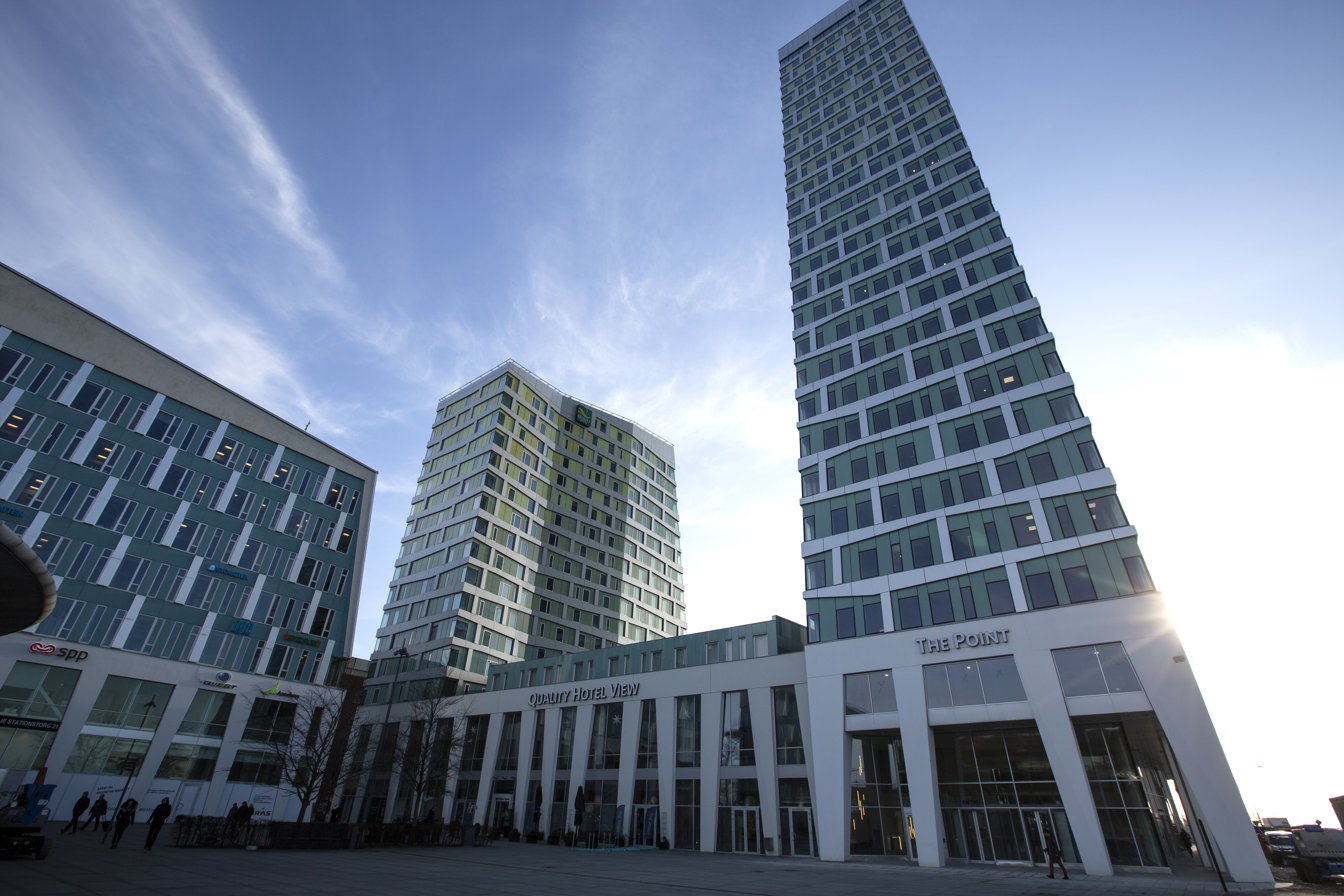
- Point Hyllie
- Interactive map of the Point Hyllie area

General information
- Location: Malmö, Sweden
- Construction started: 2009
- Completed: 2019
- Client: City of Malmö

Height
- Height: 110 m (360 ft)

Design and construction
- Architect: C. F. Møller Architects

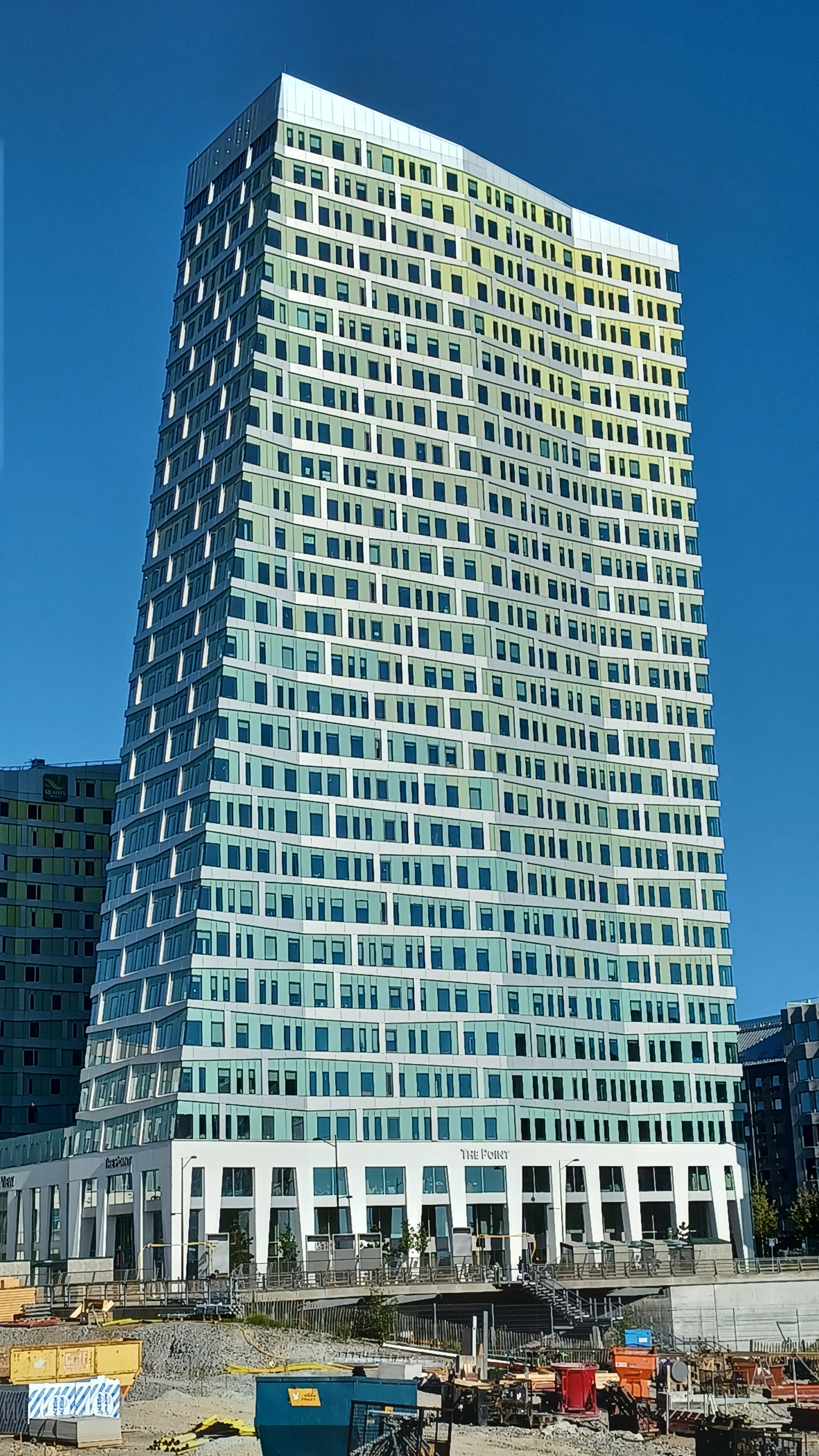
The Point, office building, Hyllie.

Point Hyllie is a residential, office and hotel complex in Hyllievång in the district of Hyllie in southwest Malmö. The complex includes shops, restaurants, offices and tenant-owned apartments and is located in the middle of the new Hyllie district with the Emporia shopping mall, Hyllie station and Malmö Arena as its closest neighbors. Construction started in late summer 2009 and the last building, The Point, reached full height in spring 2019 and is Sweden's second tallest office building with a height of 110 meters and 29 floors.

== Background ==
Point Hyllie is a replacement for the scrapped Malmö Tower project. The original plan was for the complex to include a tall skyscraper with 62 floors and a height of 216 meters, which would have made it the third tallest residential building in Europe and the tallest in Sweden. In August 2007, developer Annehem AB announced that the plans for the skyscraper were scrapped. Instead, a much lower building will be constructed.

Property manager Annehem signed an agreement with the City of Malmö for a commercial and residential project adjacent to the new Citytunnel station in Hyllie. Annehem nominated four architectural firms; White Arkitekter, Sweden, Coop Himmelb(l)au, Austria, Snøhetta A/S, Norway and C. F. Møller Architects, Denmark. The plan was for Annehem AB to have two buildings around the new square in Hyllievång, a square house and a station house. All the architectural firms had proposals for two buildings each.

The winning proposal was selected on August 21, 2006 and it was "Svea torg" from a design by Danish architect Lone Wiggers of C. F. Møller A/S. The proposal consisted of a 110 meter high skyscraper and a smaller building next to it with, among other things, office space. The skyscraper was intended to have around 230 apartments. The tower would be located right next to the new Citytunnel station and a short distance from the current Hyllie water tower, which has been on Hyllievång since 1973. The jury that selected the winner described the tower as "a strong Scandinavian identity and an architecture that expresses our time".

== See also ==
- List of tallest buildings in Sweden
- Scandinavian Tower
- Citytunneln
- List of tallest buildings in Scandinavia

== Gallery ==
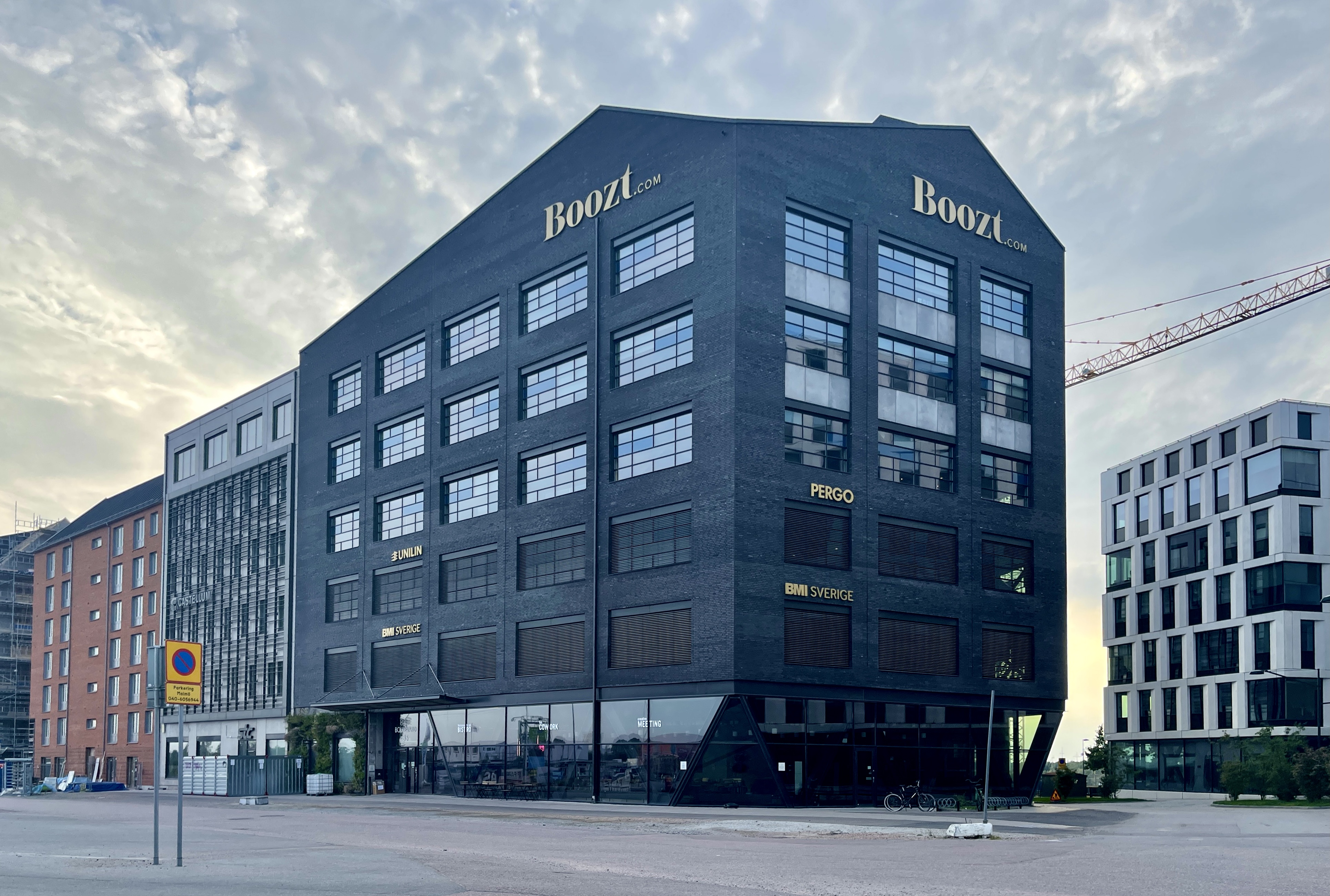
Office building, Hyllie Boulevard 35, Hyllie.

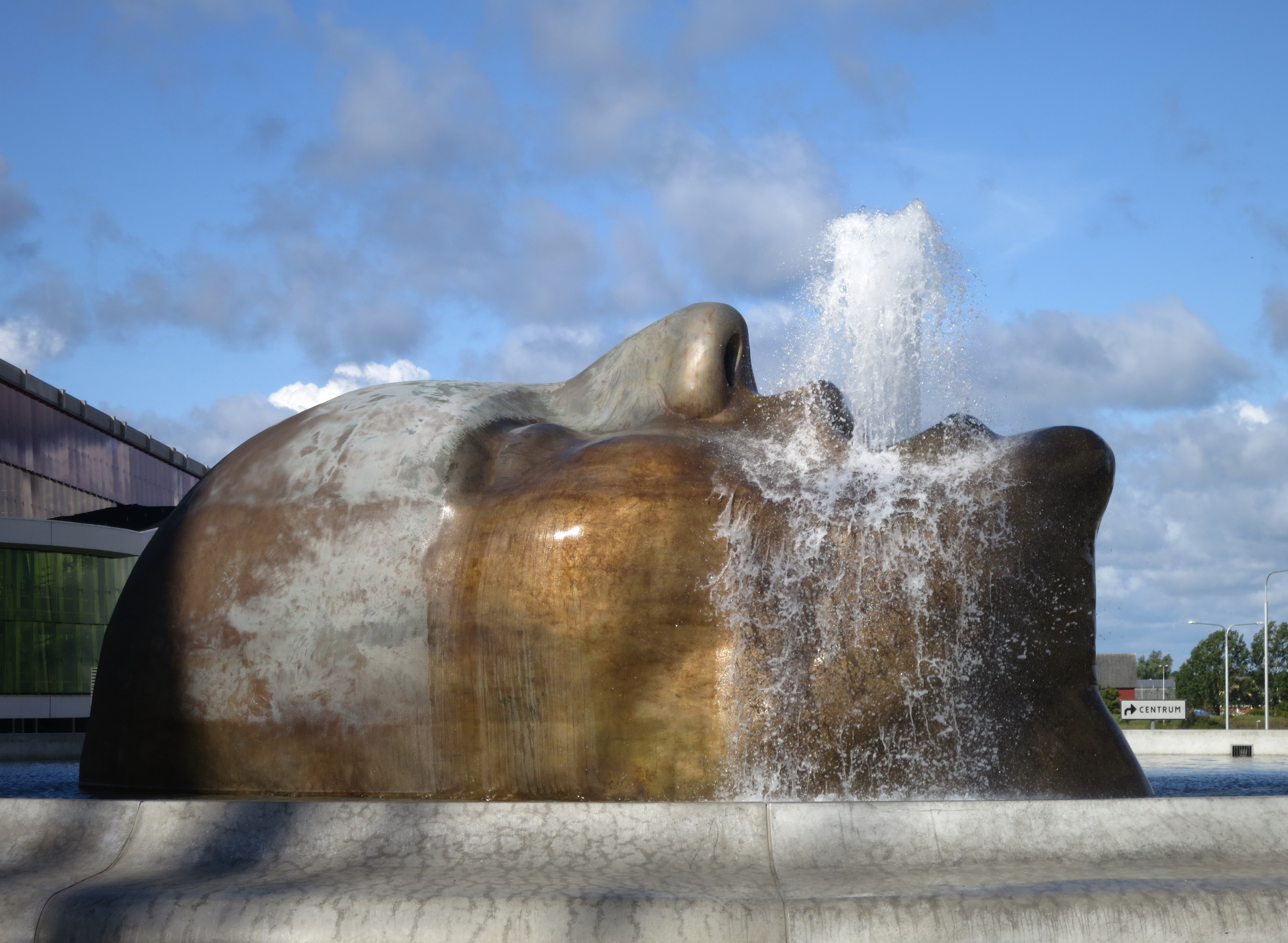
Mother. Fountain by Charlotte Gyllenhammar, 2014. Hyllie.

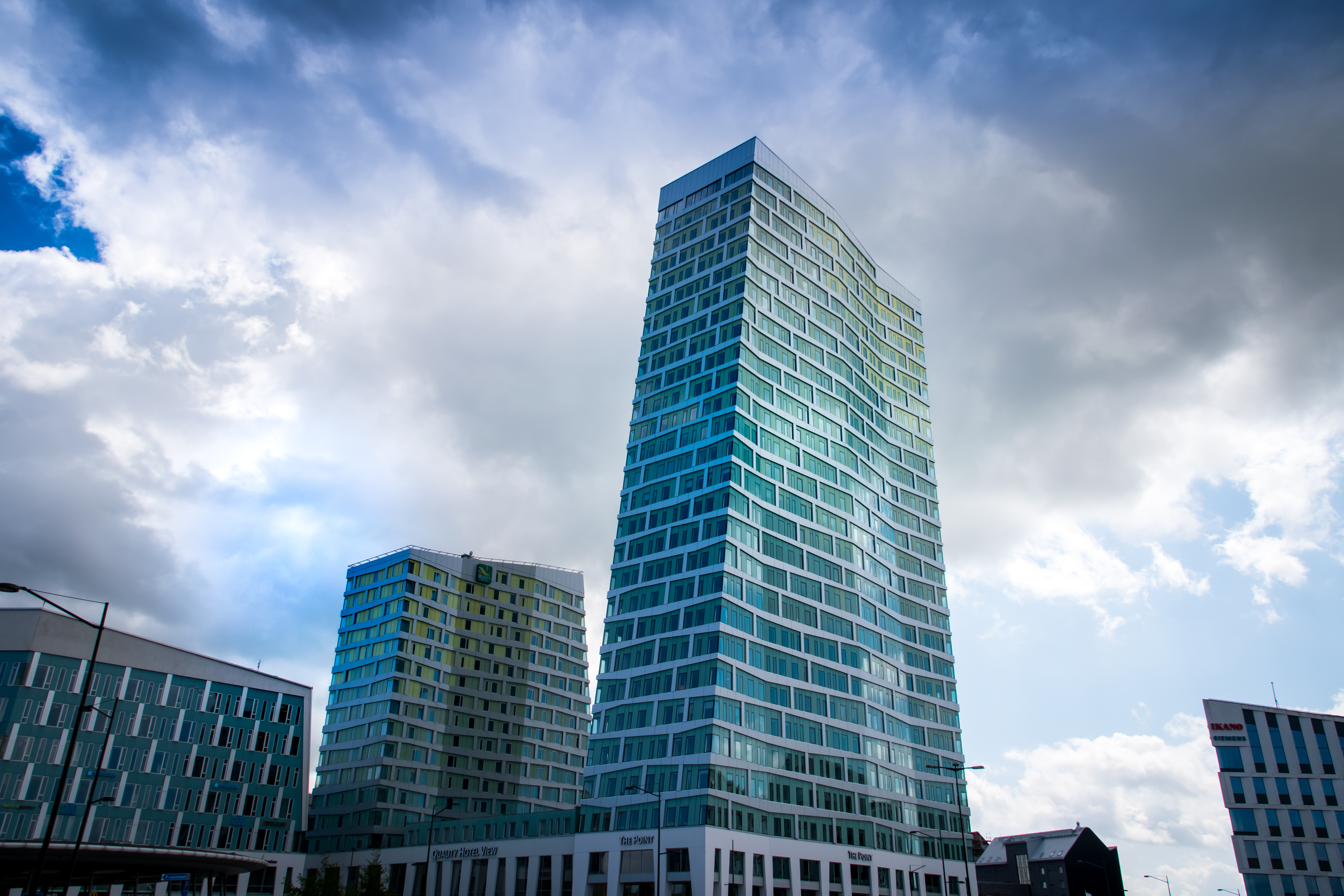
