= Slettebakken =

Neighborhood in Bergen, Norway

Coordinates: 60.359°N 5.362°E

Slettebakken is a neighborhood in the borough of Årstad in Bergen. It has approximately 7,514 residents and covers 112 km^{2} of land and 0.04 km^{2} of freshwater. The neighborhood is bordered by Minde to the west, Kronstad to the north, Landås to the east and Fantoft and Nattlandsfjellet to the south.

Bergenshallen, Slettebakken Church, Slettebakken School, the International School of Bergen, Langhaugen High School and Sletten Center are among the notable landmarks. Three light rail stops serve the neighborhood (Slettebakken, Sletten, and Brann stadion). The neighborhood is served by the local newspaper Årstadposten.
