= Radisson Blu Scandinavia Hotel, Oslo =

Norwegian hotel

Coordinates: 59°55′6.21″N 10°44′3.51″E

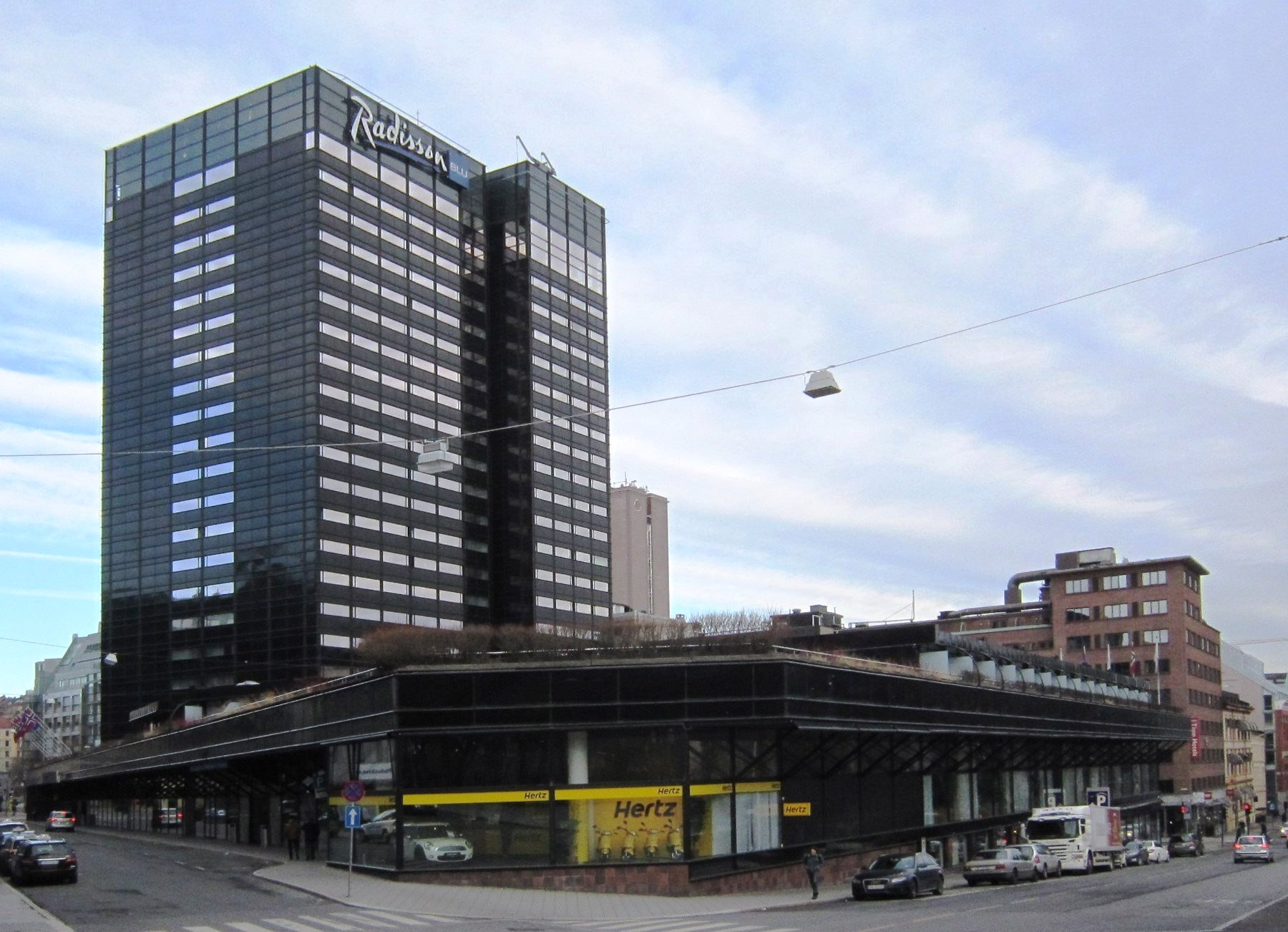
- Interactive map of the Radisson Blu Scandinavia Hotel, Oslo area
- Former names: SAS Scandinavia Hotel
- Alternative names: The SAS Hotel
- Hotel chain: Radisson Blu

General information
- Status: Completed
- Location: Holbergsgate 30, Oslo, Norway
- Opened: 1975

Other information
- Number of rooms: 499

Website
- Hotel website

The Radisson Blu Scandinavia Hotel, Oslo is a hotel in Oslo, Norway, just east of the Palace Park near Holbergs plass. The 22-story, 67 metres (220 ft), 488-room hotel is Oslo's third tallest building.

== History ==
The hotel was constructed by the SAS Catering & Hotels division of Scandinavian Airlines System. It opened in June 1975 as the Hotel Scandinavia, operated by the US-based Western International Hotels chain, which was renamed Westin Hotels in 1981. Westin ceased operating the Hotel Scandinavia on December 1, 1983, and it was renamed SAS Hotel Scandinavia, with the airline operating it directly through their SAS Hotels subsidiary. In 1987, it was slightly renamed, becoming SAS Scandinavia Hotel. In 1994, the hotel was renamed Radisson SAS Scandinavia Hotel Oslo when SAS and Radisson Hotels signed a joint marketing agreement. When SAS and Radisson ceased the marketing agreement in February 2009, the hotel remained with Radisson and was renamed the Radisson Blu Scandinavia Hotel, Oslo.

== See also ==
- Radisson Blu Plaza Hotel, Oslo
