= Kineum =

Office skyscraper in Gothenburg, Sweden

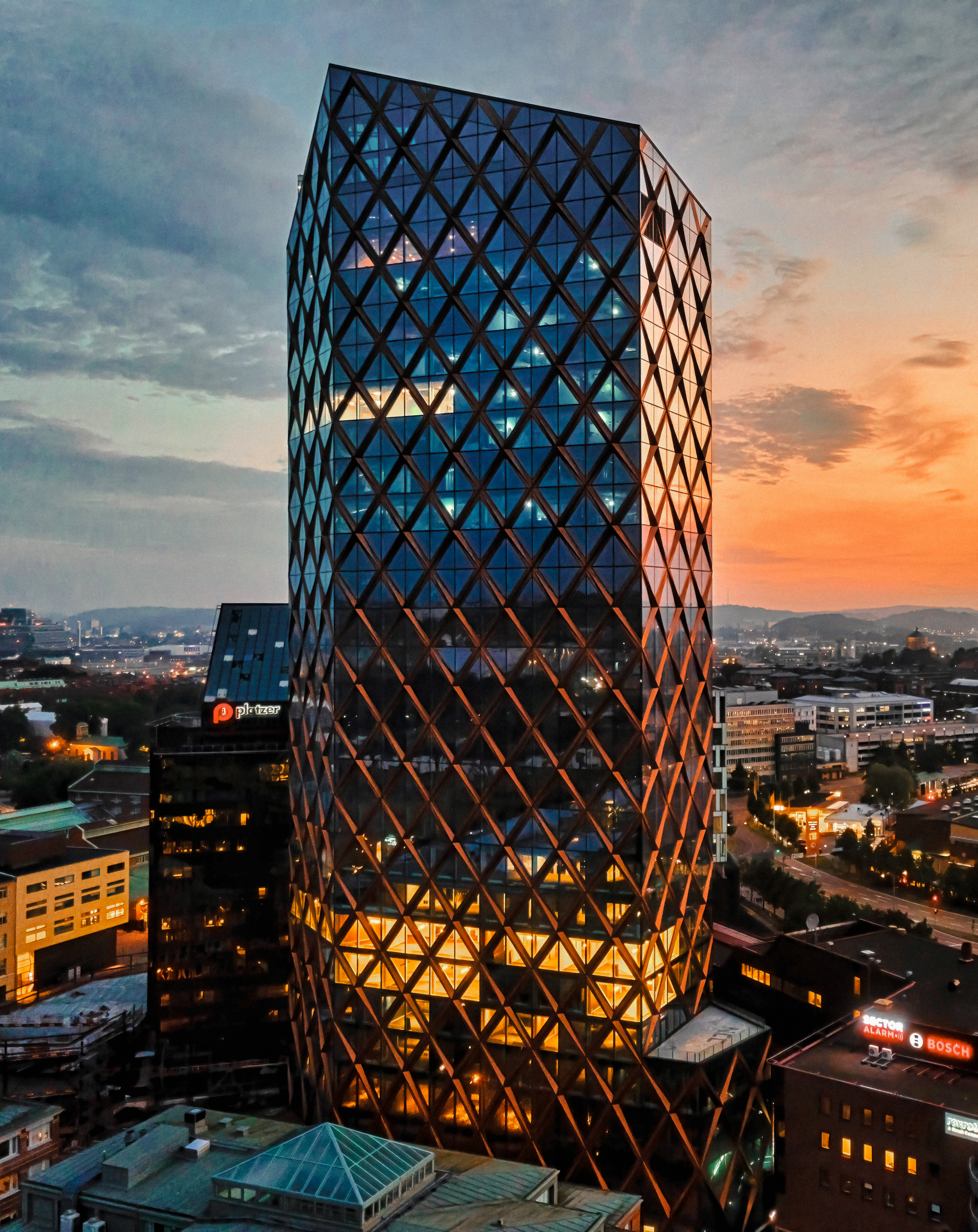
- Interactive map of the Kineum area

General information
- Type: Office/Hotel
- Location: Drakegatan 6, Gothenburg, Sweden
- Coordinates: 57.70590°N 11.99417°E
- Construction started: 2018
- Completed: 2022

Height
- Roof: 110 m (361 ft)

Technical details
- Floor count: 28

Design and construction
- Architect: Reflex Architects
- Main contractor: NCC

The Kineum is a mixed-use high-rise building in the Gårda District of Gothenburg, Sweden. Built between 2018 and 2022, the tower stands at 110 m (361 ft) with 28 floors and is the eighth tallest building in Sweden.

== History ==
The building was completed in 2022 and for a time became one of the tallest hotel and office buildings in the Nordic region. Kineum has 28 floors and is 110 meters high. In addition to office space, the building also includes a hotel, restaurants, a flower shop, a gym, a roof terrace and a swimming pool.

The hotel's name is Jacy'z and it is operated by Jacy'z Hotel & Resort. The hotel has 233 rooms and fourteen floors. There are several different restaurants and bars and in an adjacent building a meeting and event space with a rooftop terrace and pool.

== Architecture ==
=== Design ===
The facade concept is based on the history of what Gothenburg was and is. The cranes in the harbor and the structure of the fishermen's nets are both elements that are strongly associated with the city. The net also connects to the networks that the mixed activities in Kineum enable.

On the entrance level there is a common hotel lobby and reception as well as several different restaurants and conference departments, parts of which will also be located in the older building, Gårda Business Center, which Kineum connects to. Over the first three floors with hotel, conference and restaurant operations are a few office floors and then nine floors with a hotel. This is followed by more office floors.

At the top there is another restaurant and the hotel's spa with pools on floors 27 and 28. Each floor in the high-rise building is approximately 920 square meters in size and can be divided into just over 200 square meters. Another detail that makes the house unique is the choice of a diamond-shaped glass roof. It forms the fifth facade of the building. The angles of the roof create a verticality and a beautiful silhouette. The house is environmentally certified according to BREEAM excellent.

=== Facades ===
The house consists of just over a thousand facade elements made of glass and aluminum, which give the house its characteristic expression. Around 100 floor-high glass triangles are used per floor. The elements are based on the maximum size of jumbo size flat glass (3.20 x 6.00 meters) which is divided into six triangles to minimize waste. The glass is held in place with a unique aluminum profile system, which is deepest in the cross itself and protrudes half a meter there. The thickness of the cross is carefully calculated and helps to reduce solar heat loads. This creates a balance between the transparent and dense facade parts and contributes to pleasant light at the workplaces and in the hotel rooms.

== Gallery ==
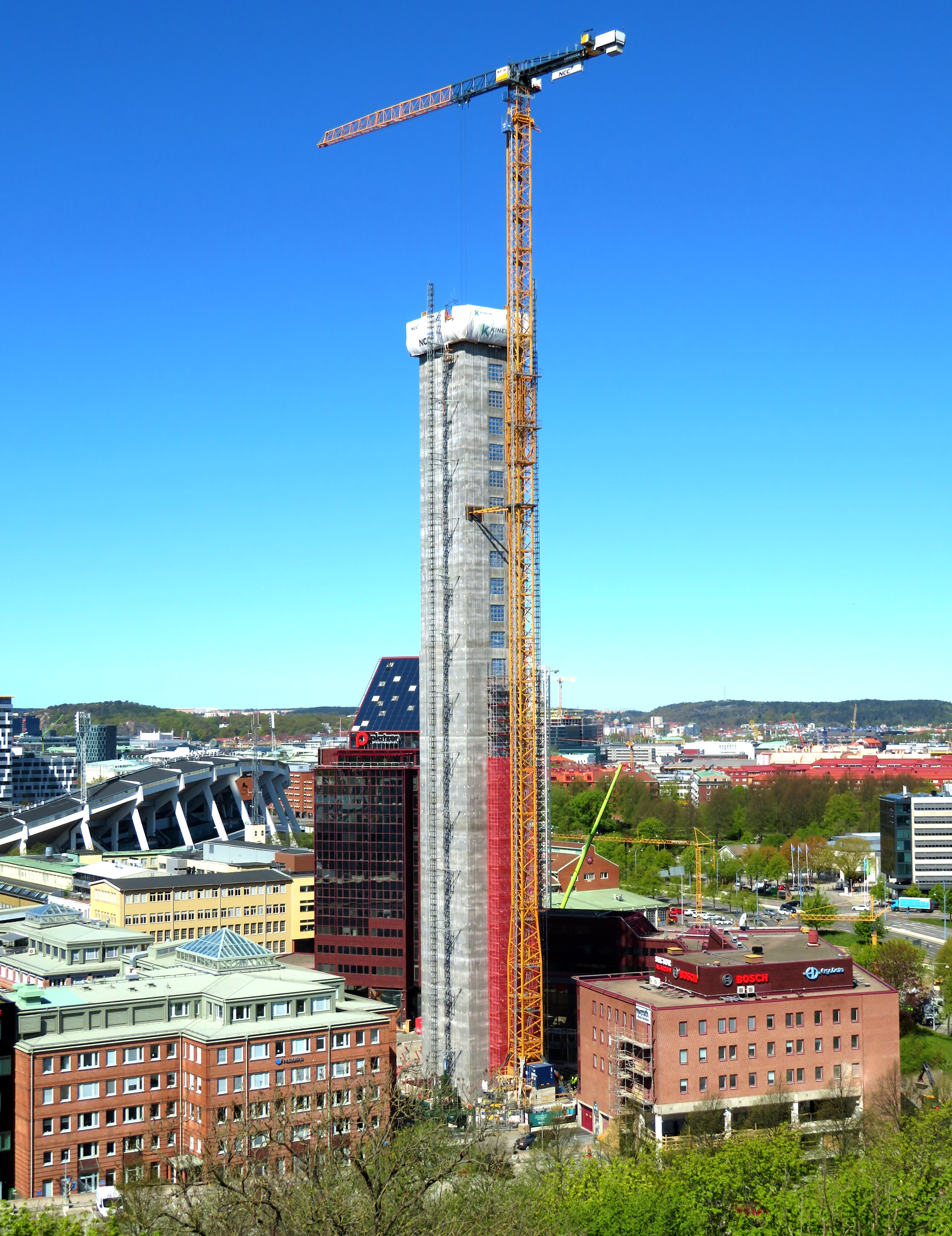
Kineum's concrete frame in April 2020

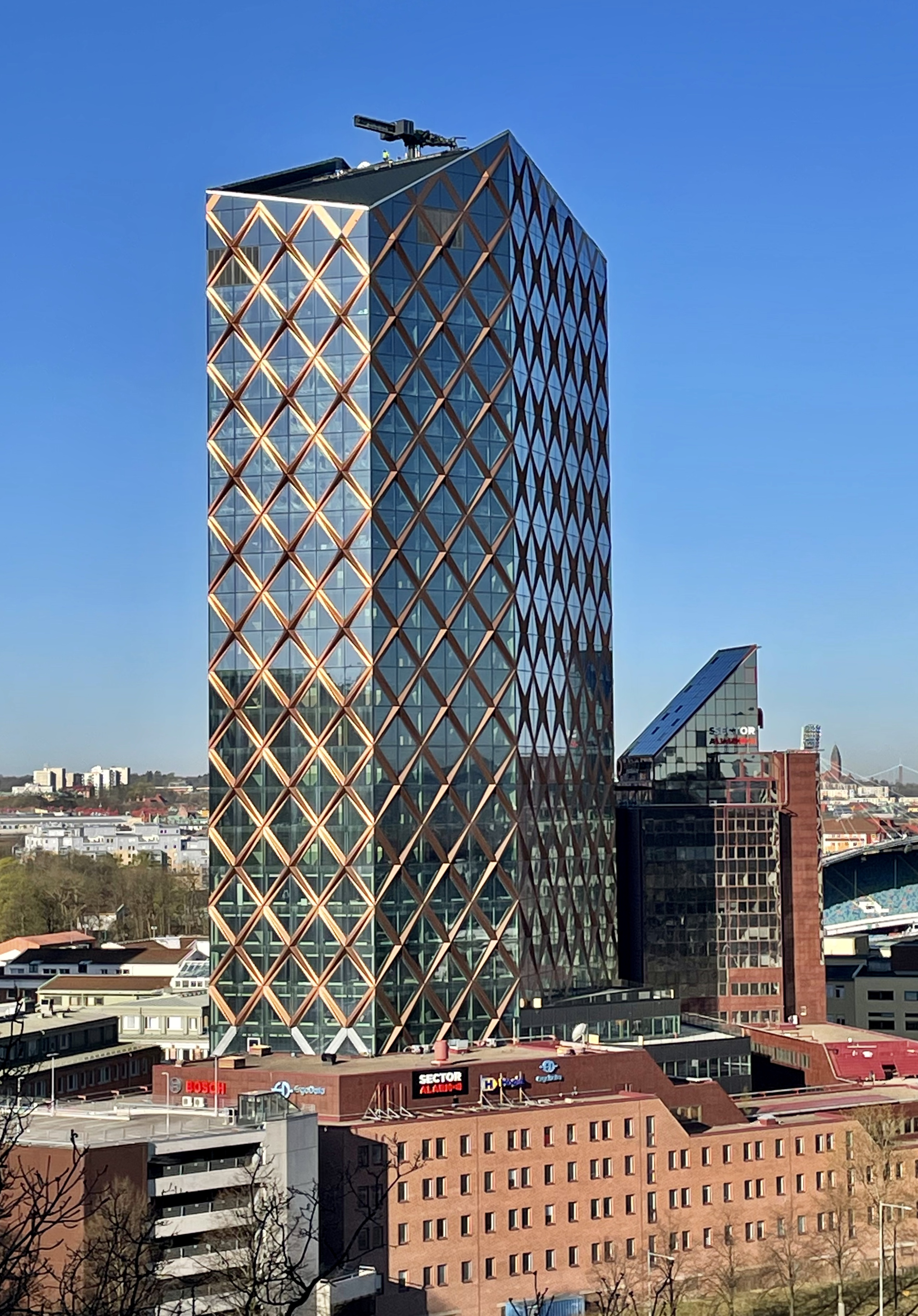
General view

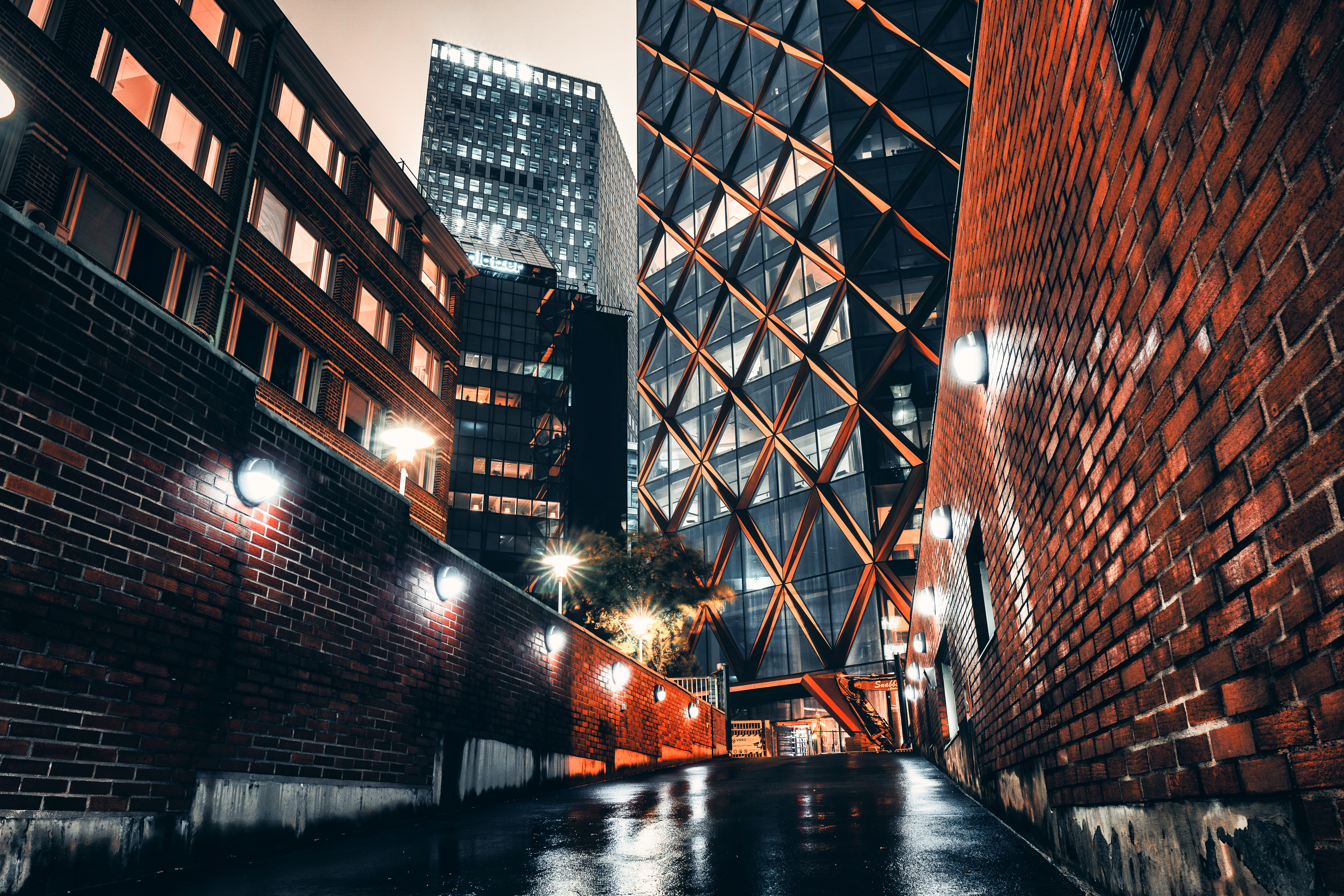
Ground-level view

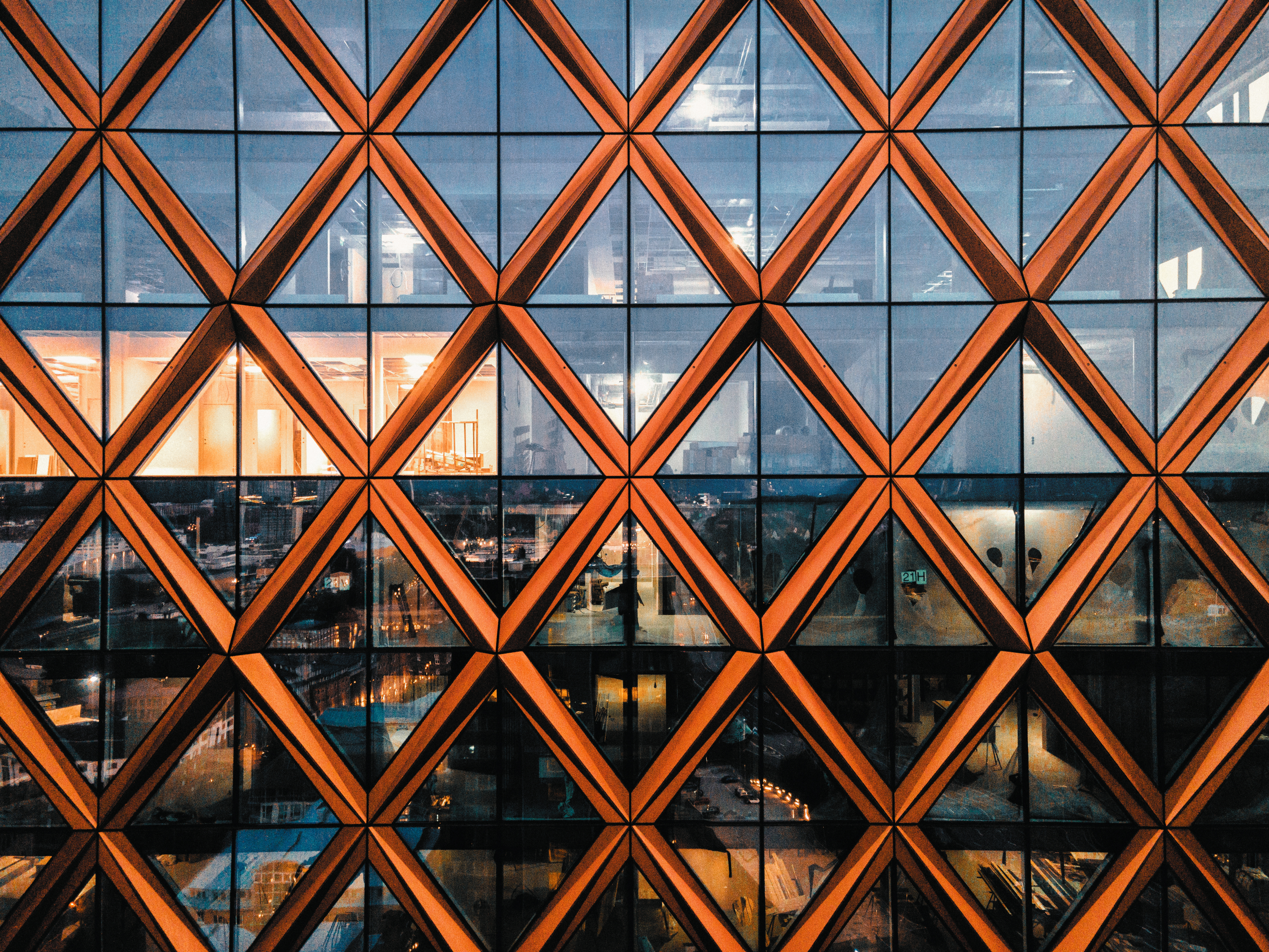
Facade detail

== See also ==
- List of tallest buildings in Sweden
- List of tallest buildings in Scandinavia
