= Fantoft =

Neighbourhood of Bergen, Norway

Coordinates: 60°20′46.284″N 5°21′13.280″E

Fantoft is a neighborhood of the district of Årstad in Bergen, Norway. This includes Slettebakken church, Fantoft, Slettebakken and Øvre Nattland with a total of 4097 inhabitants and 0.8 km² of land, and 0.1 km² fresh water. The area lies to the south of Tveitevannet and borders the districts of Paradis in the suburb of Fana to the South and West, and the districts of Slettebakken to the north and Nattlandsfjellet to the east (both in the suburb of Årstad).

Slettebakken Church, Fantoft Studentboliger, Nattland studentby, Fantoft Stave Church, Slettebakken hovedgård and Fantoft Care Centre are located in the area, which includes apartment blocks and small houses. Fantoft is part of Fana prosti in The Church of Norway. Bybanen i Bergen has three stations in the area (Fantoft, Slettebakken and Sletten).

== Gallery ==
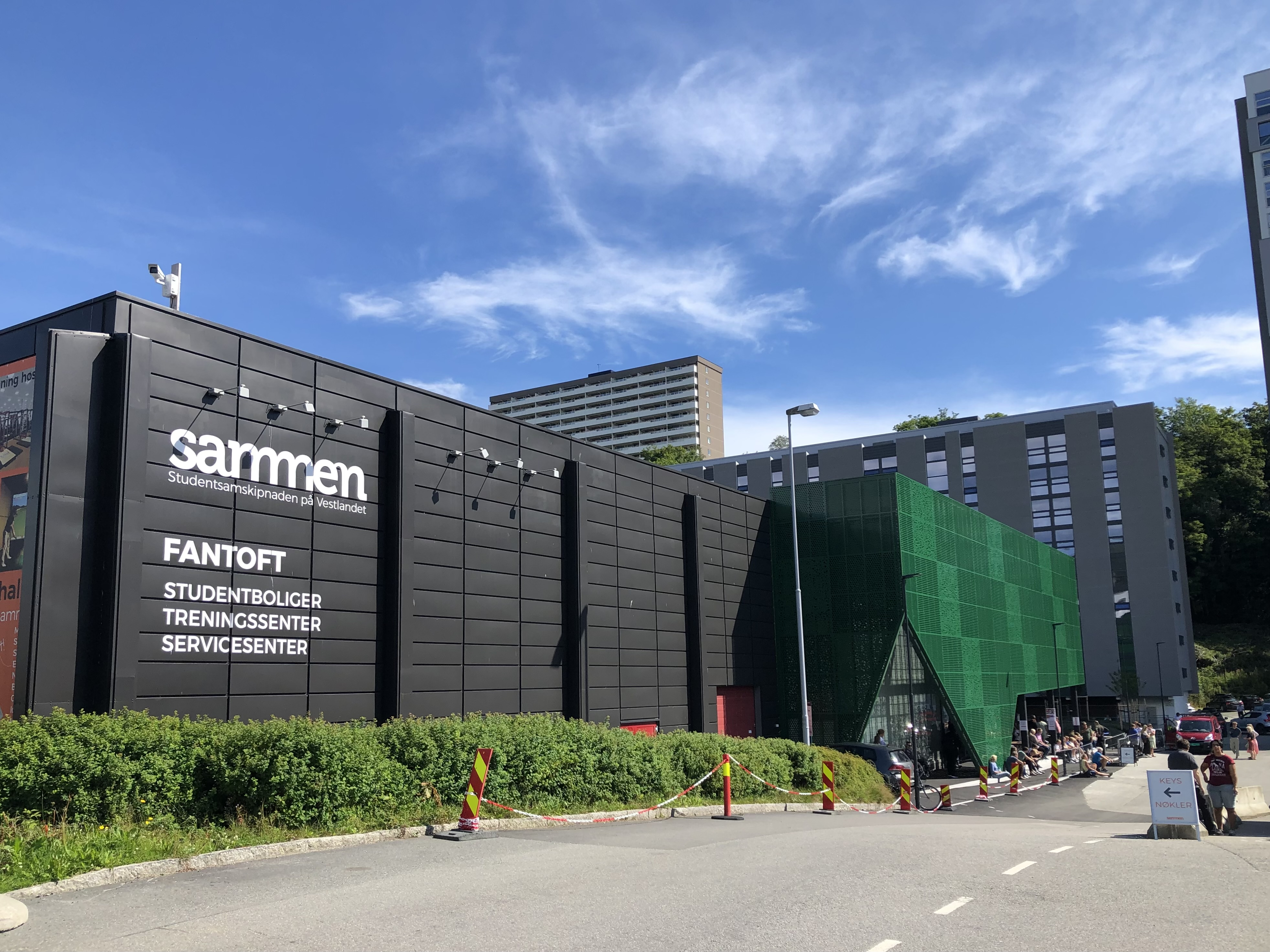
Buildings for especially students

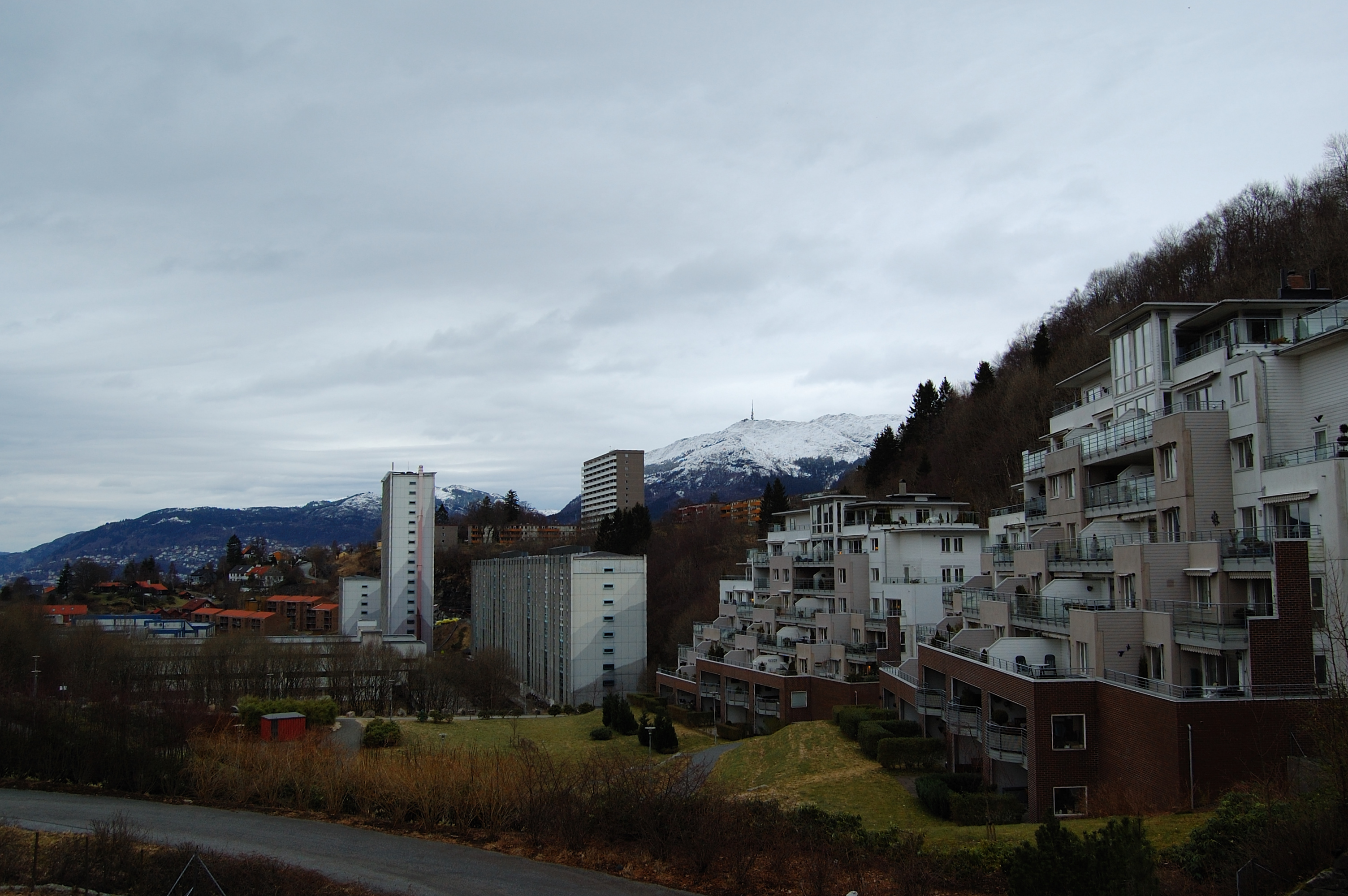
Fantoft student hostel (left) and an apartment building (right), 2009

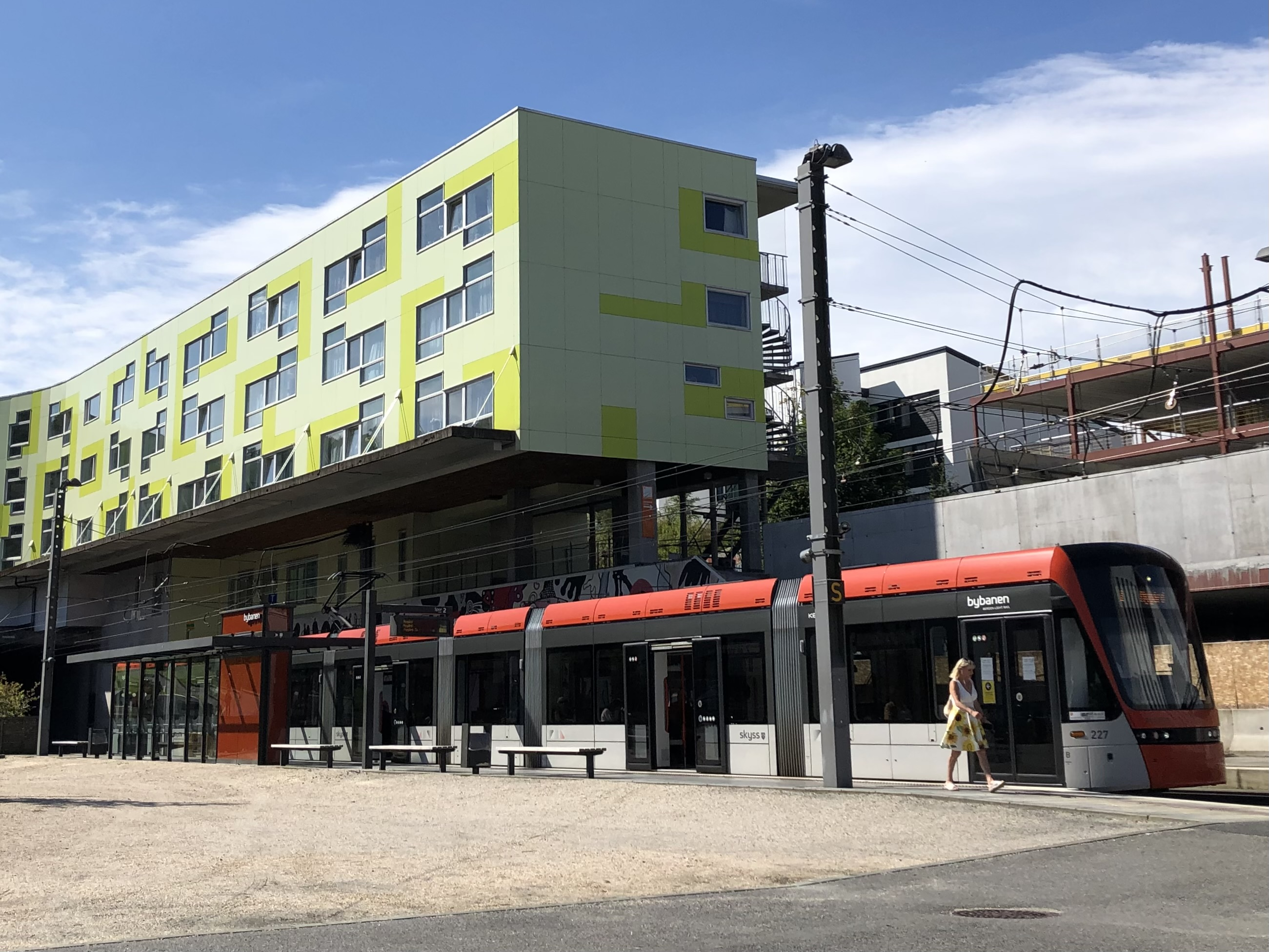
Fantoft Station (Bybanen)

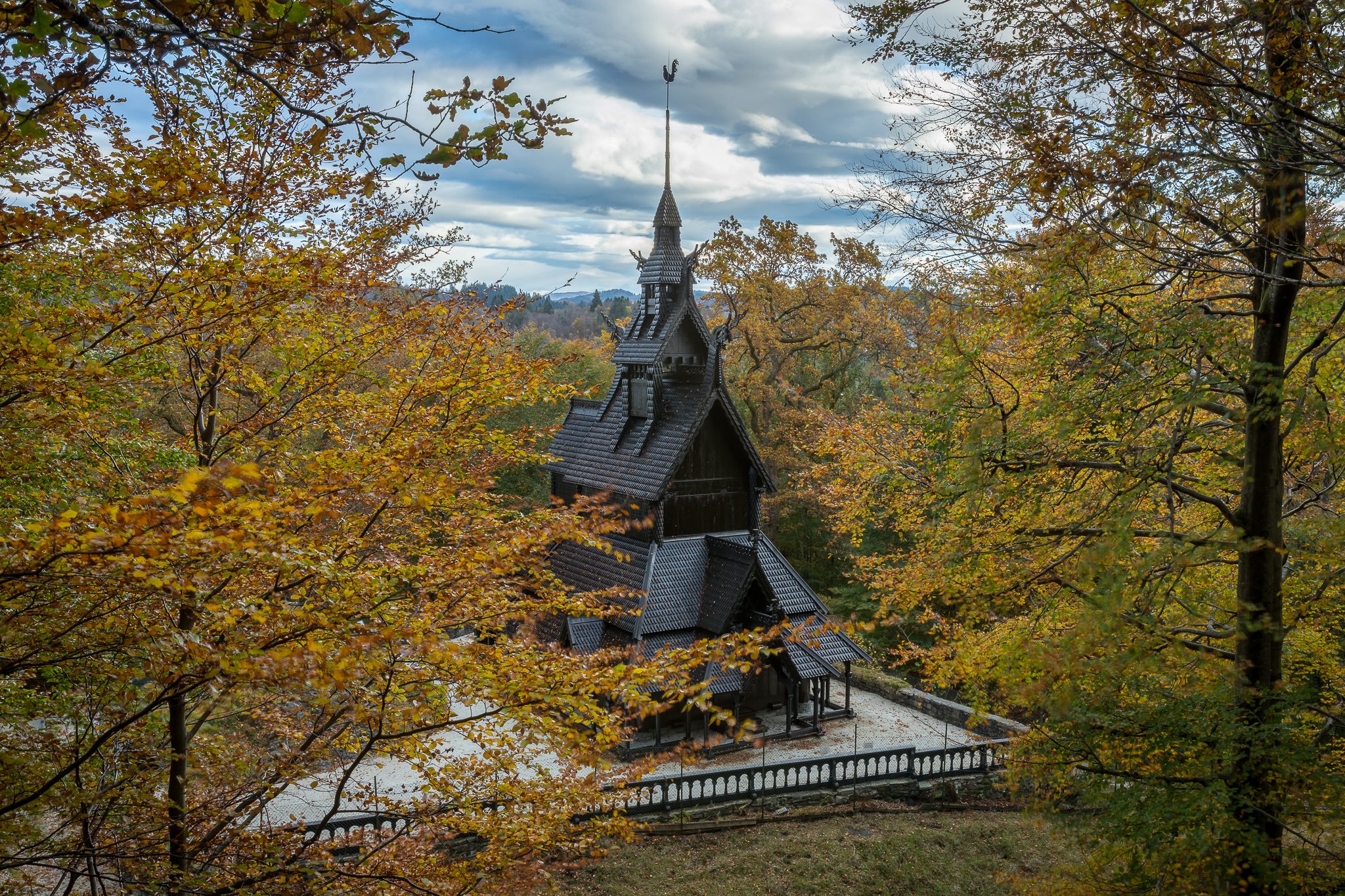
Fantoft Stave Church
