= Gothenburg City Gate =

Office skyscraper in Gothenburg, Sweden

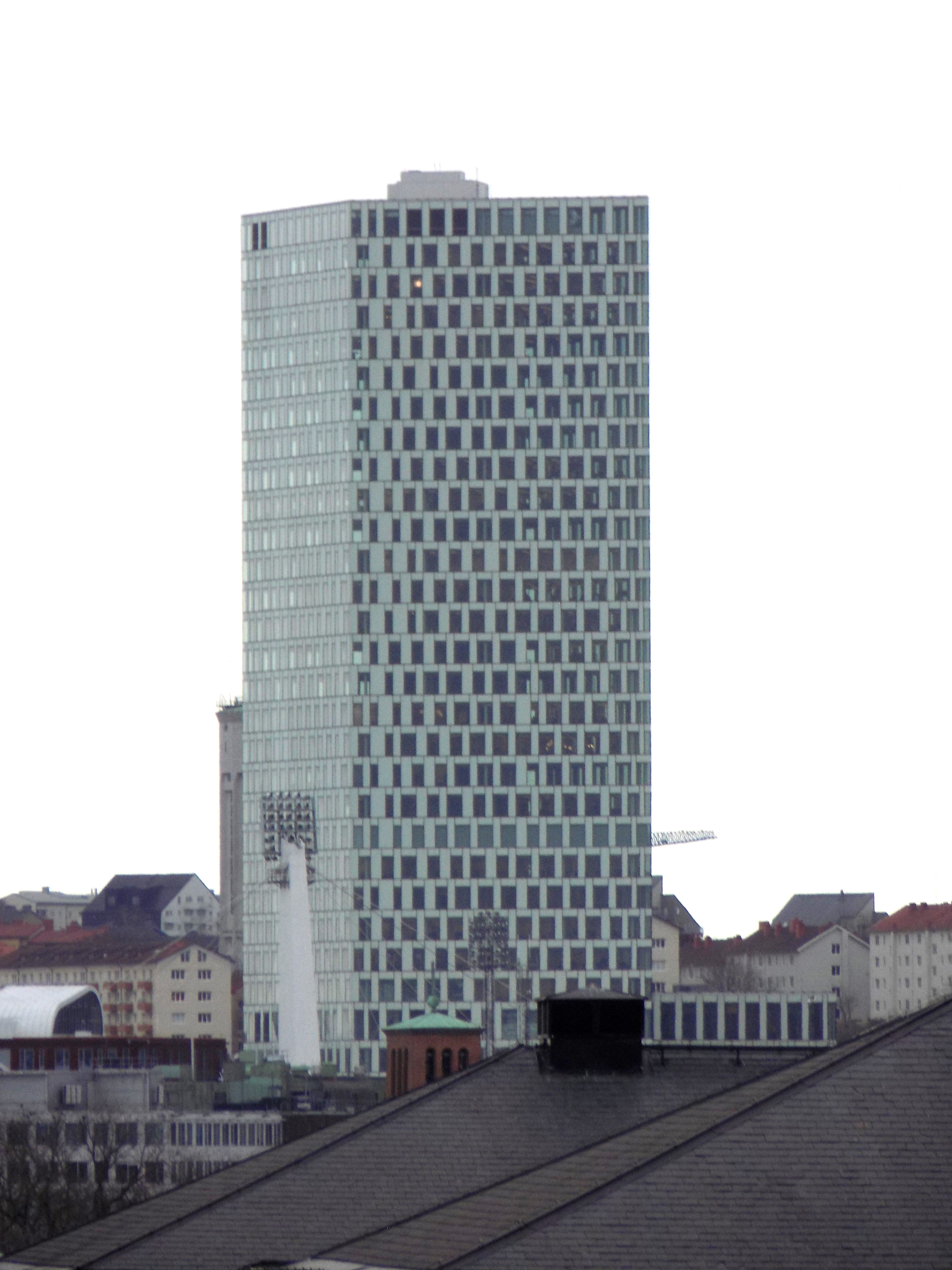
- Interactive map of the Gothenburg City Gate area

General information
- Type: Office
- Location: Fabriksgatan 2, Gothenburg, Sweden
- Coordinates: 57.70656°N 11.99282°E
- Construction started: 2019
- Completed: 2022

Height
- Roof: 144 m (472 ft)

Technical details
- Floor count: 36
- Floor area: 42,000 m^{2} (452,000 sq ft)

Design and construction
- Architect: Henning Larsen Architects
- Structural engineer: VBK Konsulterande Ingenjörer
- Main contractor: Skanska

The Gothenburg City Gate is an office skyscraper in the Gårda District of Gothenburg, Sweden. Built between 2019 and 2022, the tower stands at 144 m (472 ft) tall with 36 floors and is the third tallest building in Sweden as well as the tallest office building in Scandinavia.

== History ==
It was completed in 2022 and became the tallest office building in the Nordic region with 36 floors standing at 144 meters tall. In addition to office space, there is a restaurant, café, co-working spaces, gym, bicycle hotel and garage. The architectural offices are the Danish firm Henning Larsen Architects and Kanozi Arkitekter.

The tower was built on the plot of a former gas station. Its position within Gothenburg gave it the namesake of a city gate, guiding circulation of the E6 and E20 highways entering the town. It is also certified according to WELL and environmentally certified according to LEED.

The building is located in the Gårda business district and was designed as a hub for activity and visual anchor for a fast-developing neighbourhood embedded part of the city. The plaza from the building's ground level was designed as a shield against the harsh wind conditions in the cold months.

== Construction site ==
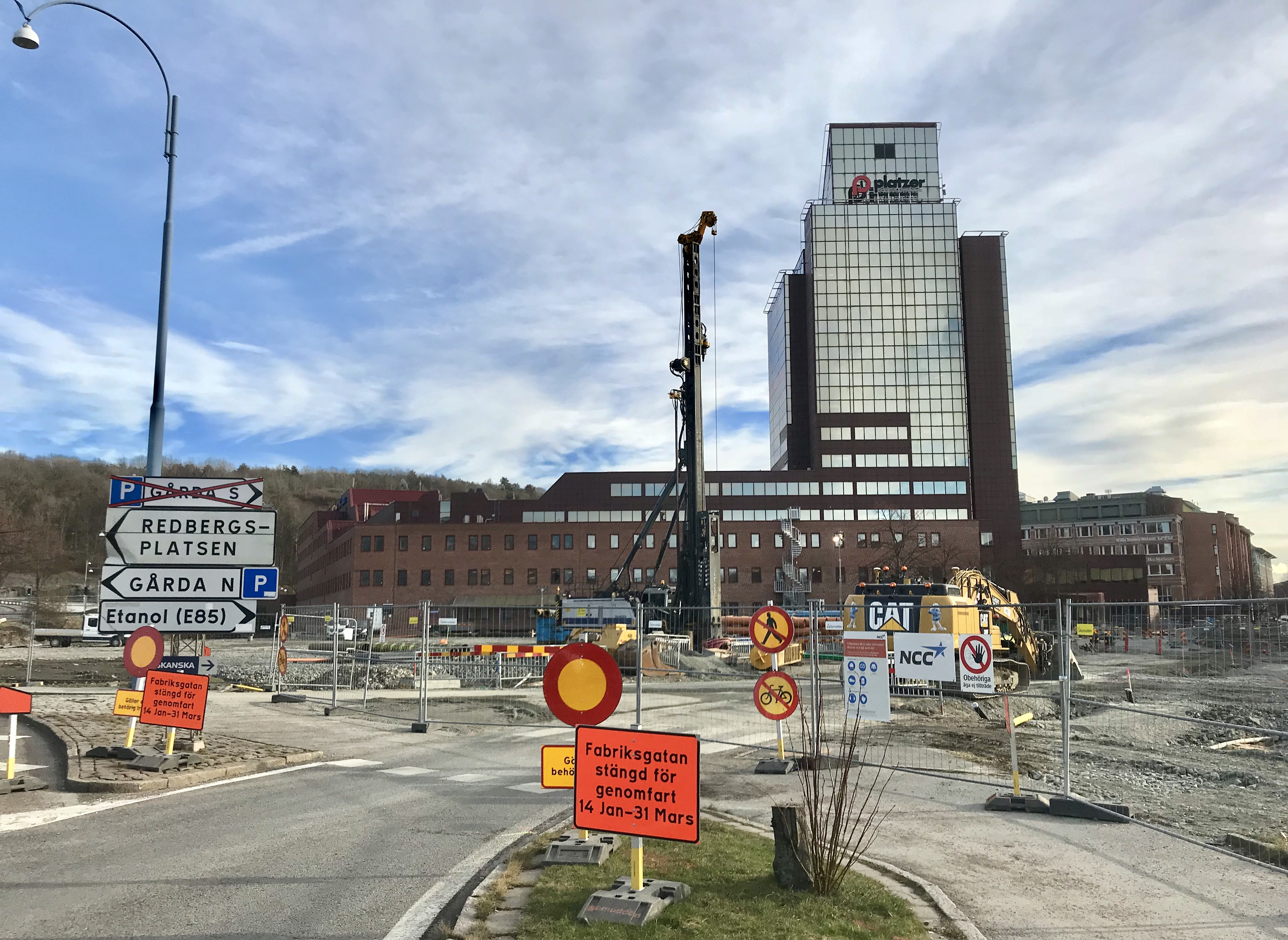
March 2019

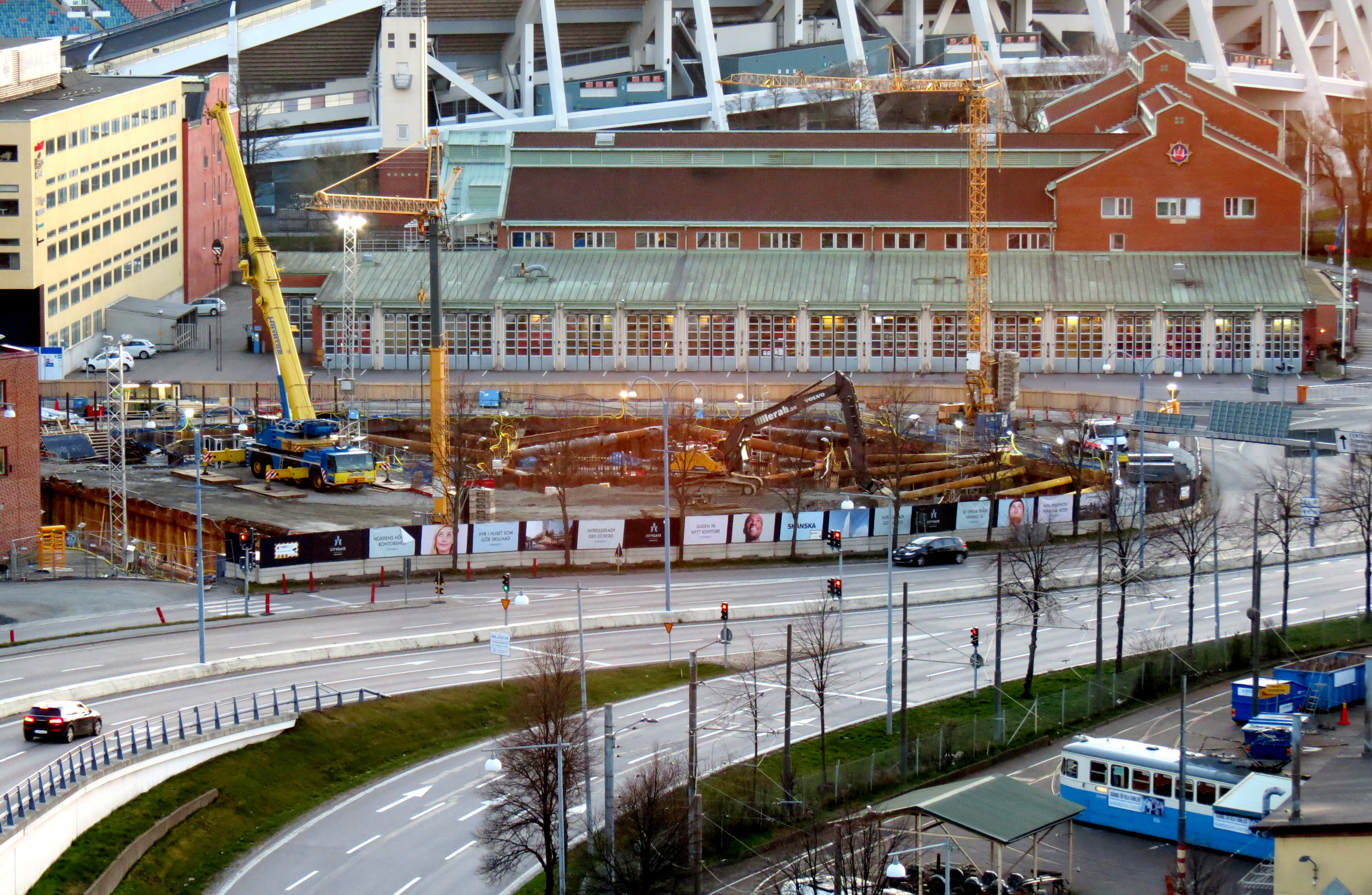
April 2020

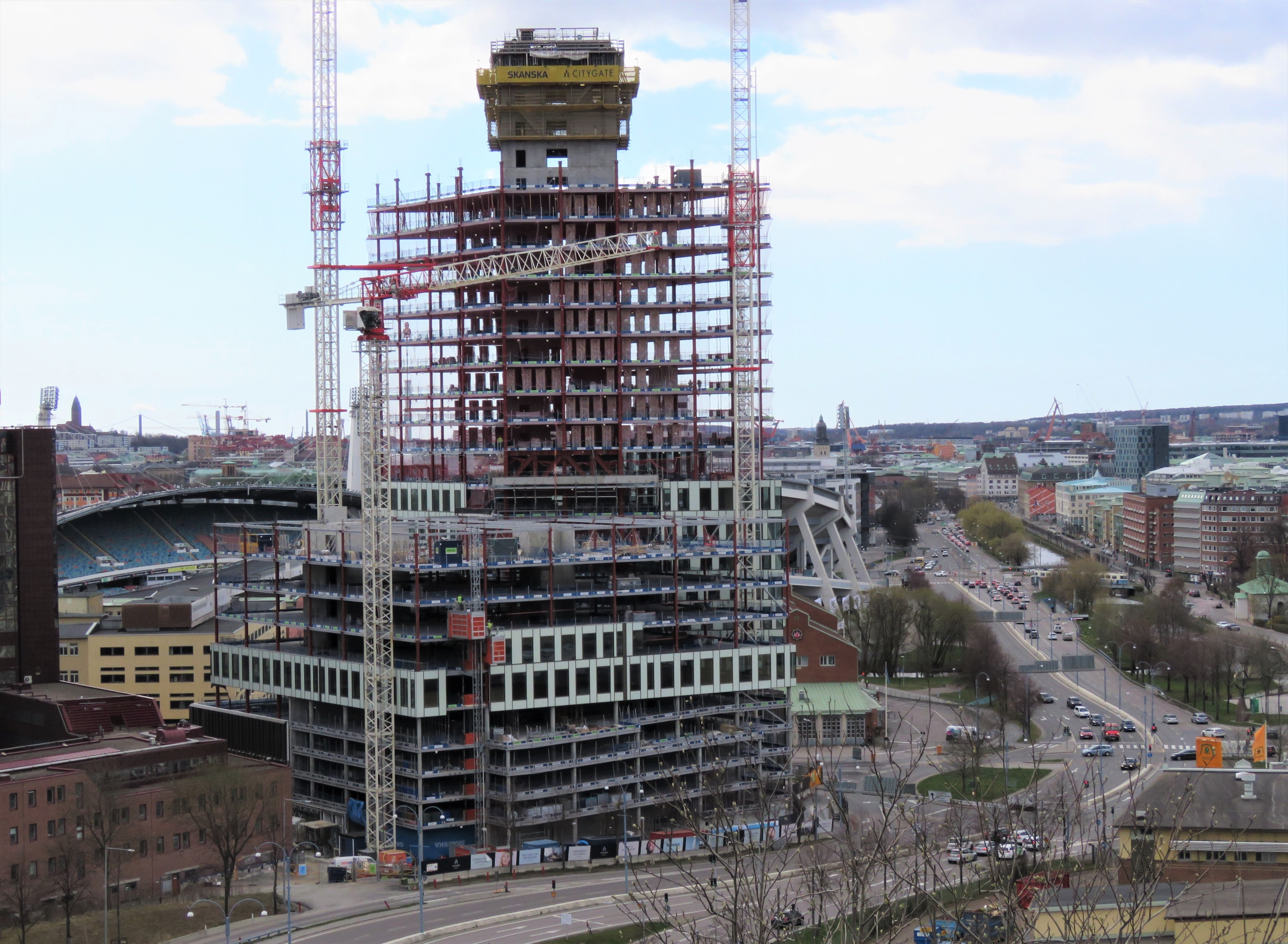
April 2021

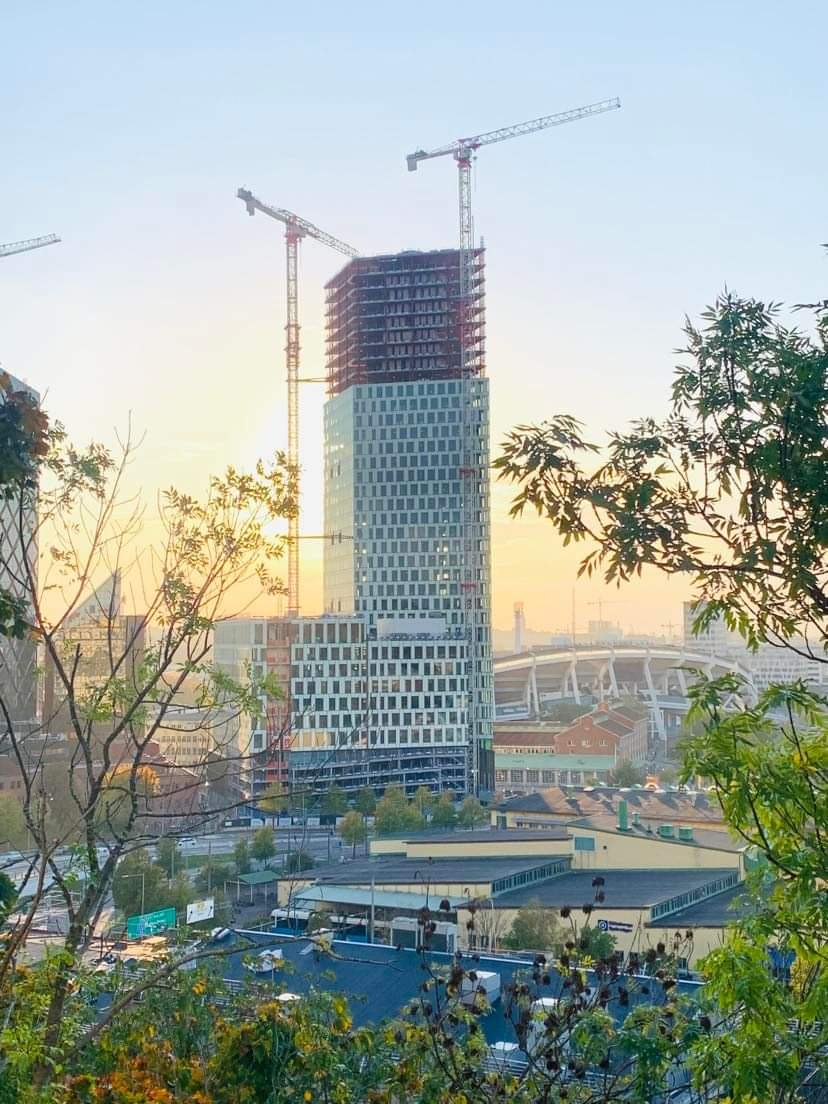
October 2021

== See also ==
- List of tallest buildings in Sweden
- List of tallest buildings in Scandinavia
