= Slettebakken Church =

Church in Vestland, Norway

- Slettebakken kirke
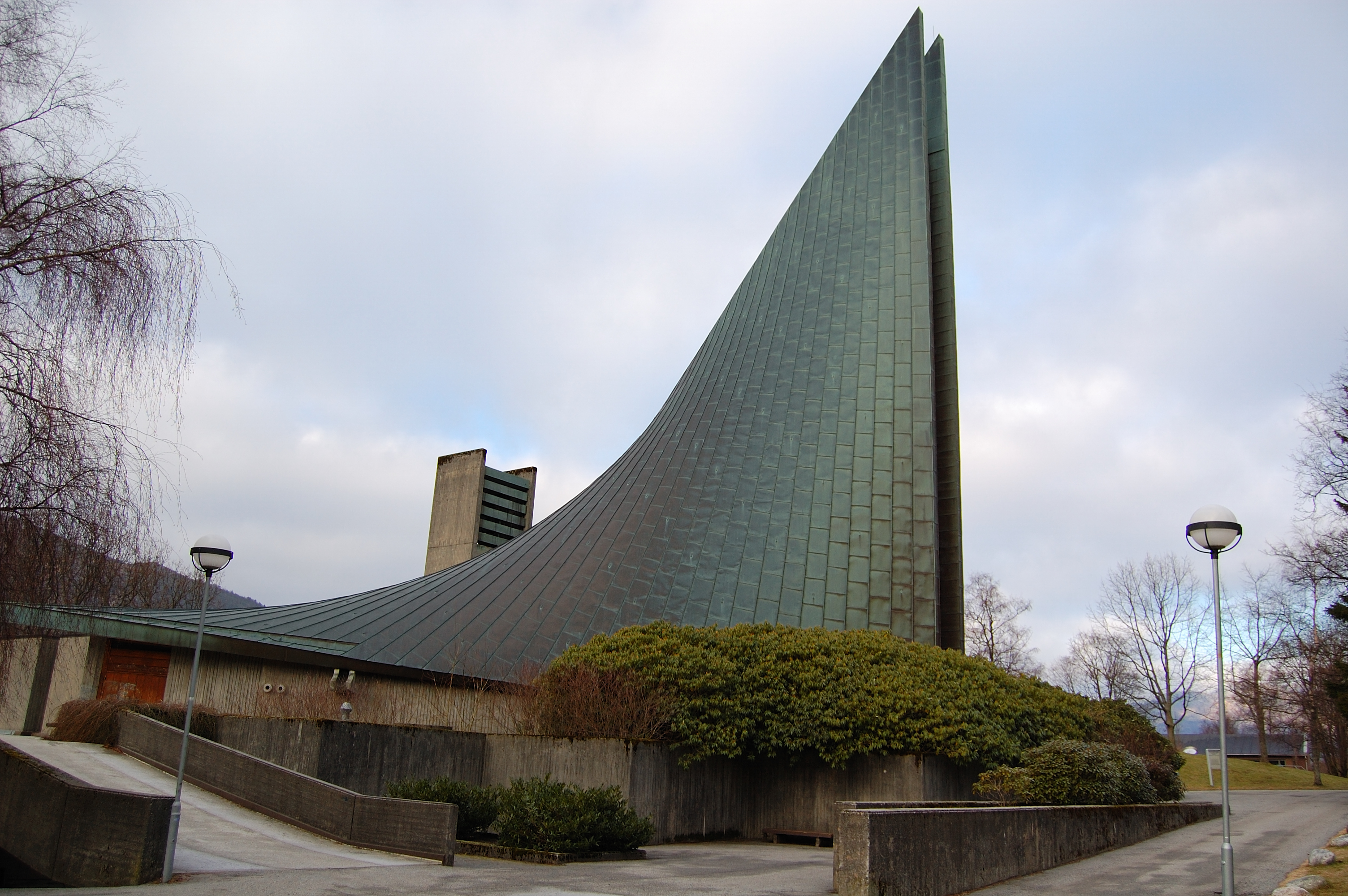
- View of the church
- Slettebakken Church
- 60°21′10″N 5°21′25″E
- Location: Bergen, Vestland
- Country: Norway
- Denomination: Church of Norway
- Churchmanship: Evangelical Lutheran

History
- Status: Parish church
- Founded: 1970
- Consecrated: 20 Dec 1970

Architecture
- Functional status: Active
- Architect: Tore Sveram
- Architectural type: Fan-shaped
- Completed: 1970 (56 years ago)

Specifications
- Capacity: 600
- Materials: Concrete

Administration
- Diocese: Bjørgvin bispedømme
- Deanery: Bergensdalen prosti
- Parish: Slettebakken
- Norwegian Cultural Heritage Site
- Type: Church
- Status: Protected
- ID: 85497

Slettebakken Church (Norwegian: Slettebakken kirke) is a parish church of the Church of Norway in Bergen Municipality in Vestland county, Norway. It is located in the Slettebakken neighborhood in Årstad borough in the city of Bergen. It is the church for the Slettebakken parish which is part of the Bergensdalen prosti (deanery) in the Diocese of Bjørgvin. The large, concrete church was built in a modern fan-shaped design in 1970 using plans drawn up by the architect Tore Sveram. The church seats about 600 people.

== History ==
The new parish of Slettebakken was established in 1959. During the 1960s, planning began for a new church for this parish. An architectural competition was held to find the architect for the church. It was won by Tore Sveram. The church was designed with a modern look and a unique, curved roof line that would make the church a landmark within the city. The foundation stone was laid in 1968 and it was consecrated on 20 December 1970. An organ from the J. H. Jørgensen Organ Company with 16 voices was installed in the church.

== Media gallery ==
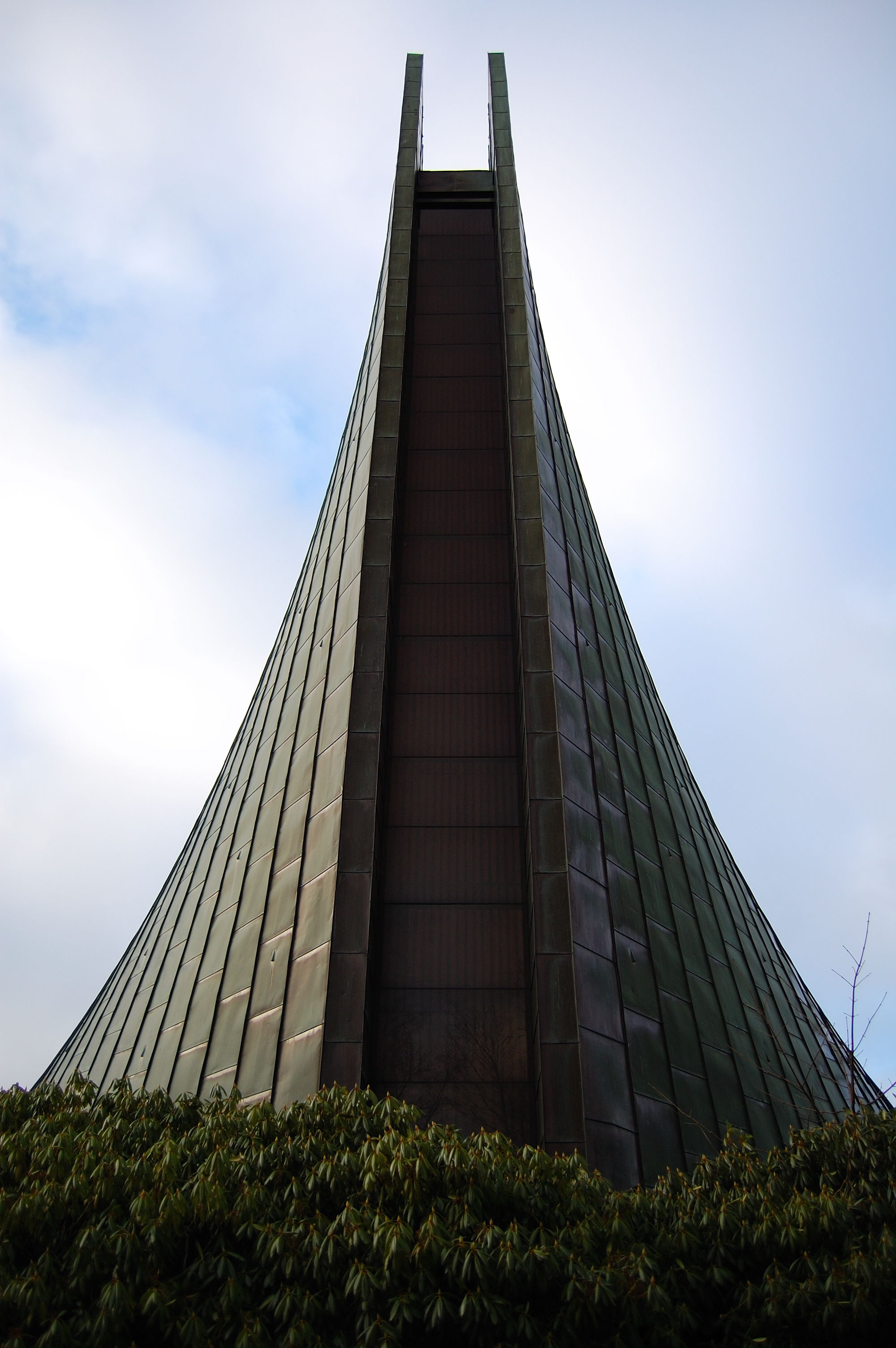

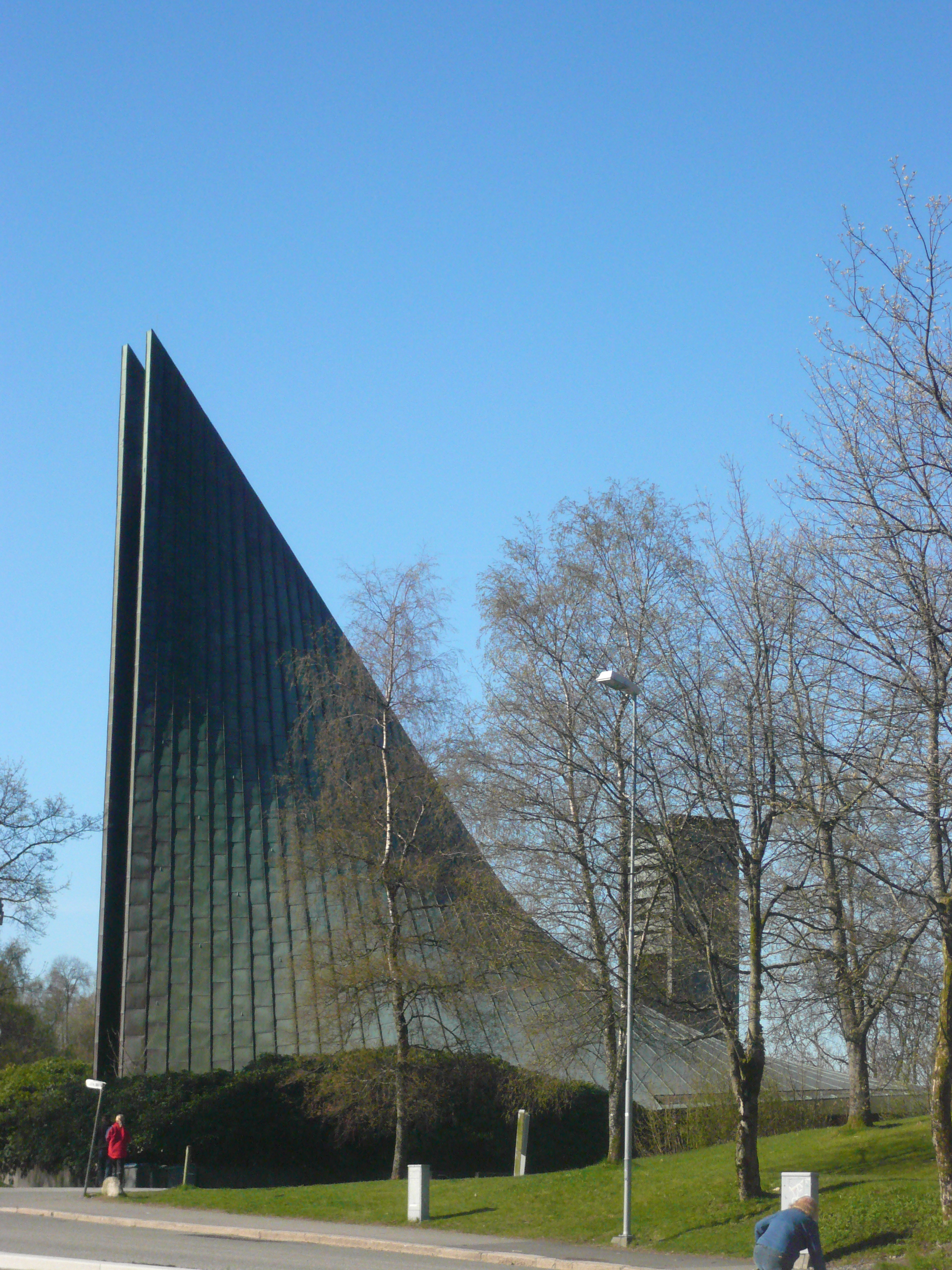

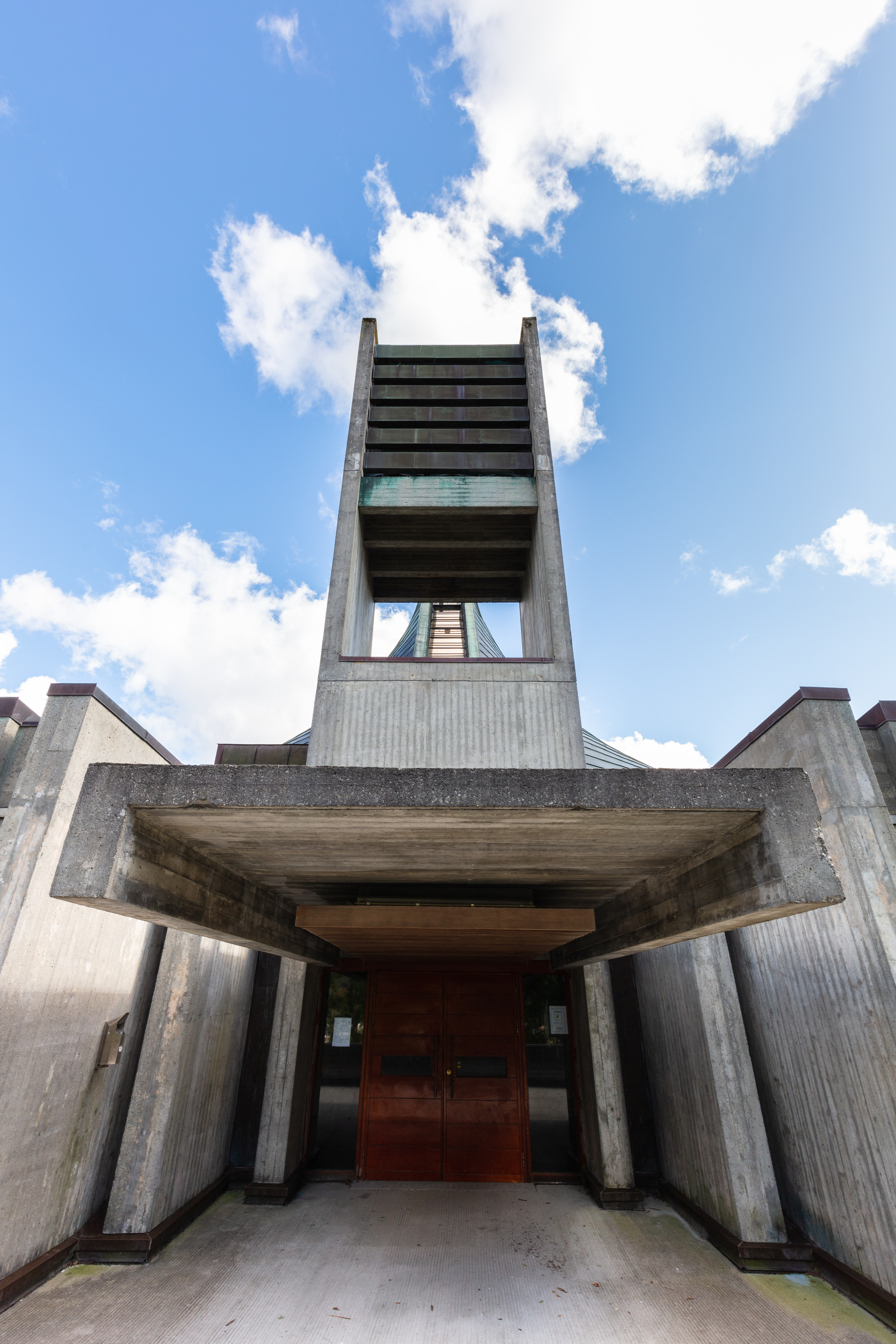

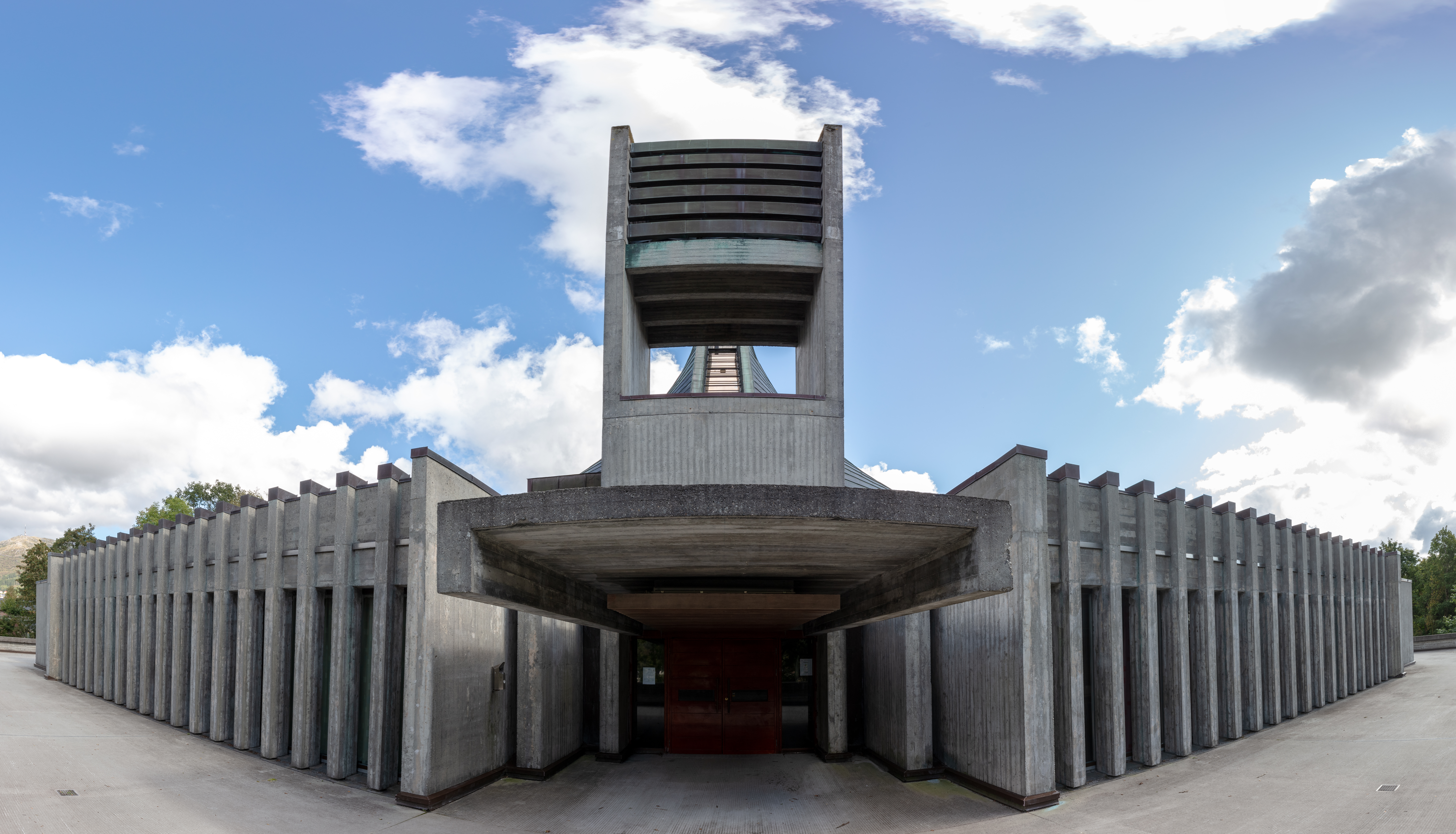

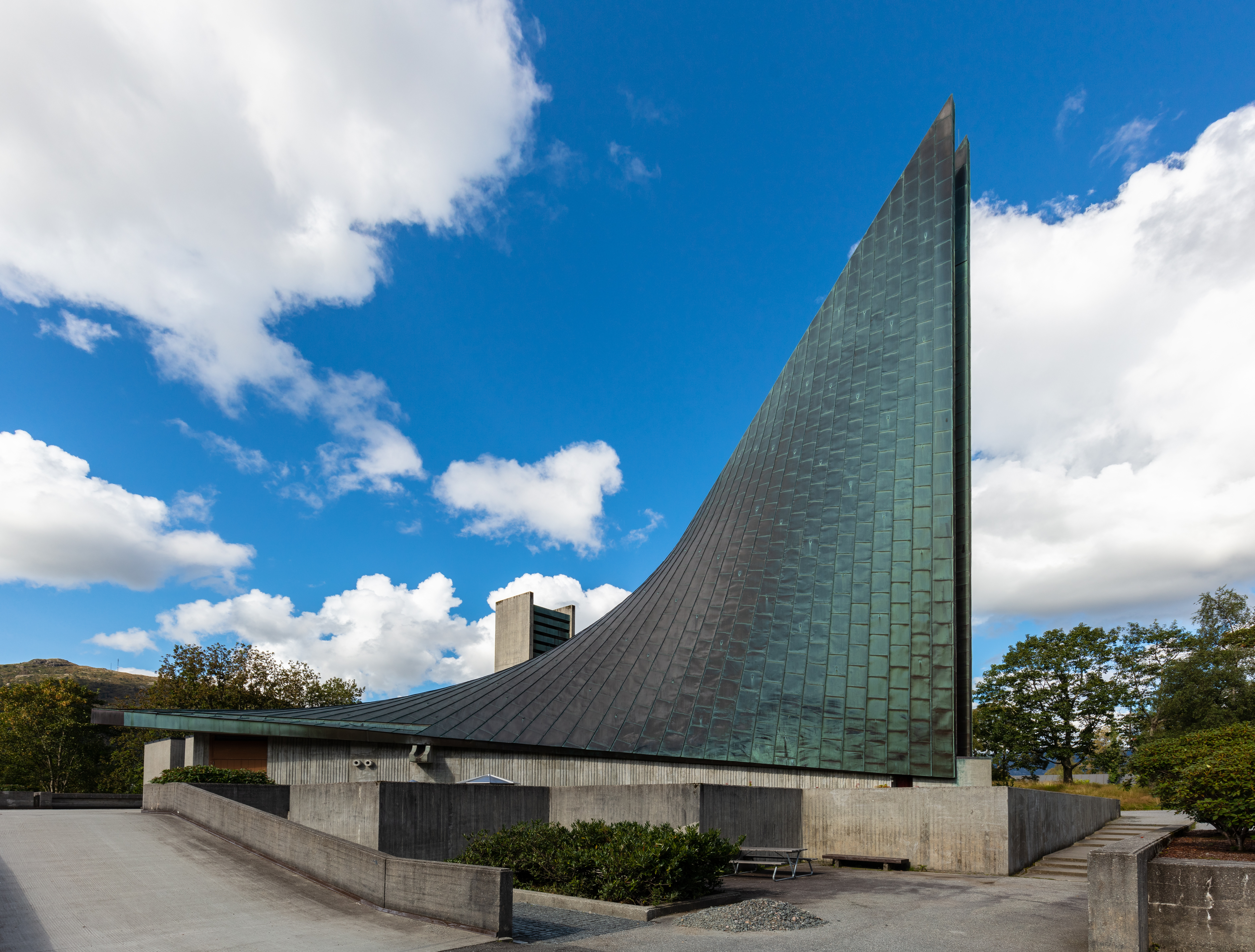

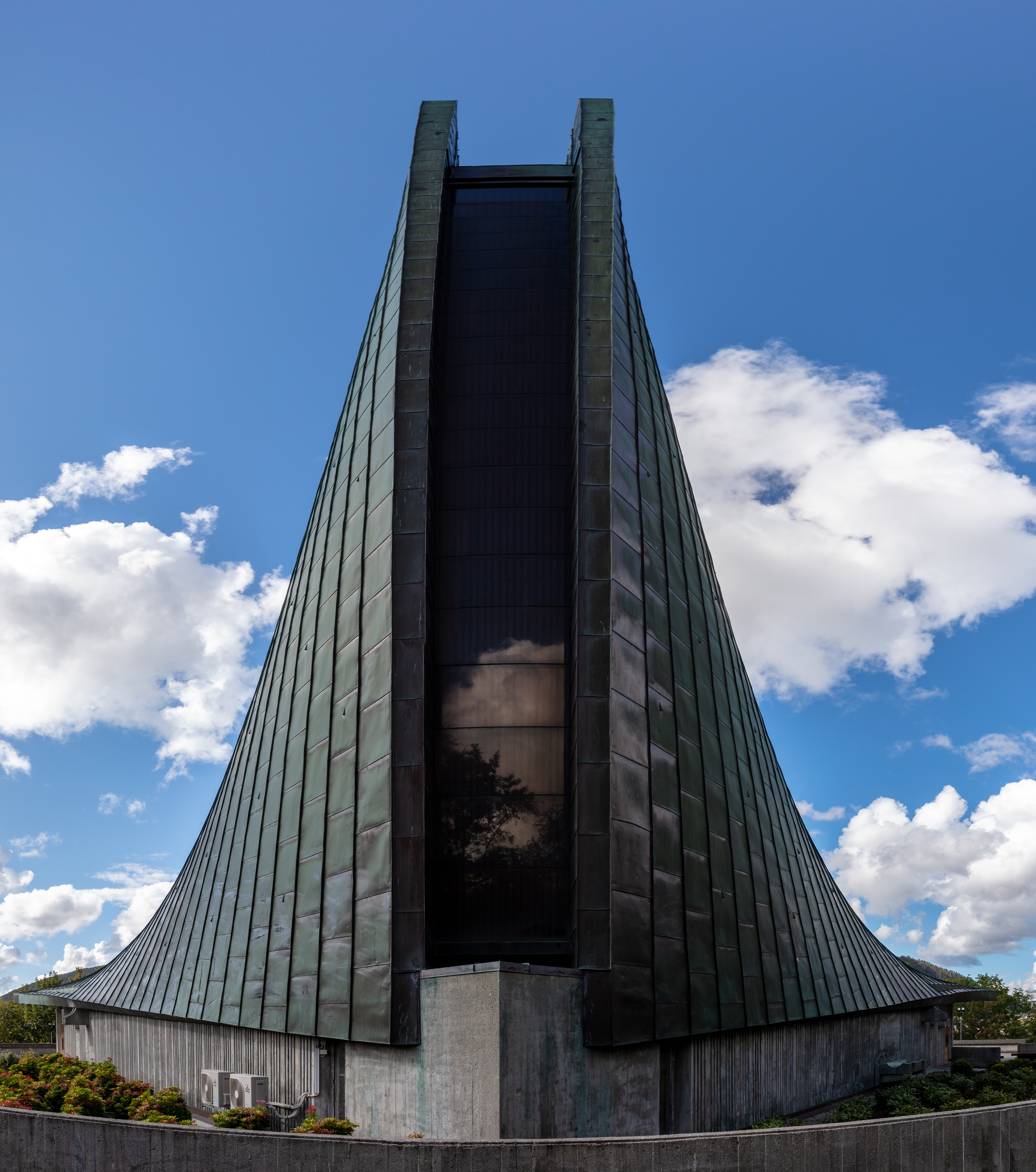

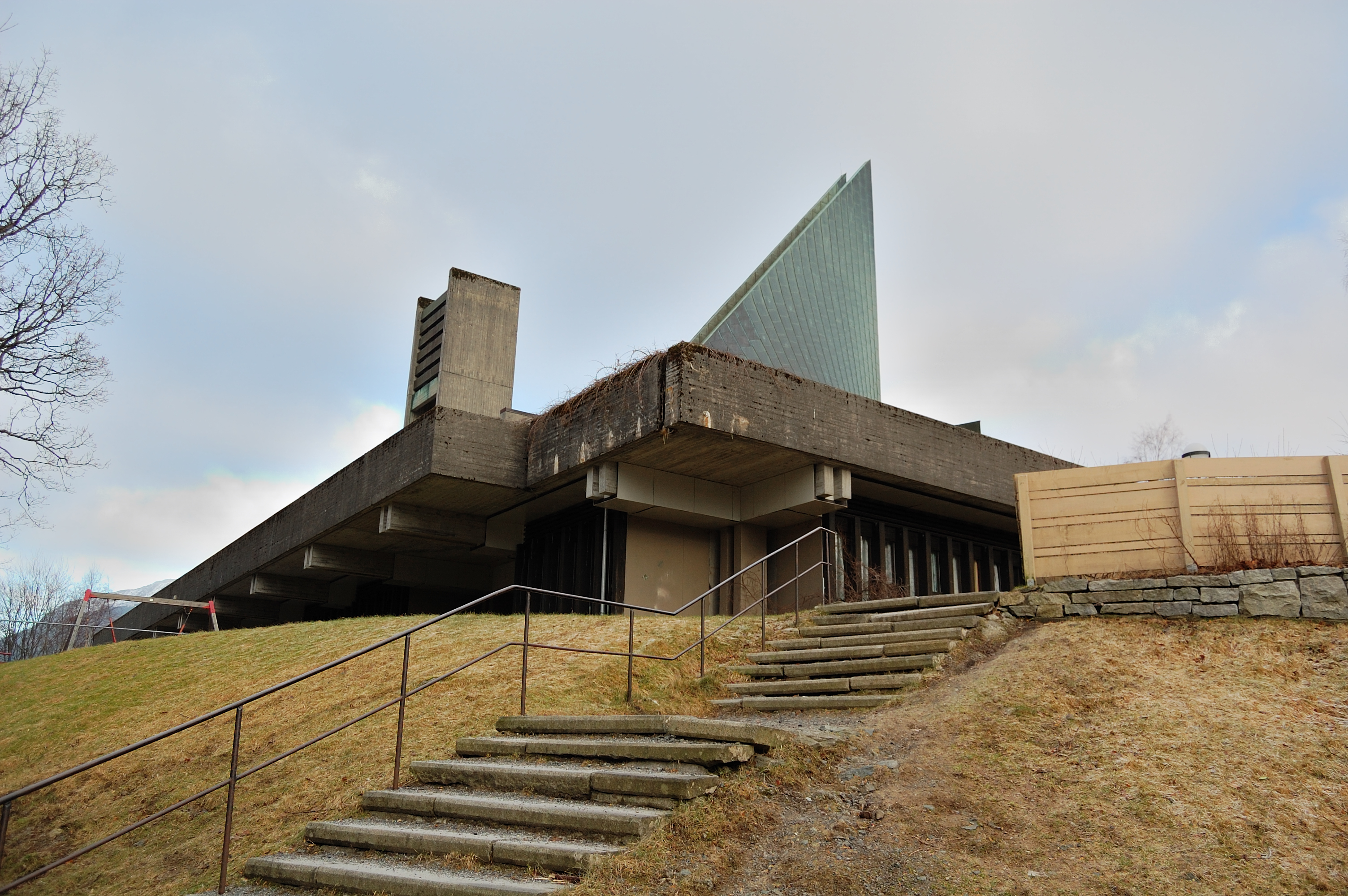

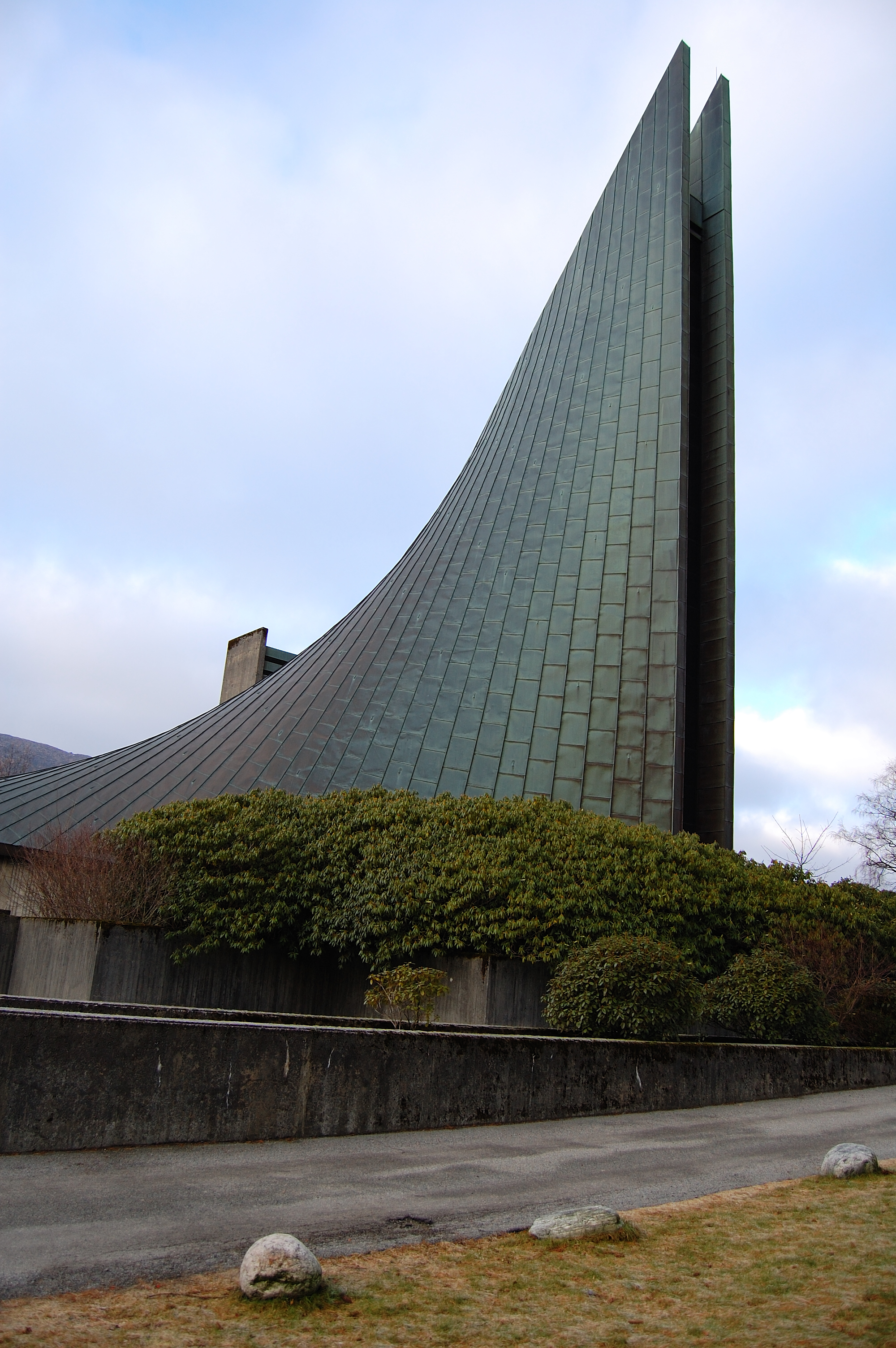

== See also ==
- List of churches in Bjørgvin
