= Radisson Blu Plaza Hotel, Oslo =

Building in Norway

- Oslo Plaza
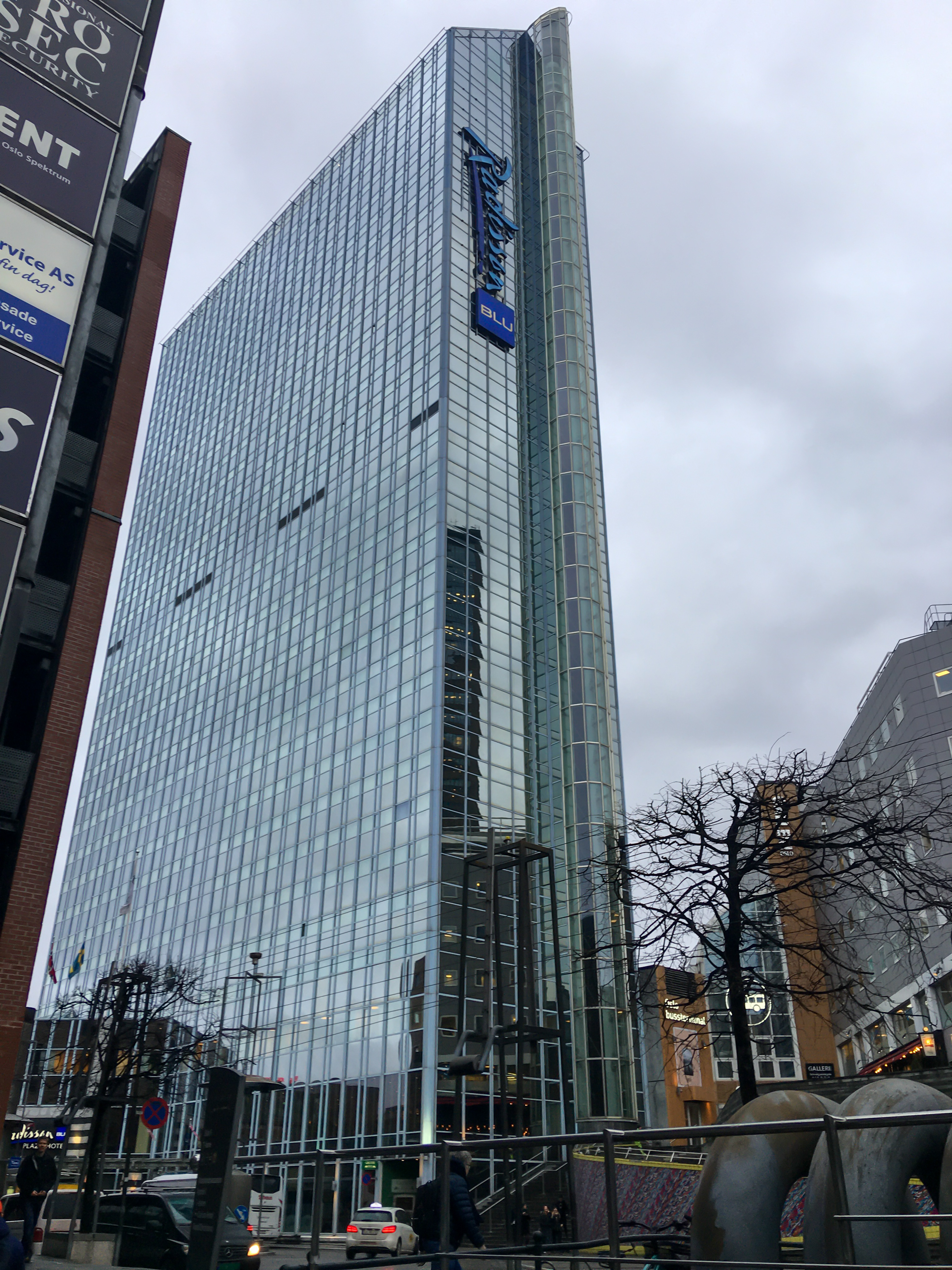
- Hotel chain: Radisson Blu; Radisson SAS (former)

General information
- Location: Sonja Henies plass 3, 0185 Oslo, Norway
- Coordinates: 59°54′44.1″N 10°45′18.9″E
- Completed: 1989
- Opened: 14 March 1990
- Renovated: 2012
- Affiliation: Radisson Hotel Group; Rezidor Hotel Group (former)

Height
- Height: 117 metres (384 ft)

Technical details
- Floor count: 37
- Lifts/elevators: 10

Design and construction
- Architecture firm: White Arkitekter

Other information
- Number of rooms: 678
- Number of suites: 20
- Number of restaurants: 3
- Number of bars: 3
- Facilities: Swimming pool, sauna, gym
- Parking: Valet parking

Website
- www.radissonblu.com/en/plazahotel-oslo

Radisson Blu Plaza Hotel, Oslo, formerly Radisson SAS Plaza Hotel, Oslo, known locally as Oslo Plaza, is situated in Oslo city centre. At 117 metres (384 ft) tall, it is Norway's third tallest building and the tallest building in Oslo.

== History ==
The building was designed by the architectural firm White Arkitekter and completed in 1989. The hotel was officially opened on 14 March 1990, by King Olav V of Norway. In 1992, a footbridge was built between the hotel and the Oslo Spektrum arena. The footbridge has since been removed as part of the renovation works of Oslo Spektrum in June 2025. The hotel was remodelled in 2012.

=== Jennifer Fairgate ===
The hotel is known for the death of an unidentified woman in room 2805 on June 3, 1995. She had checked in as "Jennifer Fairgate", misspelling the surname as "Fergate". A man named "Lois Fairgate" was listed with her, but his identity remains unknown. She gave a false address in Verlaine, Belgium, and her death was ruled a suicide by a 9mm pistol. However, there was no blood or residue on her hand, no ID was found, and all clothing tags had been removed, leading to speculation that she was a covert operative. The case was featured in Netflix's Unsolved Mysteries in October 2020.

== Facilities ==
The hotel has 37 floors and 678 rooms. There are a total of 1,500 beds, 140 business rooms and 20 suites, including the King Suite and Polar Suite on the thirty-second floor and the Reder Suite on the thirty-first floor. The tower's foundations are concrete, and it has reflective glass façades. The uppermost floors are tapered with a skillion - a steep diagonal roof on one side, leading to a sharp ridge. It also has an external glass elevator, which travels up to the bar/restaurant at the top.

A lower block, three floors tall, contains the entrance, a lobby, a bar, a restaurant, the breakfast dining room and conference rooms. The largest conference room is the 858m^{2} Sonja Henie Ballroom, capable of holding 1,000 guests and has a stage area.

The Top, encompassing the thirty-third and thirty-fourth floor, consisting of a fine-dining restaurant and bar on the thirty-fourth floor and the Terrace, a more traditional restaurant on the thirty-fifth floor with a view of the Oslofjord. This can be accessed by the public from a glass elevator which travels up the side of the building. At ground level, there is Chicago Pizza & Brew (previously Galway Bay bar), accessible from both inside and outside the hotel which serves as a pizza bar.

Guest facilities include a sauna and a swimming pool are found on the thirty-fourth and thirty-fifth floors respectively (the top of the building). There is also a gym with fitness equipment on the thirty-seventh floor right in the tapered roof of the building. A baggage storage service and concierge are available in the lobby area for guests.

== In popular culture ==
- The hotel is featured in the NRK TV program "Våre beste år" (Our Best Years) in the season 2, episode 7 named "Fersken på boks og Oslo Plaza" (Cannned Peaches and Oslo Plaza). The external signage was removed as it is set in the 1980's, however, the interior retains the renovated layout. Filming took place in the reception and staircase, the Sonja Henie Ballroom, floor seventeen and thirty-one, including the Reder Suite on floor thirty-one, and the swimming pool.
- The Sonja Henie ballroom and road leading to the hotel, Sonja Henies plass, are named in honour of the Norwegian figure skater and actress Sonja Henie. There is also a statue in her honour on the second floor of the hotel.

== See also ==
- Radisson Blu Scandinavia Hotel, Oslo
- Isdal Woman, comparable case in Norway 1970
