= Ericsson =

Swedish telecommunications company

Telefonaktiebolaget LM Ericsson

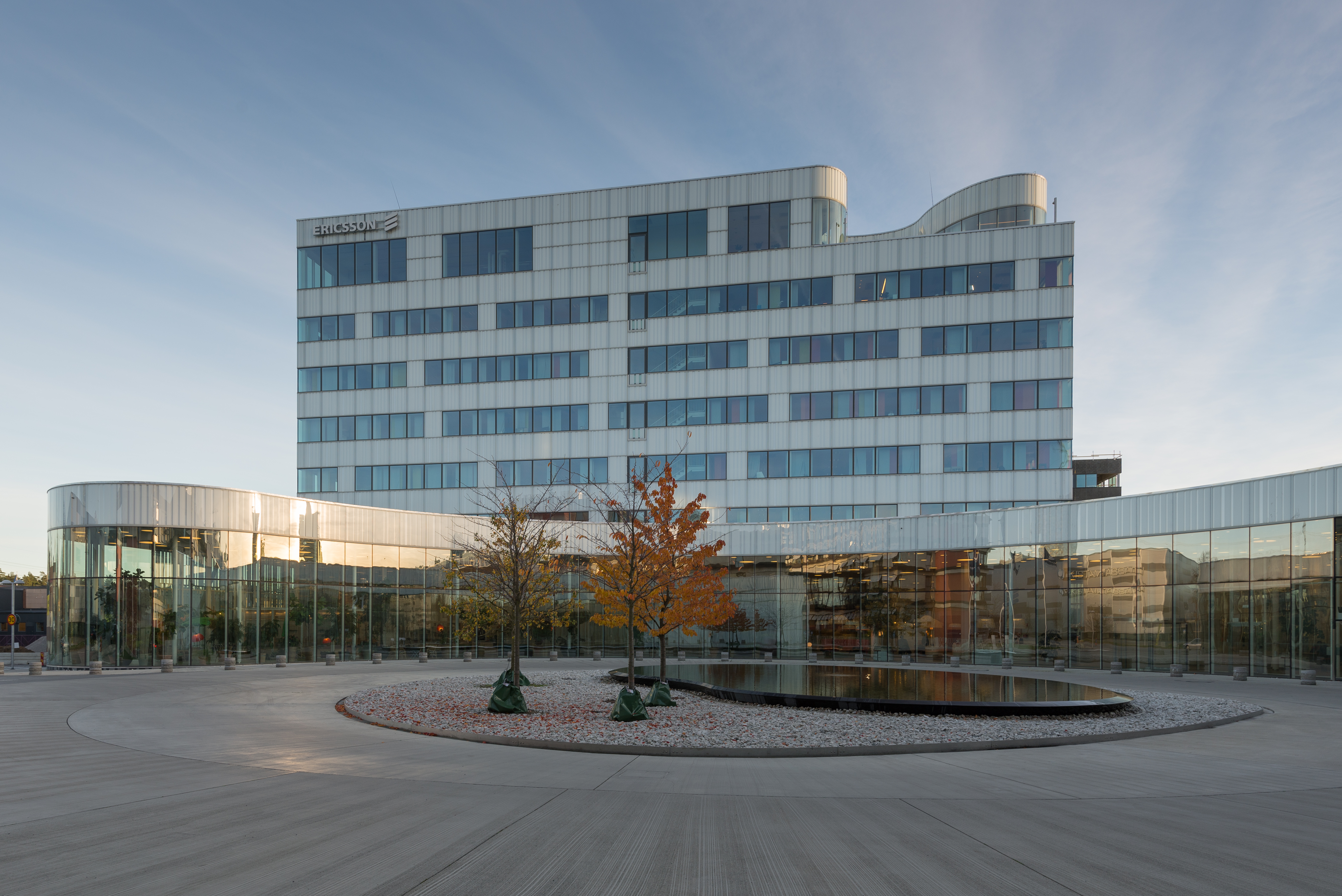
- Ericsson's headquarters in Kista, Stockholm
- Type: Public
- Traded as: Nasdaq Stockholm: ERIC A; ERIC B; Nasdaq: ERIC; OMXS30 component
- ISIN: SE0000108649; SE0000108656
- Industry: Telecommunications
- Founded: Stockholm, Sweden (1876; 150 years ago)
- Founder: Lars Magnus Ericsson
- Headquarters: Kista, Stockholm, Sweden
- Area served: Worldwide
- Key people: Jan Carlson (chairman); Per Narvinger (president & CEO)
- Products: Mobile and fixed broadband networks, consultancy and managed services, TV and multimedia technology
- Revenue: ▼236.7 billion kr (2025)
- Operating income: ▲38.634 billion kr (2025)
- Net income: ▲28.7 billion kr (2025)
- Total assets: ▼279.223 billion kr (2025)
- Total equity: ▲110.264 billion kr (2025)
- Owners: Investor AB (9.92%; 24.82% votes); AB Industrivärden (2.58%; 15.04% votes); AMF Tjänstepension & AMF Fonder (3.20%; 5.13% votes)
- Number of employees: ▼89,000 (2025)
- Subsidiaries: Cradlepoint; inCode Consulting; Red Bee Media; Vonage
- Website: ericsson.com

Telefonaktiebolaget LM Ericsson (lit. 'Telephone Stock Company of LM Ericsson'), commonly known as Ericsson (Swedish pronunciation: [ˈêːrɪkˌsɔn]), is a Swedish multinational networking and telecommunications company headquartered in Stockholm. Ericsson has been a major contributor to the development of the telecommunications industry and is one of the leaders in 5G. Ericsson has over 57,000 granted patents, and it is the inventor of Bluetooth technology.

The company sells infrastructure, software, and services in information and communications technology for telecommunications service providers and enterprises, including, among others, cellular 4G and 5G equipment, and Internet Protocol (IP) and optical transport systems. The company employs around 100,000 people and operates in more than 180 countries. The company is listed on the Nasdaq Stockholm under the ticker symbols ERIC.A and ERIC.B and on the American Nasdaq under the ticker symbol ERIC.

The company was founded in 1876 by Lars Magnus Ericsson and is jointly controlled by the Wallenberg family through its holding company Investor AB, and the universal bank Handelsbanken through its investment company Industrivärden. The Wallenbergs and the Handelsbanken sphere acquired its voting-strong A-shares, and thus the control of Ericsson, after the fall of the Kreuger empire in the early 1930s.

== History ==
=== Foundation ===
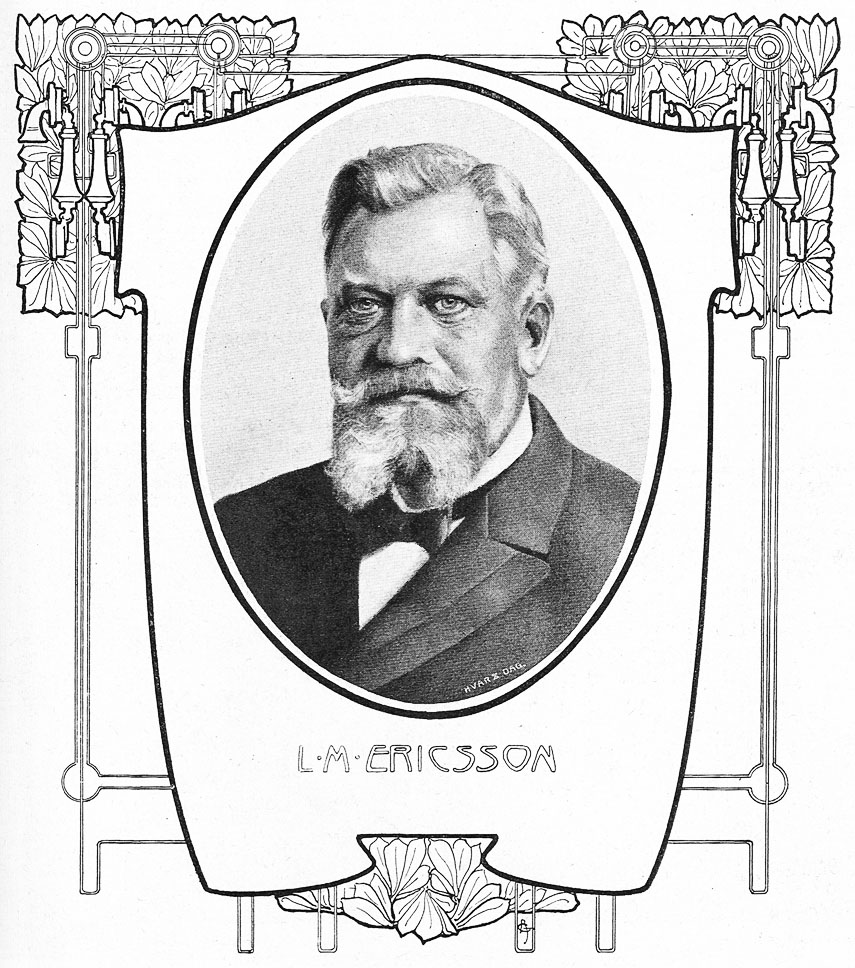
Lars Magnus Ericsson

Lars Magnus Ericsson began his association with telephones in his youth as an instrument maker. He worked for a firm that made telegraph equipment for the Swedish government agency Telegrafverket. In 1876, at the age of 30, he started a telegraph repair shop with help from his friend Carl Johan Andersson in central Stockholm and repaired foreign-made telephones. In 1878, Ericsson began making and selling his own telephone equipment. His telephones were not technically innovative. In 1878, he agreed to supply telephones and switchboards to Sweden's first telecommunications operating company, Stockholms Allmänna Telefonaktiebolag.

=== International expansion ===
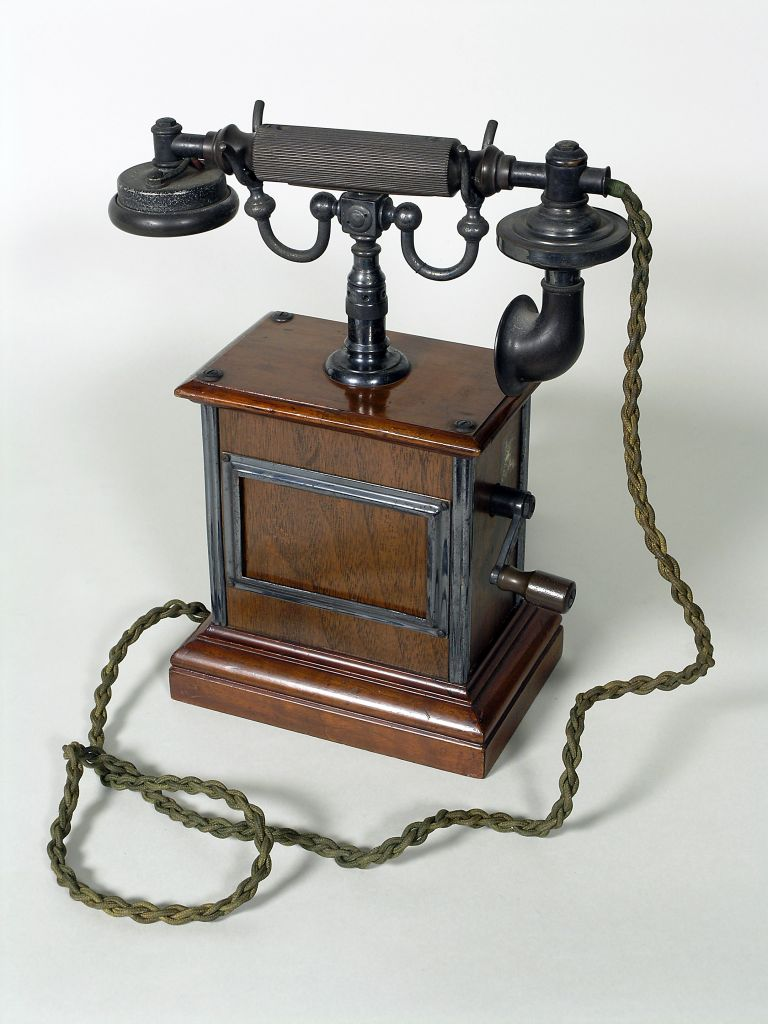
An early, wooden, Ericsson telephone, made by the Ericsson Telephone Co. Ltd., of Nottingham, England, is now in the collection of Thinktank, Birmingham Science Museum.

As production grew in the late 1890s, and the Swedish market seemed to be reaching saturation, Ericsson expanded into foreign markets through a number of agents. The UK (Ericsson Telephones Ltd.) and Russia were early markets, where factories were later established to improve the chances of gaining local contracts and augment the output of the Swedish factory. In the UK, the National Telephone Company was a major customer; by 1897 sold 28% of its output in the UK. The Nordic countries were also Ericsson customers; they were encouraged by the growth of telephone services in Sweden.

Other countries and colonies were exposed to Ericsson products through the influence of their parent countries. These included Australia and New Zealand, which by the late 1890s were Ericsson's largest non-European markets. Mass production techniques were now firmly established; telephones were losing some of their ornate finish and decoration.

Despite its successes elsewhere, Ericsson did not make significant sales in the United States. AT&T's Western Electric Company (via the Bell System), Kellogg and Automatic Electric dominated the market. Ericsson eventually sold its U.S. assets. Sales in Mexico led to inroads into South American countries. South Africa and China were also generating significant sales. With his company now multinational, Lars Ericsson stepped down from the company in 1901.

=== Automatic equipment ===
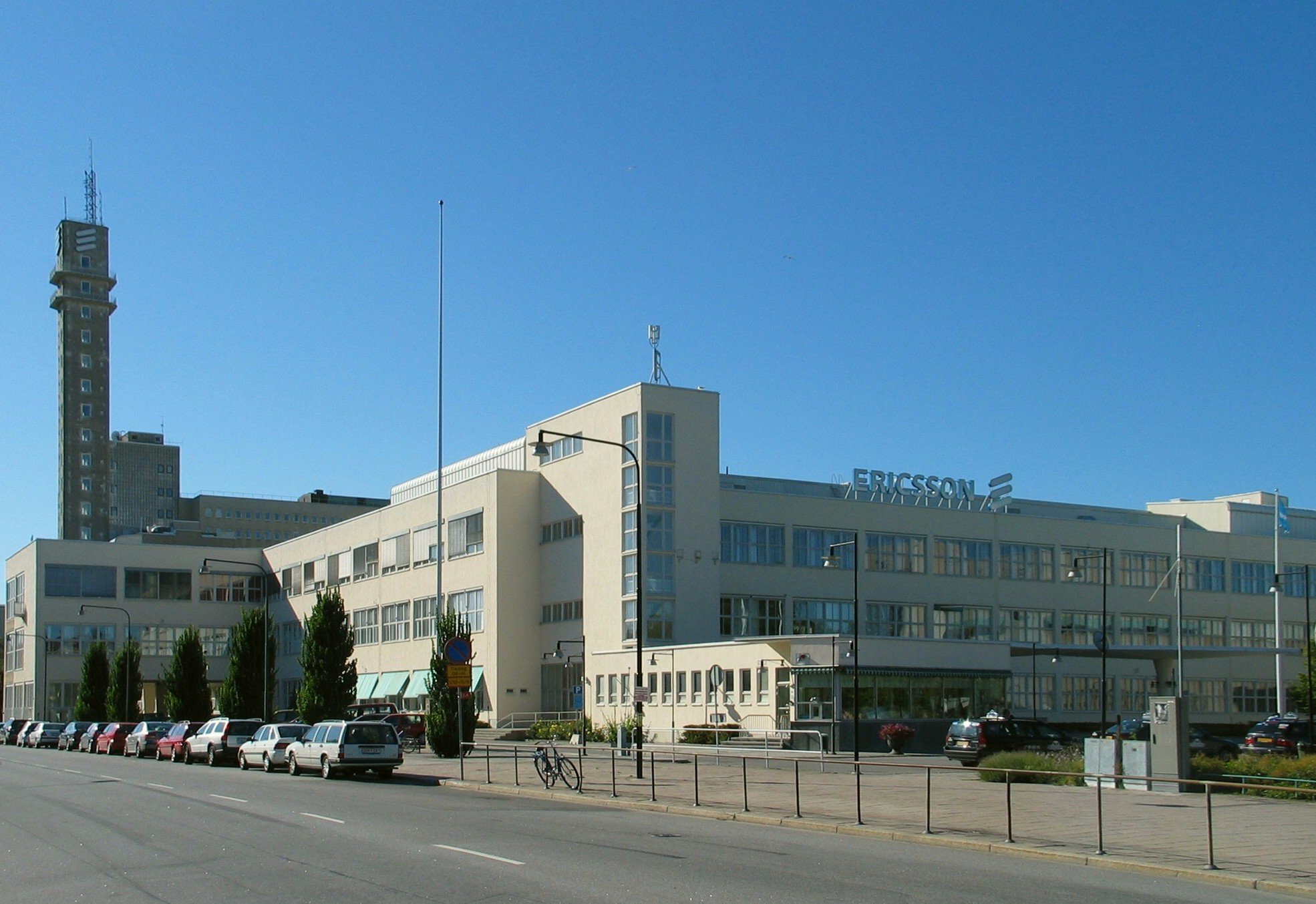
The LM Ericsson building, the company's former headquarters at Telefonplan in Stockholm

Ericsson ignored the growth of automatic telephony in the United States and concentrated on manual exchange designs. Their first dial telephone was produced in 1921, although sales of the early automatic switching systems were slow until the equipment had proven itself on the world's markets. Telephones of this period had a simpler design and finish, and many of the early automatic desk telephones in Ericsson's catalogues were magneto styles with a dial on the front and appropriate changes to the electronics. Elaborate decals decorated the cases. World War I, the subsequent Great Depression and the loss of its Russian assets after the Revolution slowed the company's development while sales to other countries fell by about half.

=== Shareholding changes ===
The acquisition of other telecommunications companies put pressure on Ericsson's finances; in 1925, Karl Fredric Wincrantz took control of the company by acquiring most of the shares. Wincrantz was partly funded by Ivar Kreuger, an international financier. The company was renamed Telefonaktiebolaget L M Ericsson. Kreuger started showing interest in the company, being a major owner of Wincrantz holding companies.

=== Wallenberg era begins ===
Ericsson was saved from bankruptcy and closure with the help of banks including Stockholms Enskilda Bank (now Skandinaviska Enskilda Banken) and other Swedish investment banks controlled by the Wallenberg family, and some Swedish government backing. Marcus Wallenberg Jr. negotiated a deal with several Swedish banks to rebuild Ericsson financially. The banks gradually increased their possession of LM Ericsson "A" shares, while International Telephone & Telegraph (ITT) was still the largest shareholder. In 1960, the Wallenberg family bought ITT's shares in Ericsson, and has since controlled the company.

=== Market development ===
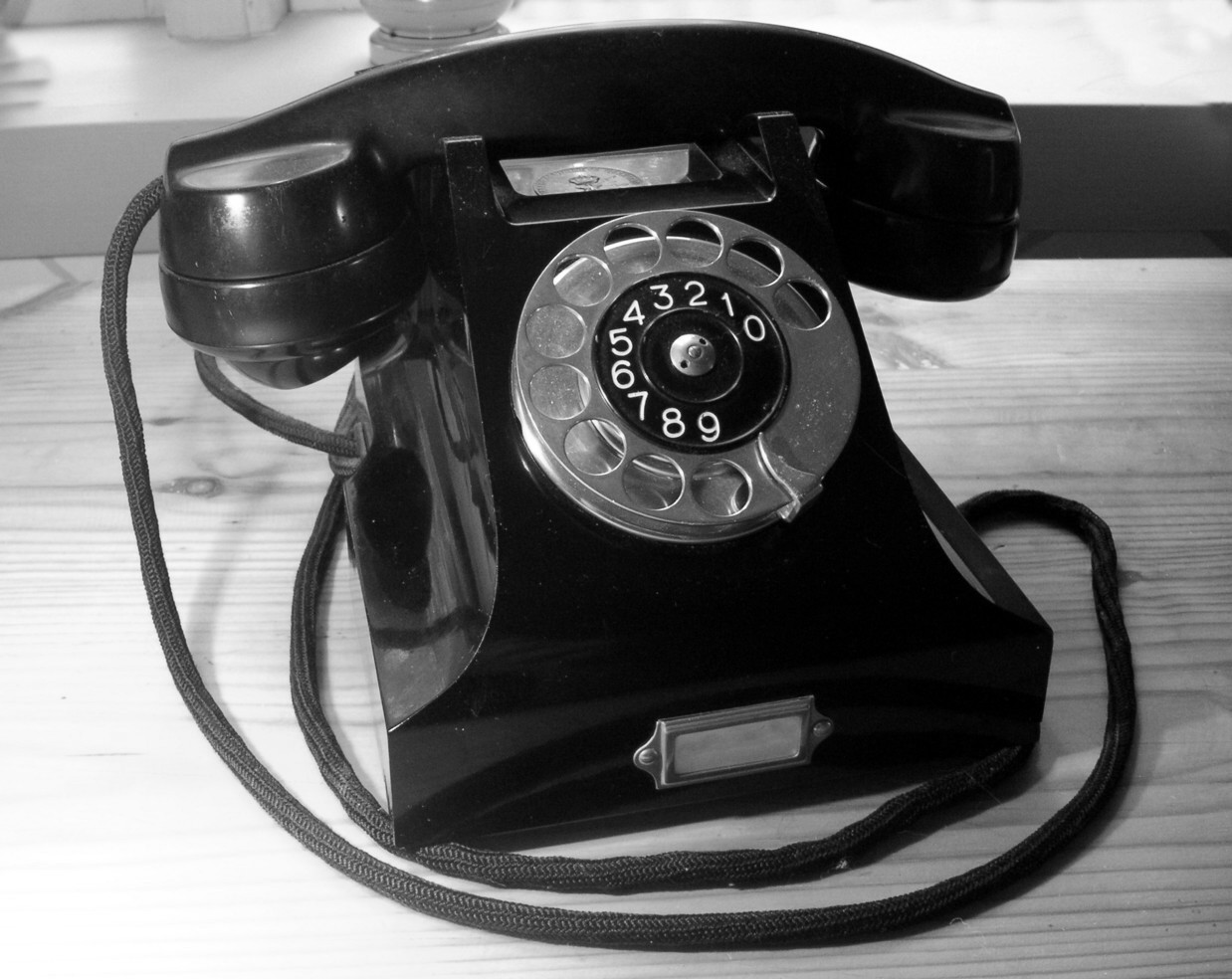
The Ericsson DBH1001 (1931) was the first combined telephone set with a housing and handset made from Bakelite. The design is attributed to Jean Heiberg.

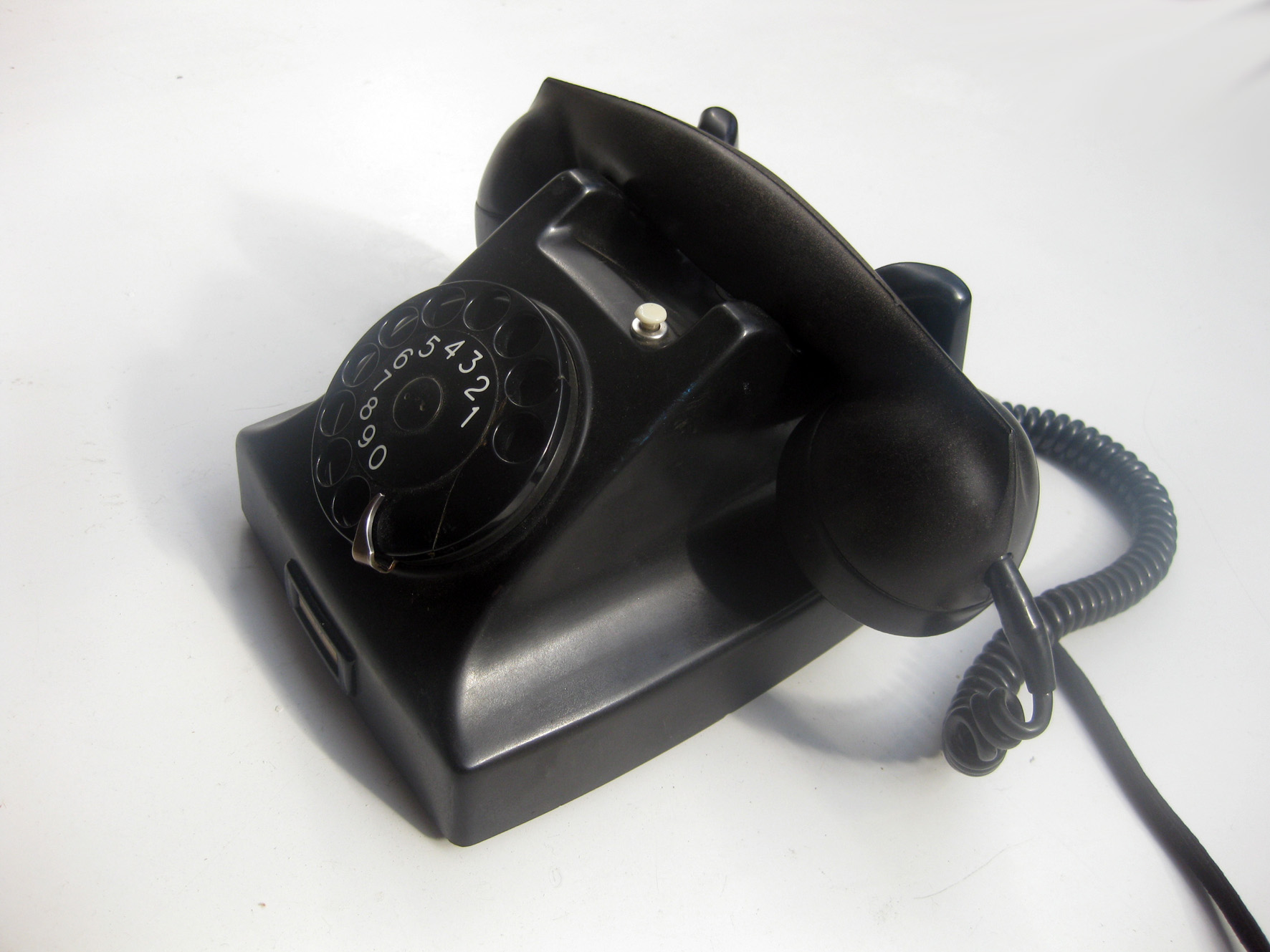
The Ericsson DBH15 telephone, a successor of the DBH 1001 and redesigned in 1947 by Gerard Kiljan

In the 1920s and 1930s, the world telephone markets were being organized and stabilized by many governments. The fragmented town-by-town systems serviced by small, private companies that had evolved were integrated and offered for lease to a single company. Ericsson obtained some leases, which represented further sales of equipment to the growing networks. Ericsson got almost one-third of its sales under the control of its telephone operating companies.

=== Further development ===
Ericsson introduced the world's first fully automatic mobile telephone system, MTA, in 1956. It released one of the world's first hands-free speaker telephones in the 1960s. In 1954, it released the Ericofon. Ericsson crossbar switching equipment was used in telephone administrations in many countries. In 1983 the company introduced the ERIPAX suite of network products and services.

=== Emergence of the Internet (1995–2003) ===
In the 1990s, during the emergence of the Internet, Ericsson was regarded as slow to realize its potential and falling behind in the area of IP technology. But the company had established an Internet project in 1995 called Infocom Systems to exploit opportunities leading from fixed-line telecom and IT. CEO Lars Ramqvist wrote in the 1996 annual report that in all three of its business areas – Mobile Telephones and Terminals, Mobile Systems, and Infocom Systems – "we will expand our operations as they relate to customer service and Internet Protocol (IP) access (Internet and intranet access)".

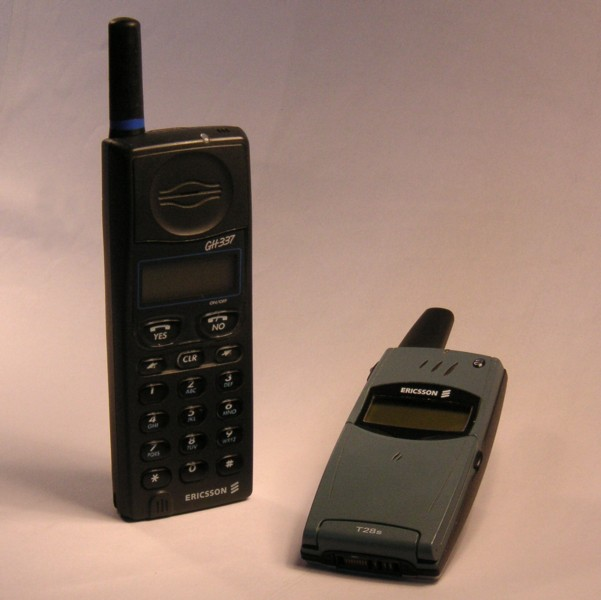
An Ericsson GH337 (1995) and Ericsson T28 (1999) mobile phones

The growth of GSM, which became a de facto world standard, combined with Ericsson's other mobile standards, such as D-AMPS and PDC, meant that by the start of 1997, Ericsson had an estimated 40% share of the world's mobile market, with around 54 million subscribers. There were also around 188 million AXE lines in place or on order in 117 countries. Telecom and chip companies worked in the 1990s to provide Internet access over mobile telephones. Early versions such as Wireless Application Protocol (WAP) used packet data over the existing GSM network, in a form known as GPRS (General Packet Radio Service), but these services, known as 2.5G, were fairly rudimentary and did not achieve much mass-market success.

The International Telecommunication Union (ITU) had prepared the specifications for a 3G mobile service that included several technologies. Ericsson pushed hard for the WCDMA (wideband CDMA) form based on the GSM standard and began testing it in 1996. Japanese operator NTT Docomo signed deals to partner with Ericsson and Nokia, who came together in 1997 to support WCDMA over rival standards. DoCoMo was the first operator with a live 3G network, using its own version of WCDMA called FOMA. Ericsson was a significant developer of the WCDMA version of GSM, while US-based chip developer Qualcomm promoted the alternative system CDMA2000, building on the popularity of CDMA in the US market. This resulted in a patent infringement lawsuit that was resolved in March 1999 when the two companies agreed to pay each other royalties for the use of their respective technologies and Ericsson purchased Qualcomm's wireless infrastructure business and some R&D resources.

Ericsson issued a profit warning in March 2001. Over the coming year, sales to operators halved. Mobile telephones became a burden; the company's telephones unit made a loss of SEK 24 billion in 2000. A fire in a Philips chip factory in New Mexico in March 2000 caused severe disruption to Ericsson's phone production, dealing a coup de grâce to Ericsson's mobile phone hopes. Mobile phones would be spun off into a joint venture with Sony, Sony Ericsson Mobile Communications, in October 2001. Ericsson launched several rounds of restructuring, refinancing and job-cutting; during 2001, staff numbers fell from 107,000 to 85,000. A further 20,000 went the next year, and 11,000 more in 2003. A new rights issue raised SEK 30 billion to keep the company afloat. The company had survived as mobile Internet started growing. With record profits, it was in better shape than many of its competitors.

=== Rebuilding and growing (2003–2018) ===
The emergence of full mobile Internet began a period of growth for the global telecom industry, including Ericsson. After the launch of 3G services in 2003, people started to access the Internet using their telephones.

Ericsson was working on ways to improve WCDMA as operators were buying and rolling it out; it was the first generation of 3G access. New advances included IMS (IP Multimedia Subsystem) and the next evolution of WCDMA, called High-Speed Packet Access (HSPA). It was initially deployed in the download version called HSDPA; the technology spread from the first test calls in the US in late 2005 to 59 commercial networks in September 2006. HSPA would provide the world's first mobile broadband.

In July 2016, Hans Vestberg stepped down as Ericsson's CEO after heading the company for six years. Jan Frykhammar, who had been working for the company since 1991 stepped in as interim CEO while Ericsson searched for a full-time replacement. On 16 January 2017, following Ericsson's announcement on 26 October 2016, new CEO Börje Ekholm started and interim CEO Jan Frykhammar stepped down the following day.

In June 2018, Ericsson, Inc. and Ericsson AB have agreed to pay $145,893 to settle potential civil liability for an apparent violation of the International Emergency Economic Powers Act (IEEPA) and the Sudanese Sanctions Regulations, 31 C.F.R. part 538 (SSR).1

=== Acquisitions and cooperation ===
Around 2000, companies and governments began to push for standards for mobile Internet. In May 2000, the European Commission created the Wireless Strategic Initiative, a consortium of four telecommunications suppliers in Europe – Ericsson, Nokia, Alcatel (France) and Siemens (Germany) – to develop and test new prototypes for advanced wireless communications systems. Later that year, the consortium partners invited other companies to join them in a Wireless World Research Forum in 2001. In December 1999, Microsoft and Ericsson announced a strategic partnership to combine the former's web browser and server software with the latter's mobile-internet technologies. In 2000, the Dot-com bubble burst with marked economic implications for Sweden. Ericsson, the world's largest producer of mobile telecommunications equipment, shed thousands of jobs, as did the country's Internet consulting firms and dot-com start-ups. In the same year, Intel, the world's largest semiconductor chip manufacturer, signed a $1.5 billion deal to supply flash memory to Ericsson over the next three years.

The short-lived partnership, called Ericsson Microsoft Mobile Venture, owned 70/30 percent by Ericsson and Microsoft respectively, ended in October 2001 when Ericsson announced it would absorb the former joint venture and adopt a licensing agreement with Microsoft instead. The same month, Ericsson and Sony announced the creation of the mobile phone manufacturing joint venture: Sony Ericsson Mobile Communications. Ten years later, in February 2012, Ericsson sold its stake in the joint venture; Ericsson said it wanted to focus on the global wireless market as a whole.

Lower stock prices and job losses affected many telecommunications companies in 2001. The major equipment manufacturers – Motorola (U.S.), Lucent Technologies (U.S.), Cisco Systems (U.S.), Marconi (UK), Siemens (Germany), Nokia (Finland), as well as Ericsson – all announced job cuts in their home countries and subsidiaries around the world. Ericsson's workforce worldwide fell during 2001 from 107,000 to 85,000.

In September 2001, Ericsson purchased the remaining shares in EHPT from Hewlett-Packard. Founded in 1993, Ericsson Hewlett Packard Telecom (EHPT) was a joint venture made up of 60% Ericsson interests and 40% Hewlett-Packard interests.

In 2002, ICT investor losses topped $2 trillion and share prices fell by 95% until August that year. More than half a million people lost their jobs in the global telecom industry over the two years. The collapse of U.S. carrier WorldCom, with more than $107 billion in assets, was the biggest in U.S. history. The sector's problems caused bankruptcies and job losses, and led to changes in the leadership of several major companies. Ericsson made 20,000 more staff redundant and raised about $3 billion from its shareholders. In June 2002, Infineon Technologies (then the sixth-largest semiconductor supplier and a subsidiary of Siemens) bought Ericsson's microelectronics unit for $400 million.

Ericsson was an official backer in the 2005 launch of the .mobi top-level domain created specifically for the mobile internet.

Co-operation with Hewlett-Packard did not end with EHPT; in 2003 Ericsson outsourced its IT to HP, which included Managed Services, Help Desk Support, Data Center Operations, and HP Utility Data Center. The contract was extended in 2008. In October 2005, Ericsson acquired the bulk of the troubled UK telecommunications manufacturer Marconi Company, including its brand name that dates back to the creation of the original Marconi Company by the "father of radio" Guglielmo Marconi. In September 2006, Ericsson sold the greater part of its defense business Ericsson Microwave Systems, which mainly produced sensor and radar systems, to Saab AB, which renamed the company to Saab Microwave Systems.

In 2007, Ericsson acquired carrier edge-router maker Redback Networks, and then Entrisphere, a US-based company providing fiber-access technology. In September 2007, Ericsson acquired an 84% interest in German customer-care and billing software firm LHS, a stake later raised to 100%. In 2008, Ericsson sold its enterprise PBX division to Aastra Technologies, and acquired Tandberg Television, the television technology division of Norwegian company Tandberg.

In 2009, Ericsson bought the CDMA2000 and LTE business of Nortel's carrier networks division for US$1.18 billion; Bizitek, a Turkish business support systems integrator; the Estonian manufacturing operations of electronic manufacturing company Elcoteq; and completed its acquisition of LHS. Acquisitions in 2010 included assets from the Strategy and Technology Group of inCode, a North American business and consulting-services company; Nortel's majority shareholding (50% plus one share) in LG-Nortel, a joint venture between LG Electronics and Nortel Networks providing sales, R&D and industrial capacity in South Korea, now known as Ericsson-LG; further Nortel carrier-division assets, relating from Nortel's GSM business in the United States and Canada; Optimi Corporation, a U.S.–Spanish telecommunications vendor specializing in network optimization and management;< and Pride, a consulting and systems-integration company operating in Italy.

In 2011, Ericsson acquired manufacturing and research facilities, and staff from the Guangdong Nortel Telecommunication Equipment Company (GDNT) as well as Nortel's Multiservice Switch business. Ericsson acquired U.S. company Telcordia Technologies in January 2012, an operations and business support systems (OSS/BSS) company. In March, Ericsson announced it was buying the broadcast-services division of Technicolor, a media broadcast technology company. In April 2012 Ericsson completed the acquisition of BelAir Networks a strong Wi-Fi network technology company.

On 3 May 2013, Ericsson announced it would divest its power cable operations to Danish company NKT Holding. On 1 July 2013, Ericsson announced it would acquire the media management company Red Bee Media, subject to regulatory approval. The acquisition was completed on 9 May 2014. In September 2013, Ericsson completed its acquisition of Microsoft's Mediaroom business and televisions services, originally announced in April the same year. The acquisition makes Ericsson the largest provider of IPTV and multi-screen services in the world, by market share; it was renamed Ericsson Mediaroom. In September 2014, Ericsson acquired majority stake in Apcera for cloud policy compliance. In October 2015, Ericsson completed the acquisition of Envivio, a software encoding company. In April 2016, Ericsson acquired Polish and Ukrainian operations of software development company Ericpol, a long-time supplier to Ericsson. Approximately 2,300 Ericpol employees joined Ericsson, bringing software development competence in radio, cloud, and IP.

On 20 June 2017, Bloomberg disclosed that Ericsson hired Morgan Stanley to explore the sale of its media businesses. The Red Bee Media business was kept in-house as an independent subsidiary company, as no suitable buyer was found, but a 51% stake of the remainder of the Media Solution division was sold to private equity firm One Equity Partners, the new company being named MediaKind. The transaction was completed on 31 January 2019. In February 2018, Ericsson acquired the location-based mobile data management platform Placecast. Ericsson has since integrated Placecast's platform and capabilities with its programmatic mobile ad subsidiary, Emodo. In May 2018, SoftBank partnered with Ericsson to trial new radio technology. In September 2020, Ericsson acquired US-based carrier equipment manufacturer Cradlepoint for $1.1 billion.

In November 2021, Ericsson announced it had reached an agreement to acquire Vonage for $6.2 billion. The acquisition completed in July 2022. In January 2024, Ericson and MTN Group announced expansion of their partnership to boost their mobile financial services on Africa market, as the company appointed Michael Wallis-Brown as vice president responsible for global mobile financial services.

In December 2024, Ericsson secured a multi-year extension deal worth billions with Bharti Airtel for the provision of 4G and 5G radio access network products and solutions. This agreement underscores the growing demand for advanced telecommunications infrastructure as the industry transitions to 5G technologies.

In January 2026, Ericsson announced a plan to return 15 billion Swedish crowns ($1.7 billion) to investors through its first share buyback programme.

== Corporate governance ==
As of 2016, members of the board of directors of LM Ericsson were: Leif Johansson, Jacob Wallenberg, Kristin S. Rinne, Helena Stjernholm, Sukhinder Singh Cassidy, Börje Ekholm, Ulf J. Johansson, Mikael Lännqvist, Zlatko Hadzic, Kjell-Åke Soting, Nora Denzel, Kristin Skogen Lund, Pehr Claesson, Karin Åberg and Roger Svensson.

== Research and development ==
Ericsson has structured its R&D in three levels depending on when products or technologies will be introduced to customers and users. Its research and development organization is part of 'Group Function Technology' and addresses several facets of network architecture: wireless access networks; radio access technologies; broadband technologies; packet technologies; multimedia technologies; services software; EMF safety and sustainability; security; and global services. The head of research since 2012 is Sara Mazur.

Group Function Technology holds research co-operations with several major universities and research institutes including Lund University in Sweden, Eötvös Loránd University in Hungary and Beijing Institute of Technology in China. Ericsson also holds research co-operations within several European research programs such as GigaWam and OASE. Ericsson holds 33,000 granted patents and is the number-one holder of GSM/GPRS/EDGE, WCDMA/HSPA, and LTE essential patents. In 2023, the World Intellectual Property Organization (WIPO)'s Annual PCT Review ranked Ericsson's number of patent applications published under the PCT System as 7th in the world, with 1,863 patent applications being published during 2023.

Ericsson hosts a developer program called Ericsson Developer Connection designed to encourage development of applications and services. Ericsson also has an open innovation initiative for beta applications and beta API's & tools called Ericsson Labs. The company hosts several internal innovation competitions among its employees.

In May 2022, it was announced that Ericsson and Intel are pooling R&D excellence to create high-performing Cloud RAN. The organisations have pooled to launch a tech hub in California, USA. The hub focuses on the benefits that Ericsson Cloud RAN and Intel technology can bring to: improving energy efficiency and network performance, reducing time to market, and monetizing new business opportunities such as enterprise applications.

== Products and services ==
Ericsson's business includes technology research, development, network systems and software development, and running operations for telecom service providers. and software Ericsson offers end-to-end services for all major mobile communication standards, and has three main business units.

=== Business Area Networks ===
Business Area Networks, previously called Business Unit Networks, develop network infrastructure for communication needs over mobile and fixed connections. Its products include radio base stations, radio network controllers, mobile switching centers and service application nodes. Operators use Ericsson products to migrate from 2G to 3G and, most recently, to 4G networks.

The company's network division has been described as a driver in the development of 2G, 3G, 4G/LTE and 5G technology, and the evolution towards all-IP, and it develops and deploys advanced LTE systems, but it is still developing the older GSM, WCDMA, and CDMA technologies. The company's networks portfolio also includes microwave transport, Internet Protocol (IP) networks, fixed-access services for copper and fiber, and mobile broadband modules, several levels of fixed broadband access, radio access networks from small pico cells to high-capacity macro cells and controllers for radio base stations.

==== Network services ====
Ericsson's network rollout services employ in-house capabilities, subcontractors and central resources to make changes to live networks. Services such as technology deployment, network transformation, support services and network optimization are also provided.

=== Business Area Digital Services ===
This unit provides core networks, Operations Support Systems such as network management and analytics, and Business Support Systems such as billing and mediation. Within the Digital Services unit, there is an m-Commerce offering, which focuses on service providers and facilitates their working with financial institutions and intermediaries. Ericsson has announced m-commerce deals with Western Union and African wireless carrier MTN.

=== Business Area Managed Services ===
The unit is active in 180 countries; it supplies managed services, systems integration, consulting, network rollout, design and optimization, broadcast services, learning services and support.

The company also works with television and media, public safety, and utilities. Ericsson claims to manage networks that serve more than 1 billion subscribers worldwide, and to support customer networks that serve more than 2.5 billion subscribers.

=== Broadcast services ===
Ericsson's Broadcast Services unit was evolved into a unit called Red Bee Media, which has been spun out into a joint venture. It deals with the playout of live and pre-recorded, commercial and public service television programmes, including presentation (continuity announcements), trailers, and ancillary access services such as closed-caption subtitles, audio description and in-vision sign language interpreters. Its media management services consist of Managed Media Preparation and Managed Media Internet Delivery.

== Divested businesses ==
Sony Ericsson Mobile Communications AB (Sony Ericsson) was a joint venture with Sony that merged the previous mobile telephone operations of both companies. It manufactured mobile telephones, accessories and personal computer (PC) cards. Sony Ericsson was responsible for product design and development, marketing, sales, distribution and customer services. On 16 February 2012, Sony announced it had completed the full acquisition of Sony Ericsson, after which it changed name to Sony Mobile Communications, and nearly a year later it moved headquarters from Sweden to Japan.

=== Mobile phones ===
As a joint venture with Sony, Ericsson's mobile telephone production was moved into the company Sony Ericsson in 2001. The following is a list of mobile phones marketed under the brand name Ericsson.

- Ericsson GS88 – 1997 cancelled mobile telephone Ericsson invented the "Smartphone" name for
- Ericsson GA628 – Known for its Z80 CPU

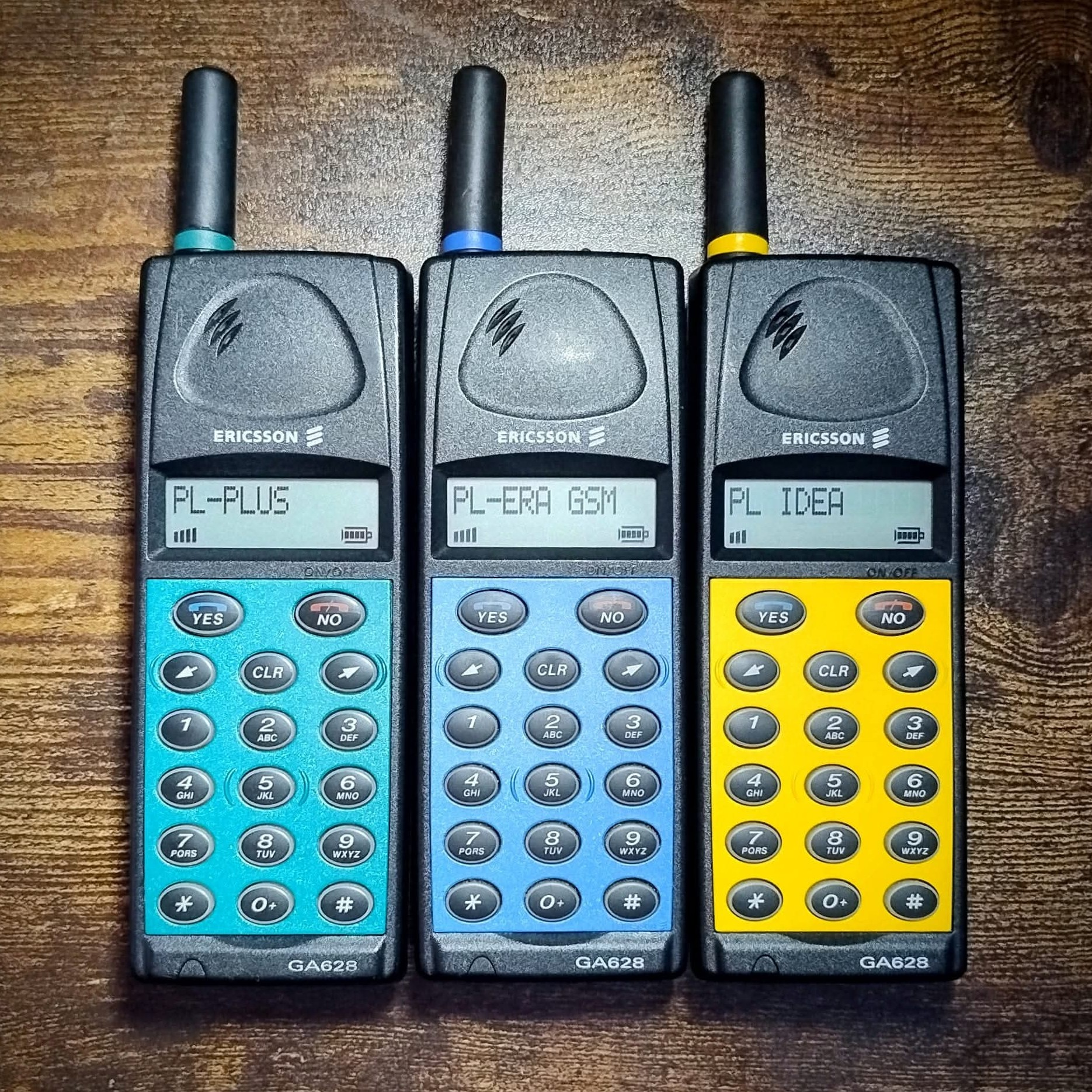
Ericsson GA628 with different removable color panels

- Ericsson SH888 – First mobile telephone to have wireless modem capabilities
- Ericsson A1018 – Dualband cellphone, notably easy to hack
- Ericsson A2618 & Ericsson A2628 – Dualband cellphones. Use graphical LCD based on PCF8548 I²C controller.
- Ericsson PF768
- Ericsson GF768
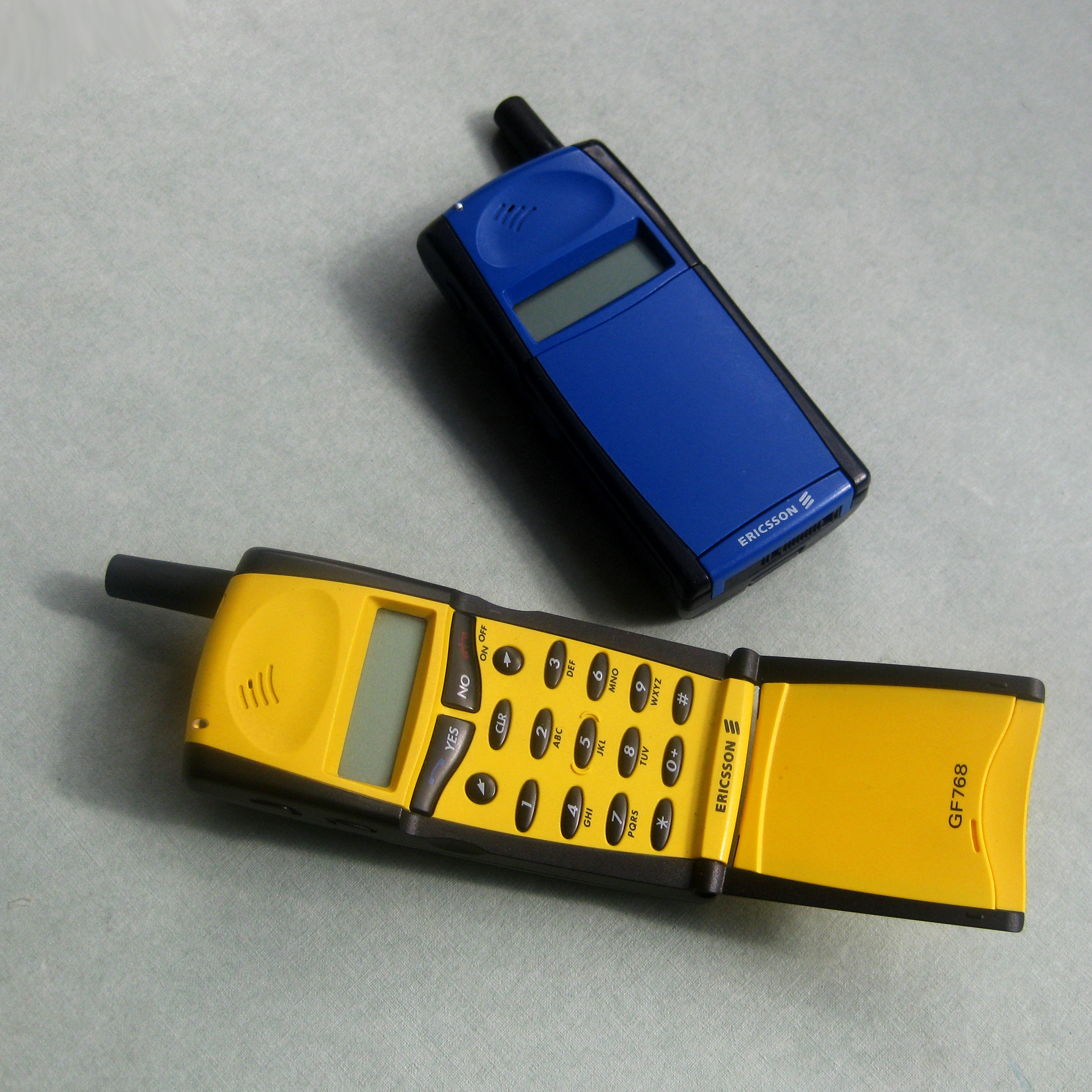
  GF 768
- Ericsson DH318 - One of the earliest TDMA/AMPS phones in the USA
- Ericsson GH388
- Ericsson GF388
- Ericsson T10 – Colourful cellphone
- Ericsson T18 – Business model of the T10, with active flip
- Ericsson T28 – Very slim telephone. Uses lithium polymer batteries. Ericsson T28 FAQ use graphical LCD based on PCF8558 I²C controller.
- Ericsson T20s
- Ericsson T29s – Similar to the T28s, but with WAP support
- Ericsson T29m – Pre-alpha prototype for the T39m
- Ericsson T36m – Prototype for the T39m. Announced in yellow and blue. Never hit the market due to release T39m
- Ericsson T39 – Similar to the T28, but with a GPRS modem, Bluetooth and triband capabilities
- Ericsson T65
- Ericsson T66
- Ericsson T68m – The first Ericsson handset to have a color display, later branded as Sony Ericsson T68i
- Ericsson R250s Pro – Fully dust- and water resistant telephone
- Ericsson R310s
- Ericsson R320s
- Ericsson R320s Titan – Limited Edition with titanium front
- Ericsson R320s GPRS – Prototype for testing GPRS networks
- Ericsson R360m – Pre-alpha prototype for the R520m
- Ericsson R380 – First cellphone to use the Symbian OS
- Ericsson R520m – Similar to the T39, but in a candy bar form factor and with added features such as a built-in speakerphone and an optical proximity sensor
- Ericsson R520m UMTS – Prototype to test UMTS networks
- Ericsson R520m SyncML – Prototype to test the SyncML implementation
- Ericsson R580m – Announced in several press releases. Supposed to be a successor of the R380s without external antenna and with color display
- Ericsson R600

=== Telephones ===
- Ericsson Dialog
- Ericofon

=== Ericsson Mobile Platforms ===
Ericsson Mobile Platforms existed for eight years; on 12 February 2009, Ericsson announced it would be merged with the mobile platform company of STMicroelectronics, ST-NXP Wireless, to create a 50/50 joint venture owned by Ericsson and STMicroelectronics. This joint venture was divested in 2013 and remaining activities can be found in Ericsson Modems and STMicroelectronics. Ericsson Mobile Platform ceased being a legal entity early 2009.

=== Ericsson Enterprise ===
Starting in 1983 Ericsson Enterprise provided communications systems and services for businesses, public entities and educational institutions. It produced products for voice over Internet protocol (VoIP)-based private branch exchanges (PBX), wireless local area networks (WLAN), and mobile intranets. Ericsson Enterprise operated mainly from Sweden but also operated through regional units and other partners/distributors. In 2008 it was sold to Aastra.

== Corruption ==
On 7 December 2019, Ericsson agreed to pay more than $1.2 billion (€1.09 billion) to settle U.S. Department of Justice FCPA criminal and civil investigations into foreign corruption. US authorities accused the company of conducting a campaign of corruption between 2000 and 2016 across China, Indonesia, Vietnam, Kuwait and Djibouti. Ericsson admitted to paying bribes, falsifying books and records and failing to implement reasonable internal accounting controls in an attempt to strengthen its position in the telecommunications industry.

In 2022, an internal investigation into corruption inside the company was leaked by the International Consortium of Investigative Journalists. It detailed corruption in at least 10 countries. Ericsson has admitted "serious breaches of compliance rules".

The leak also revealed that some subcontractors working on behalf of Ericsson paid bribes to the Islamic State in order to continue operating the telecom network in occupied regions of Iraq.

== See also ==
- Cedergren
- Damovo
- Ericsson Nikola Tesla
- Erlang (programming language)
- Investor AB
- List of networking hardware vendors
- List of Sony Ericsson products
- Red Jade
- Tandberg Television
