= Ericsson Hewlett Packard Telecom =

Joint venture by Ericsson and Hewlett-Packard

Ericsson Hewlett Packard Telecom (EHPT) was a Swedish consortium made up of 60% Ericsson interests and 40% Hewlett-Packard interests. The company was founded in 1993 as a joint venture owned by Ericsson and Hewlett-Packard. It was an independent, world-class provider of application software and services to telecom operators and has installed 450 operations support and business support systems in 65 countries. Set up by Hewlett-Packard and Ericsson to address the telecoms industries "huge technological challenge in the early 1990s: that of moving from memechanical to electronic switching platforms"...

The alliance was complex as the two companies had competing solutions. The consortium was dissolved when Ericsson bought the remaining 40% from HP. EHPT's activities were consolidated into Ericsson's operations, effective September 4, 2001. Hewlett-packard remained a strong partner of Ericsson, reselling, implementing and supporting billing systems and business support systems through the different HP organizations.

In 2003, Ericsson outsourced its IT to Hewlett-Packard which included managed services, help desk support, data center operations, and the HP Utility Data Center. The contract was extended in 2008. Further joint go to markets between Ericsson and Hewlett-Packard occurred, including notably the Joint Telecoms Outsourcing, which was responsible for multiple $500m deals including those with H3G and Vodafone.

== See also ==
- Hans Vestberg
