= R290 =

R290 may refer to:

- Ericsson R290, a telephone
- R290 road (Ireland), a regional road in Ireland
- Propane, as used in refrigeration
