= T66 =

T66 may refer to:

- T66 (rocket launcher), an American multiple rocket launcher
- Avions Fairey T.66 Tipsy Nipper, a Belgian aerobatic aircraft
- Ericsson T66, a mobile phone
- Cooper T66, a racing car
- Hawker Hunter T.66, a British-built trainer aircraft
- INS Bitra (T66), a patrol vessel of the Indian Navy
- T66, the Swedish version of the EMD Class 66 Diesel locomotive
