= Ericsson R290 =

Mobile phone model

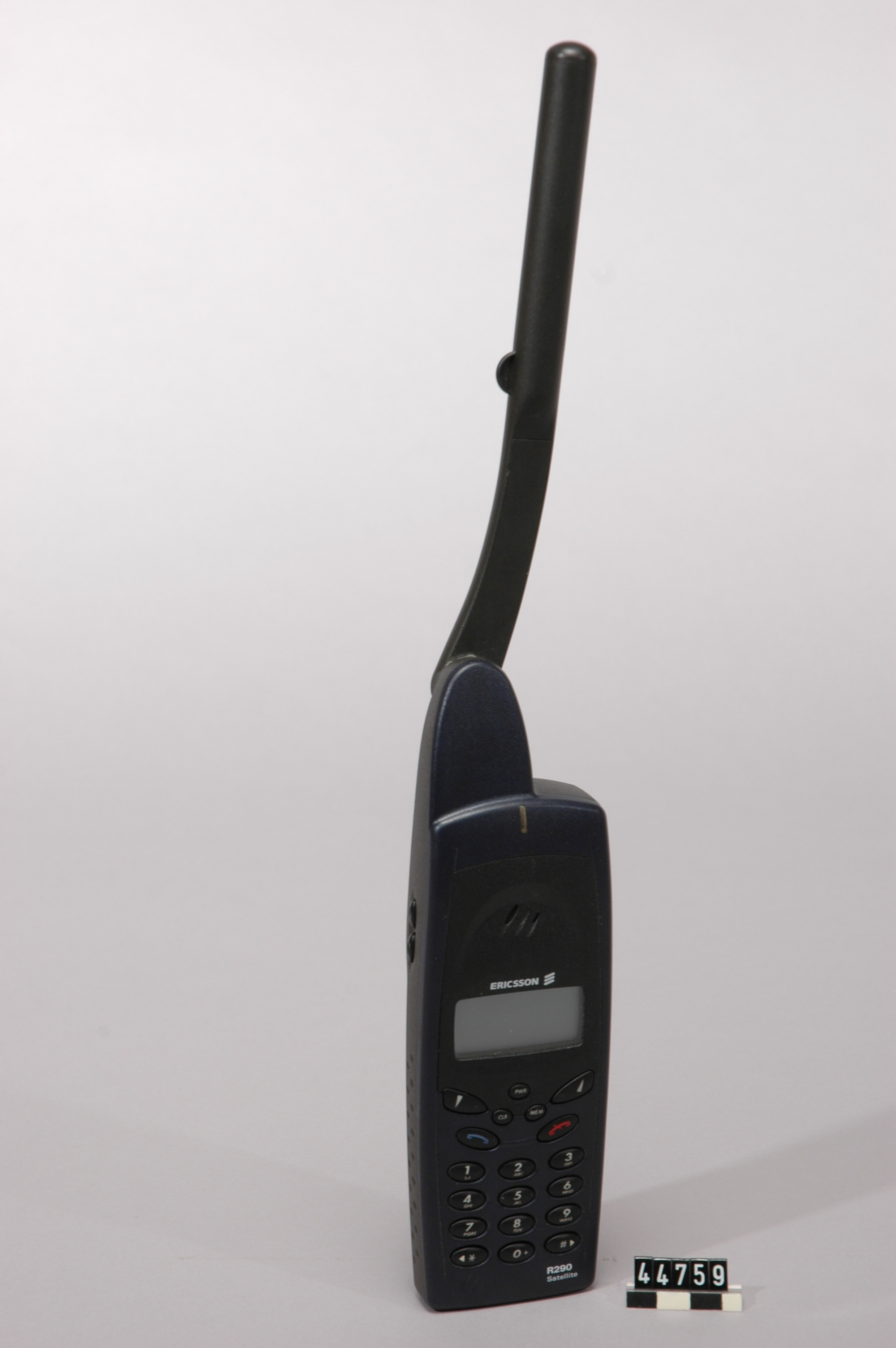
- R290 with its antenna extended to cater for satellite reception
- Manufacturer: Ericsson Mobile Communications
- Type: Combination basic phone/satellite phone
- Compatible networks: GSM 900/1800; L-Band 1616-1626.5 MHz
- Form factor: Bar
- Dimensions: 162 mm (6.4 in) H 62 mm (2.4 in) W 39 mm (1.5 in) D
- Weight: 350 g (12 oz) with slim battery
- Display: Monochrome bitmap LCD
- Connectivity: Proprietary accessories connector Proprietary charging connector
- Data inputs: Alpha-numeric keypad, Push buttons
- Other: SMS

The Ericsson R290 is a combined GSM and satellite phone using the Globalstar satellite network. The R290 was introduced in June 1999 and manufactured in the United Kingdom by Ericsson Mobile Communications.

The Globalstar uses a foldable antenna that is the same length as the body of the telephone. The R290 comes in a blue and black case in a style similar to other Ericsson phones of its period. The case incorporates some Gore-Tex weatherproofing, similar to that used in the Ericsson R310s, although less extensive.

The R290 also has a built-in modem for data and fax communication at 9.6 kbit/s in GSM mode and 7.2 kbit/s in satellite mode.

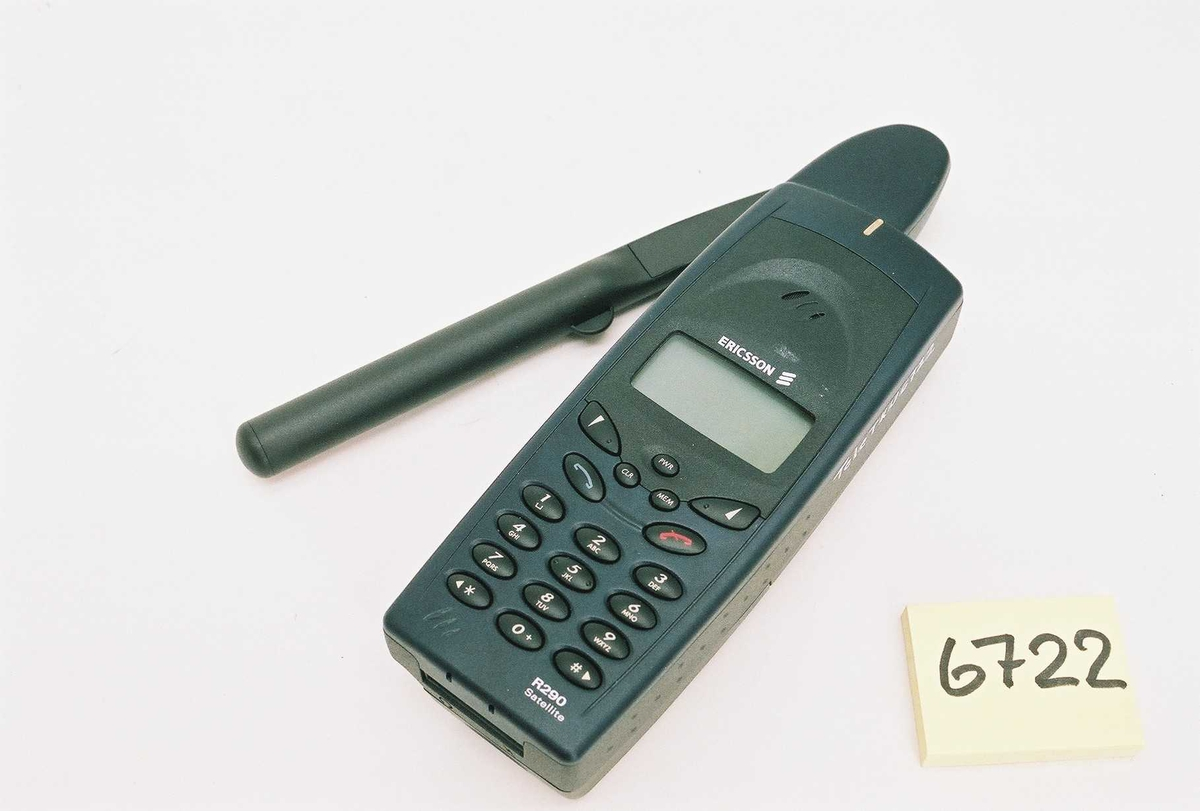
Ericsson R290 at Norwegian Telecom Museum

The R290 is somewhat larger than typical, pure GSM phones, measuring 162 mm (6.4 in) × 62 mm (2.4 in) × 39 mm (1.5 in) and weighing 350 g (12 oz) (with slim battery). The R290 has relatively brief battery life compared with typical, pure GSM phones of its generation.

Because it uses a non-standard battery voltage, its charging connector is not one of the types commonly seen on other Ericsson handsets. The device was capable of detecting over-voltage from inappropriate charging equipment, and warning the user to disconnect the charger.

The R290 spanned the corporate change from Ericsson to Sony Ericsson (when many of Ericsson's other phones were redesigned), being the only combined GSM and satellite phone in their range; it was not rebranded, however.

== Operators ==
For United Kingdom users, access to the Globalstar network was available when using a Vodafone GSM SIM card. From 2007, the Globalstar network experienced technical problems with its satellites, and the Vodafone arrangement is no longer in place.

== Bibliography ==
- "R290 Dual-Mode Satellite Phone" (PDF). common.globalstar.com. Globalstar, Inc. n.d. Archived from the original (PDF) on 2011-07-11. "Weight: 350 grams (with Slim battery)"
