= Cellmax =

Swedish technology company

CellMax Technologies, also known as Cellmax, is a Swedish developer and manufacturer of efficient antennas used for base stations in mobile networks.

CellMax Technologies was founded in 2001 and is headquartered in Kista, Stockholm, with subsidiaries in Singapore and the USA. In 2012, CellMax Technologies opened a factory outside Warsaw.

Cellmax was named a Deloitte Technology Fast 500 EMEA 2011 company as one of the fastest growing technology companies in Europe, the Middle East and Africa.

In 2012, Cellmax invested 20 million SEK in a research center and antenna laboratory in Kista. The plant is described as one of the world's most modern and will be used for research and development of the 'next generation' of base station antennas. King Carl XVI Gustaf of Sweden and Sweden's Prince Daniel opened the plant in summer 2012 along with global industry leaders in telecommunications, and foreign ambassadors.
