= ERIPAX =

ERIPAX (ERICSSON Packet Switching Exchange) was a suite of packet switched network products and services that was introduced in 1983 by Ericsson. It worked primarily over the X.25 standard, but X.28 and X.75 protocols were also used. It also supported TCP/IP and SNA network sessions, and eventually also worked over Frame Relay. The concentrators were Ericsson, but IBM equipment was frequently part of an ERIPAX solution.
