= Apcera =

American cloud infrastructure company

- Type: Private
- Industry: Technology; Software
- Founded: 2012
- Founder: Derek Collison
- Headquarters: San Francisco, CA
- Area served: Worldwide
- Key people: Derek Collison (CEO)
- Number of employees: 120 (2016)
- Website: apcera.com

Apcera is an American cloud infrastructure company that provides a container management platform to deploy, orchestrate and govern containers and applications across on-premises and cloud-based infrastructure.

== Company Overview ==
Apcera was founded in 2012 in San Francisco by Derek Collison, previously a technology leader at Google, TIBCO and VMware (where he designed the first open Platform-as-a-Service (PaaS), Cloud Foundry).

Apcera’s primary offering, the Apcera Cloud Platform, provides IT governance and security through a policy driven model, allowing for the safe deployment and management of cloud-native applications, microservices, legacy applications, as well as IT resources, network and services access, and user permissions.

According to Forbes [Tech], the Apcera Cloud Platform enables clients "to manage the migration from legacy infrastructure to newer approaches and... allows them to achieve significantly faster time-to-market for … critical deployments, without sacrificing crucial security requirements”.

In September 2014, Ericsson acquired a majority stake in Apcera for cloud policy compliance.

== Software ==
The Apcera Cloud Platform is available in two forms: a Community Edition and an Enterprise Edition. The Community Edition is free and can be used for deployment to a single infrastructure. The Enterprise Edition has the functionality to deploy workloads to multiple infrastructures. The Apcera Cloud Platform allows the user to create a set of rules to control available resources at a container level. In addition, it allows a user to connect to back-end services outside of the platform while maintaining governance. It allows users to build a workload once and then move it around in its container without re-writing the code — it only needs the connections made between containers.

Apcera also develops and provides support for several open source software projects, including NATS, a cloud-native enterprise messaging system, Kurma, a container runtime with extensibility and flexibility, and Libretto, a Golang virtual machine provisioning library for public and private clouds.

== Major Clients ==
Some of Apcera’s customers include nextSource, Ericsson, Qualcomm, Cygate, Rodan Fields.

== Company Timeline ==
Date	Event
March 4, 2012	Derek Collison writes the original code of the Apcera Platform
June 18, 2012	Meeting at True Ventures (Official Anniversary of Apcera)
July 13, 2013	Series A funding closes
May 14, 2014	First orchestrator deployed. Began switching clusters to orchestrator
July 31, 2014	Nats.io launch
September 30, 2014	Majority stake acquired by Ericsson
April 8, 2015	Jeff Thomas joins as Chief Marketing Officer
June 23, 2015	Apcera joins the Open Container Initiative
December 17, 2015	Apcera Joins the Cloud Native Computing Foundation
March 24, 2016	Apcera‘s Community Edition launched
April 4, 2016	Mark Thiele joins as Chief Strategy Officer
