= Kista =

District in Rinkeby-Kista, Stockholm, Sweden

Coordinates: 59°24′05″N 17°56′40″E

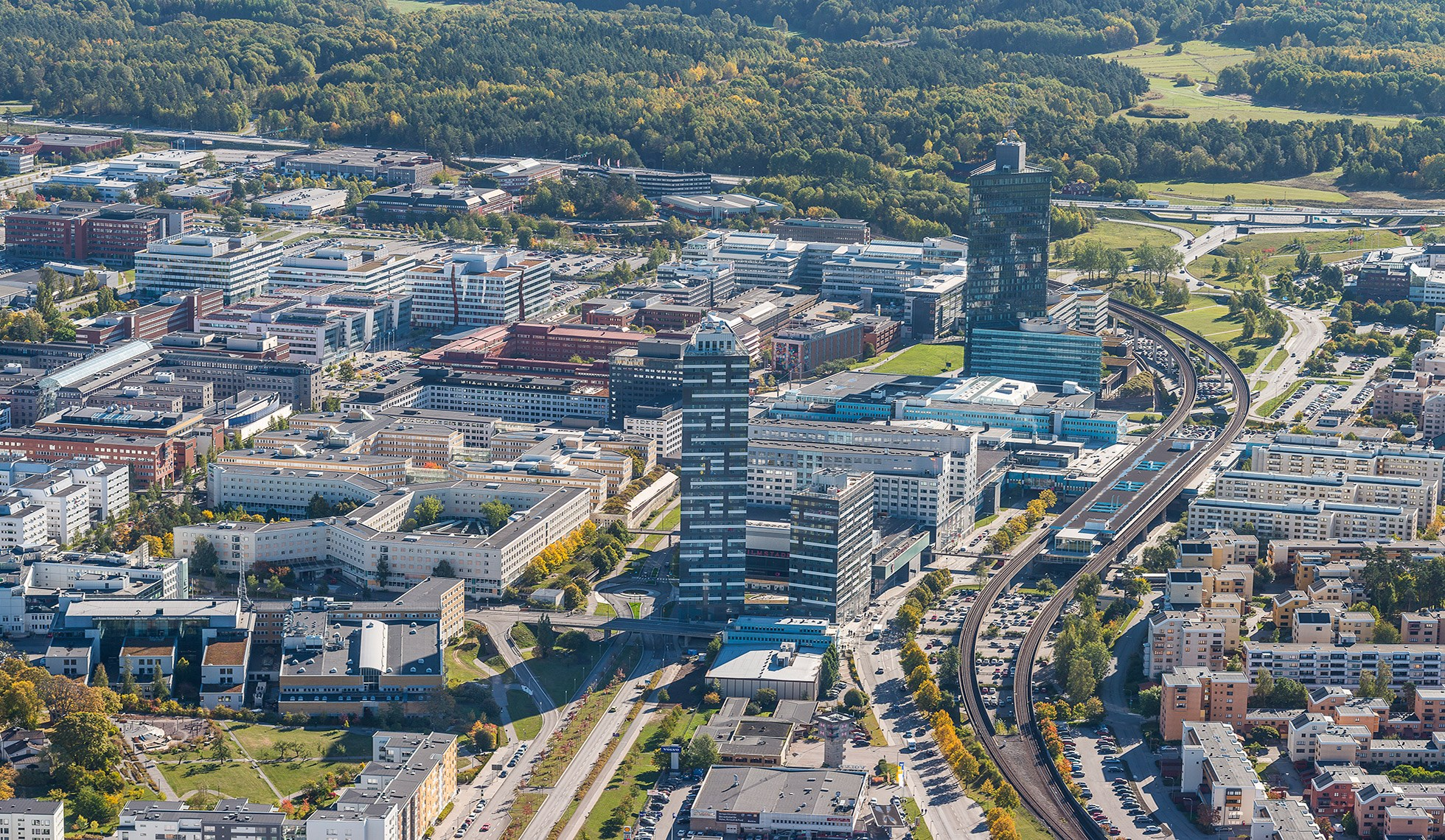
Aerial overview of central Kista

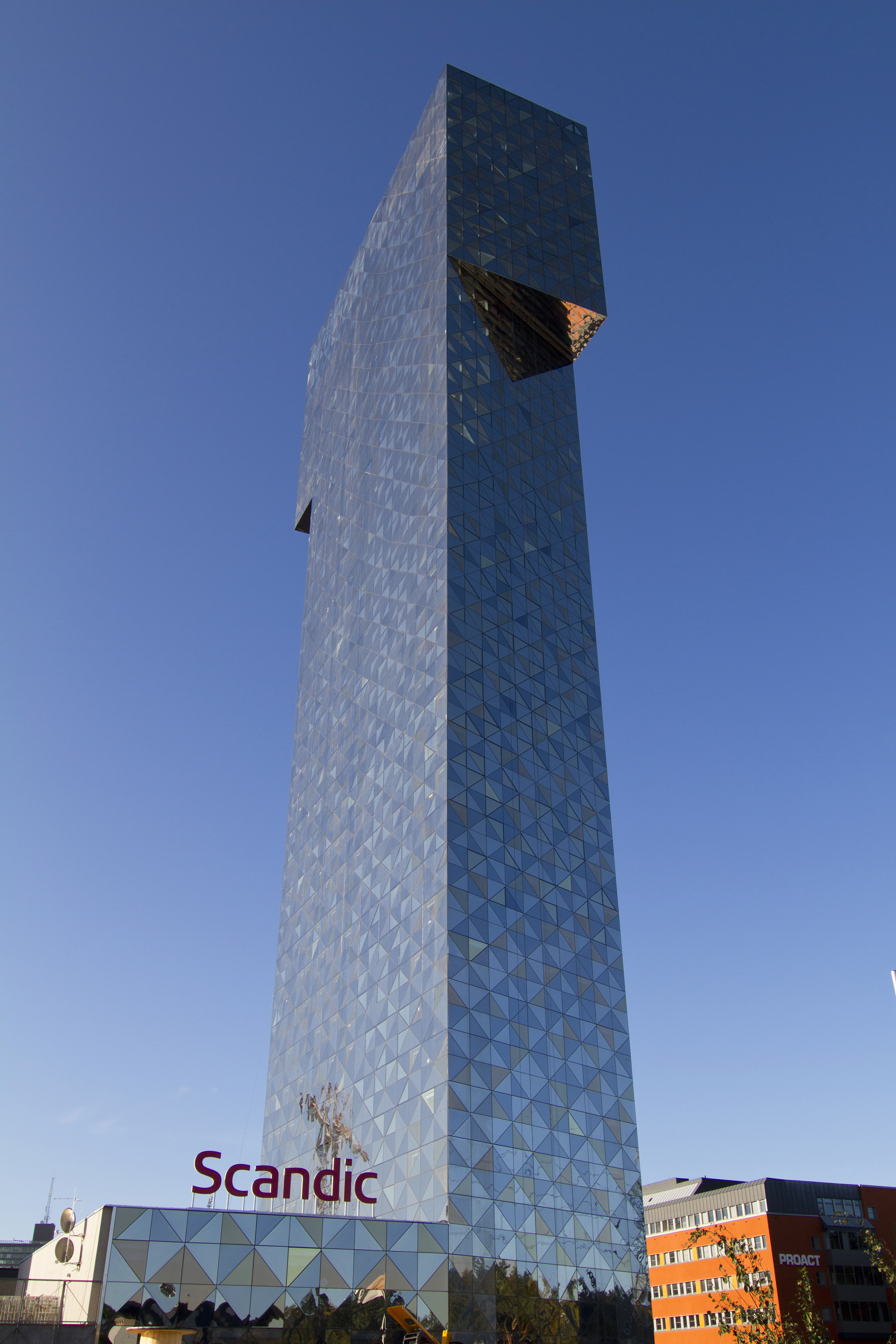
Victoria Tower in Kista

Kista (Swedish pronunciation: [ˈɕǐːsta]) is a district in the borough of Rinkeby-Kista, Stockholm, Sweden. It has a strategic position located in between Sweden's main airport, the Stockholm-Arlanda International Airport and central Stockholm, and alongside the main national highway E4 economic artery.

Kista comprises residential and commercial areas, the latter in the highly technological telecommunications and information technology industry. There are large research efforts in this entire area, which therefore is dubbed Kista Science City. It is the research park of KTH Royal Institute of Technology.

Kista Science City is the location where a large portion of the research and development of the world's 4G LTE mobile telephony infrastructure is being developed, to a European ETSI standard used worldwide. A majority is done at Ericsson, with 100,000 employees worldwide, but with its research and worldwide headquarters in the Kista Science City.

Kista was named after an old farm "Kista Gård", still located in the area. The construction of the modern parts were started in the 1970s. Most of the streets in Kista are named after towns and places in Denmark, Iceland, Greenland, and the Faroe Islands. Before the opening of the Mall of Scandinavia, Kista Galleria was the biggest shopping center in the Stockholm region. Because of its ICT industries, it became in the 1980s referred to as "Chipsta" and, after Sweden joined the EU in 1995, also as Europe's "Silicon Valley".

== Overview ==
=== Etymology ===
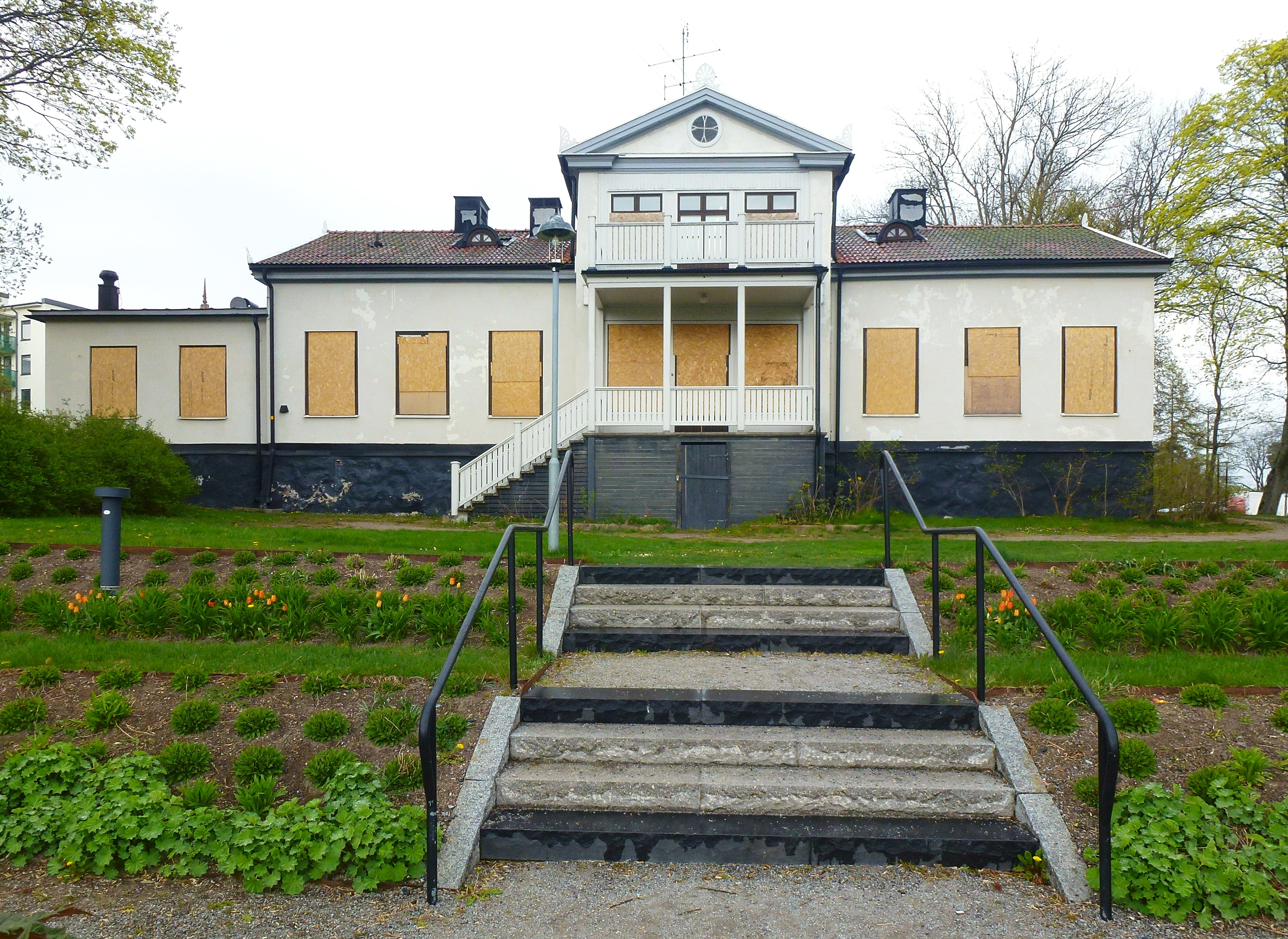
Main building of Kista Gård, a farmhouse that Kista is named after

Kista got its name sometime in during 1600s and was named after a farmhouse in this area. The word Kista historically meant "place where livestock is traded", from the Old Swedish word "kvi", meaning livestock, and "sta(d)", meaning place.

=== Economy ===
Kista is the largest corporate area in Sweden and important to the national economy. The construction of the industrial section of Kista began in the 1970s with companies such as SRA (Svenska Radioaktiebolaget, now a part of Ericsson), RIFA AB (later Ericsson Components AB, and later still Ericsson Microelectronics AB, and now Infineon Technologies), and IBM Svenska AB (the Swedish branch of IBM). Ericsson has had its headquarters in Kista since 2003. Cellmax is another local company founded and headquartered in Kista.

Kista is the largest Information and Communications Technology (ICT) cluster in Europe, and was ranked the world's second largest cluster after Silicon Valley in California during the internet boom of 2000. It is the largest corporate area in Sweden, important to the national economy due to the presence of, among others, Ericsson, one of the largest corporations in Sweden.

=== Safety ===
In the 2020s, Kista was classified as a vulnerable area by the Swedish Police Authority.

Some companies that used to define Kista have left the area. The Kista neighborhood has seen incidents of robberies, stabbings, shootings, attempted murders and murders.

Swedish branch of IBM and Ericsson, two of the biggest employers in the area, both departed in the mid-2020s. Fujitsu, Coor Service Management, KTH Royal Institute of Technology as well as other organizations also left the area; however, KTH cited cost reduction, not safety as their justification. Relocations include public institutions, e.g. the local police station moved from Kista to Solna. In the mid-2020s, more than a third of office space in Kista was vacant. Various retailers have also relocated from Kista. There are several ongoing initiatives to improve safety in Kista.

== Research and higher learning ==
Kista hosts entire departments of both KTH Royal Institute of Technology, such as Wireless@KTH, and Stockholm University (formerly jointly known as "the IT University").

There are also Swedish national research institutes (pure research, no students) such as the Swedish Institute of Computer Science and Swedish Defence Research Agency, FOI who has its headquarters there, just as Ericsson, Swedish IBM and Tele 2, among others has.

Also the Swedish Co-location Centre of EU innovation and entrepreneurial education organisation EIT Digital is located in Kista and offers a 2-year Master program in collaboration with KTH Royal Institute of Technology.

== Parks and open spaces ==
Kista does not have any large and notable parks, but it has many green areas. According to statistics from Stockholm Municipality, each person in Kista has on average 94 square meters of green spaces within 500 meter radius.

== Gallery ==
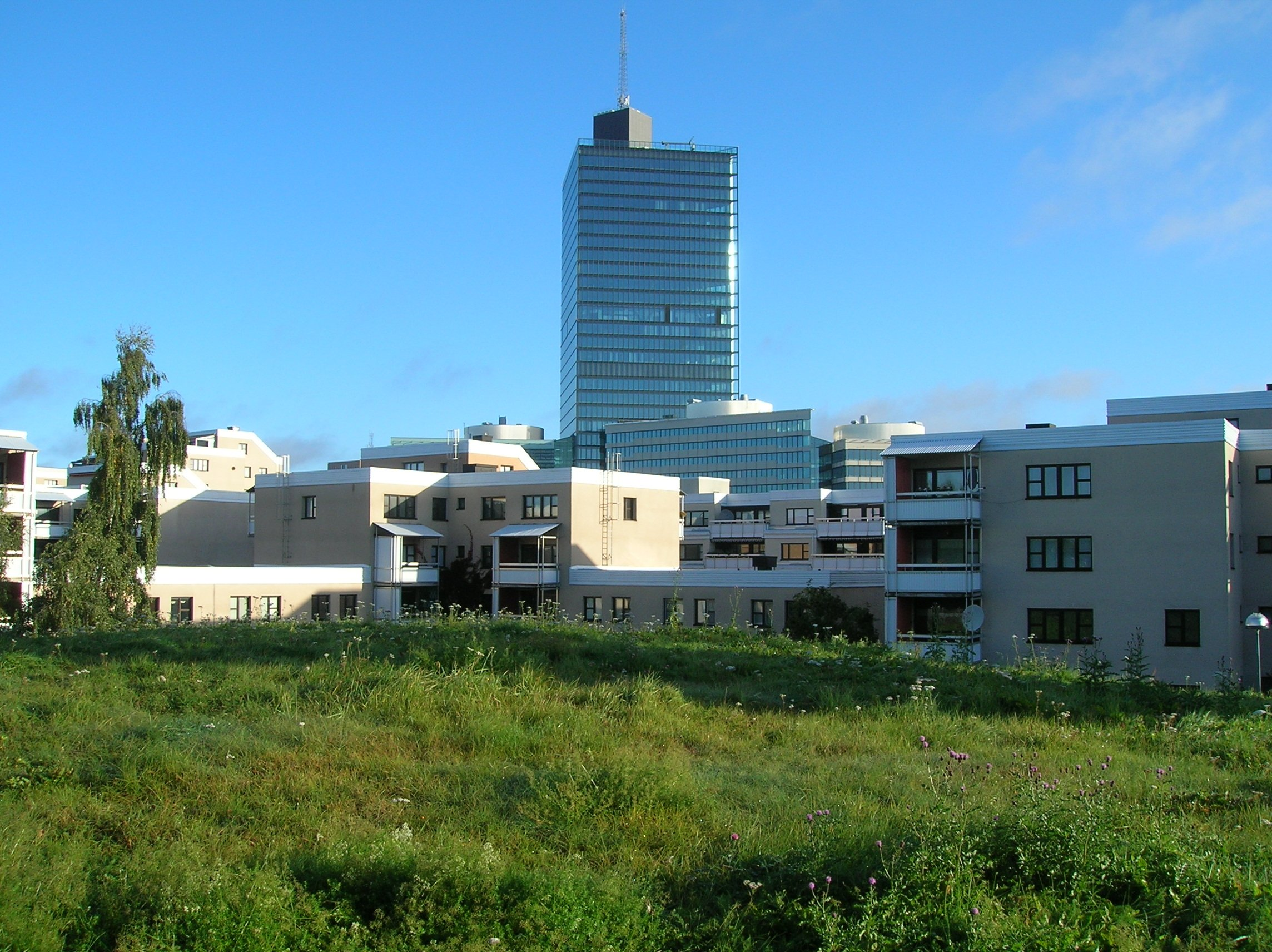

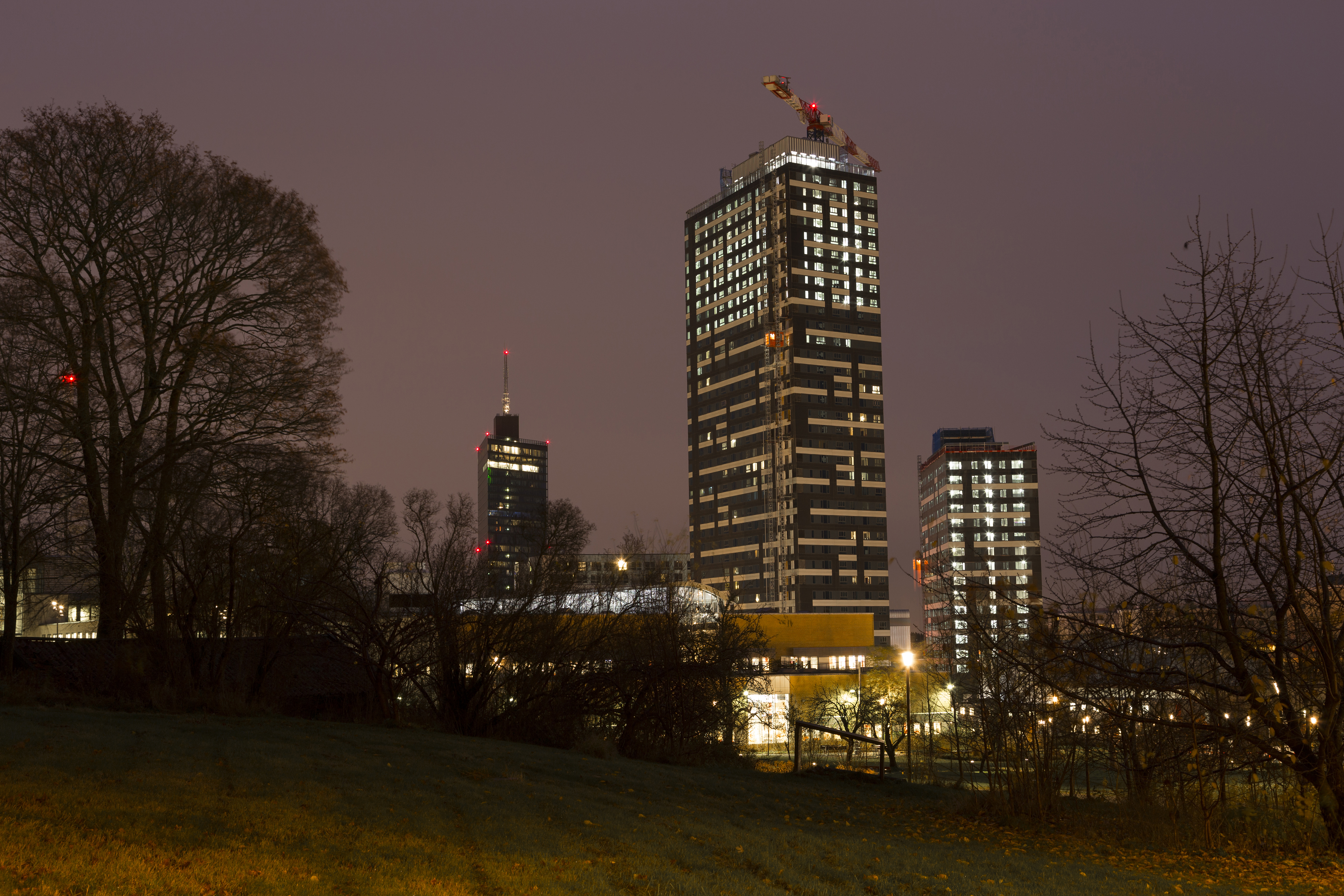

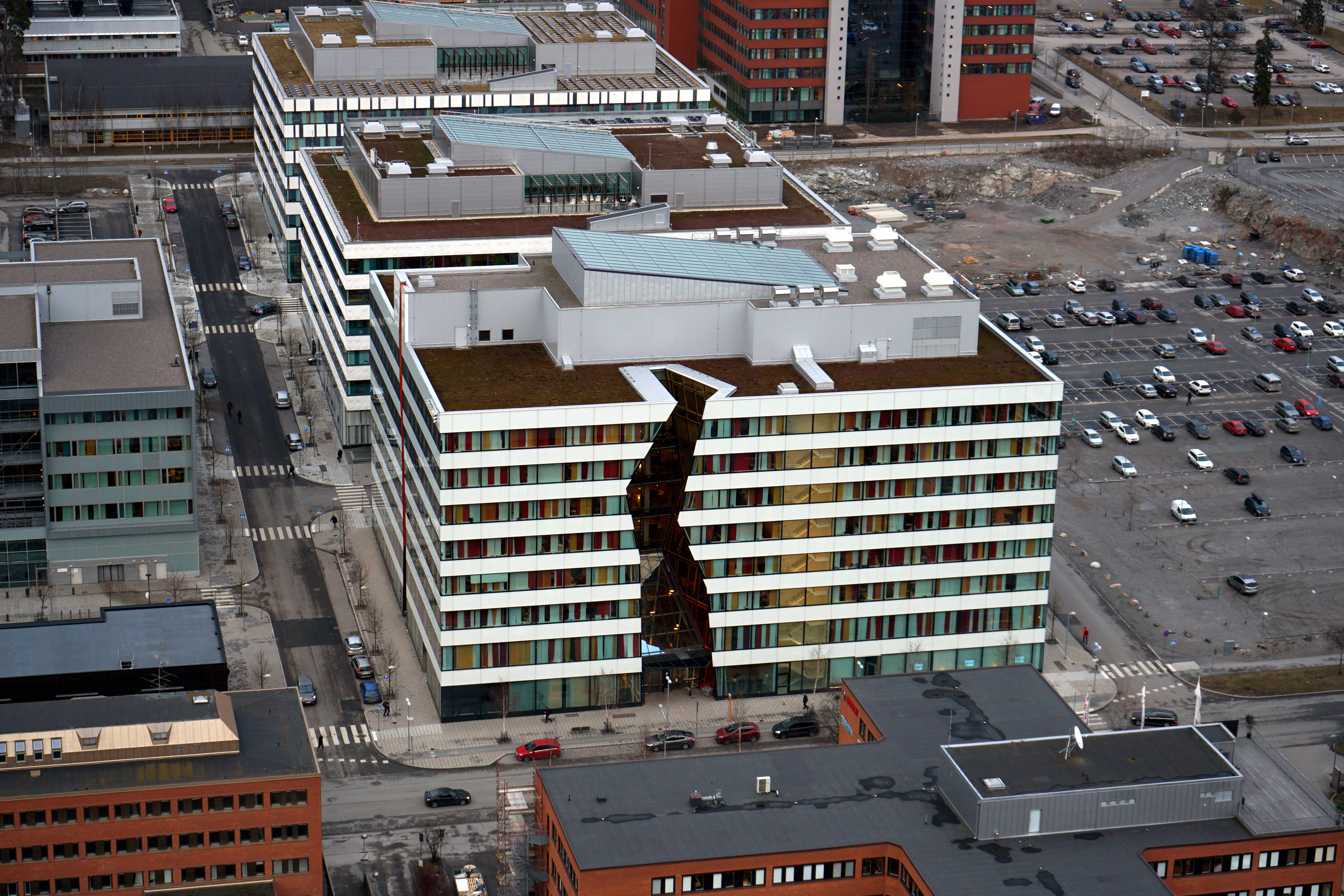

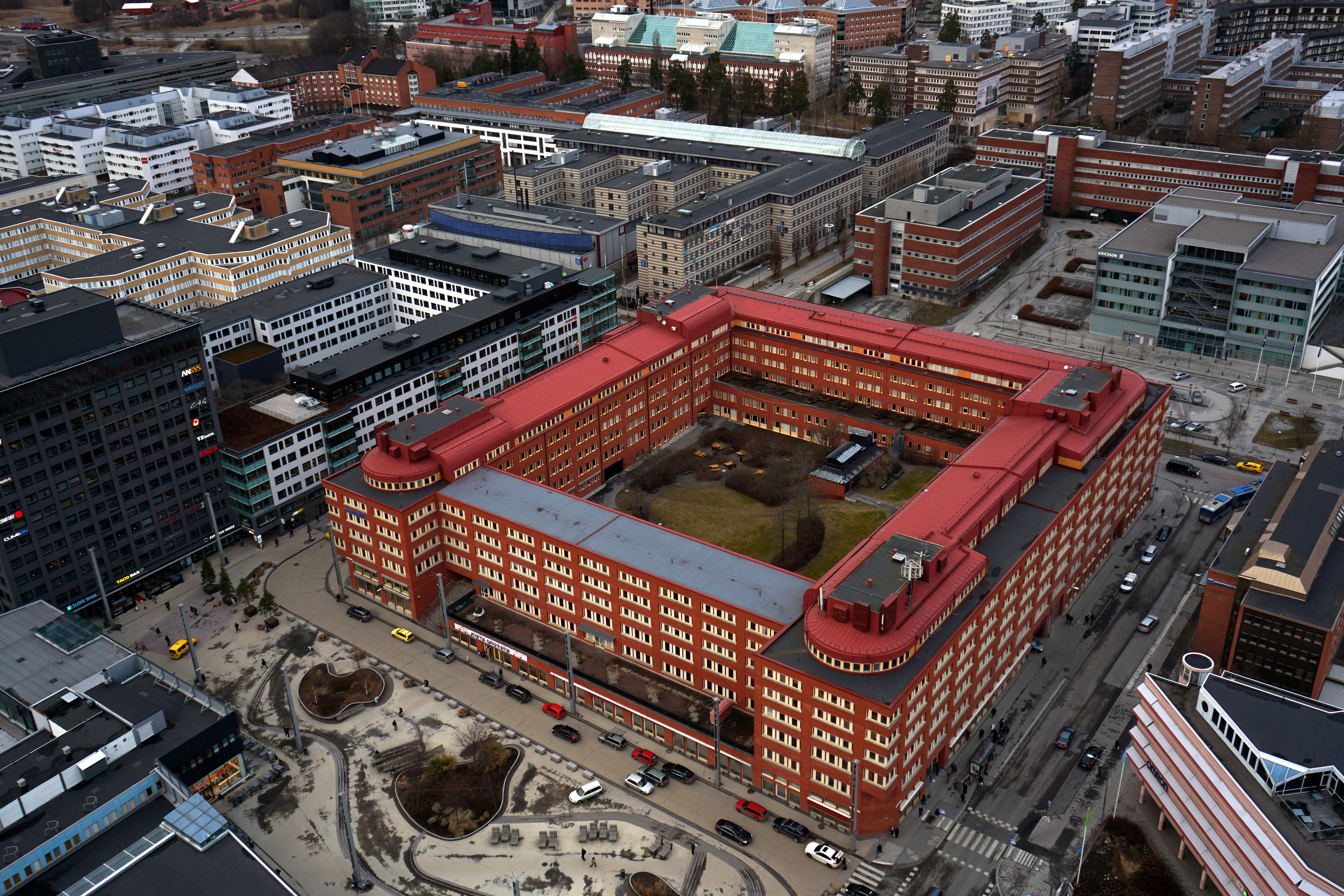

== See also ==
- Kista Science Tower
- Kista metro station
