= Ericpol =

Polish information technology company

Ericsson sp. z. o. o.
- Company type: Publicly traded Spółka z ograniczoną odpowiedzialnością
- Industry: Telecommunications equipment Networking equipment
- Predecessor: Ericpol sp. z. o. o., Łódź, Poland
- Founded: Warsaw, Poland (1991; 35 years ago)
- Headquarters: Warsaw, Poland
- Area served: Poland, Ukraine
- Key people: Pawel Szczerkowski (CEO for Poland), Orest Kossak (CEO for Ukraine)
- Products: Telecommunications software
- Number of employees: ~2,400
- Website: www.ericsson.com/en/about-us/company-facts/ericsson-worldwide/poland

Ericpol (formerly Ericpol Telecom) is a Polish company operating in IT field. It specialises in the production and development of software for telecommunication and M2M, as well as enterprises that base their activities on modern technologies. The headquarters is in Łódź, branch offices in Kraków and Warsaw and the company has subsidiaries in Sweden (Linköping), Ukraine (Lviv) and Belarus (Brest). The Ericpol Group employs 1,790 people (in 2012).

== History and development ==
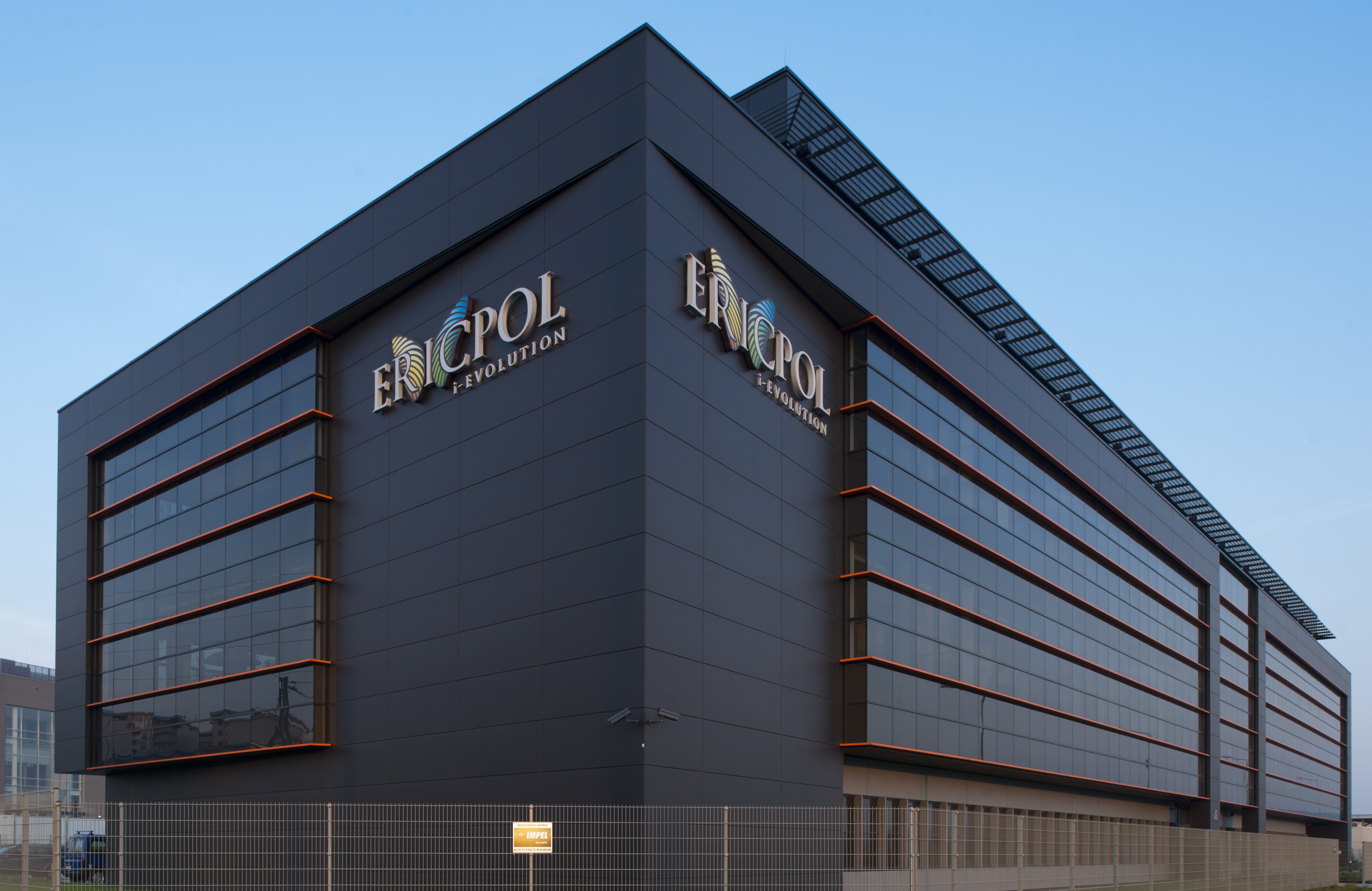
Ericpol office in Kraków

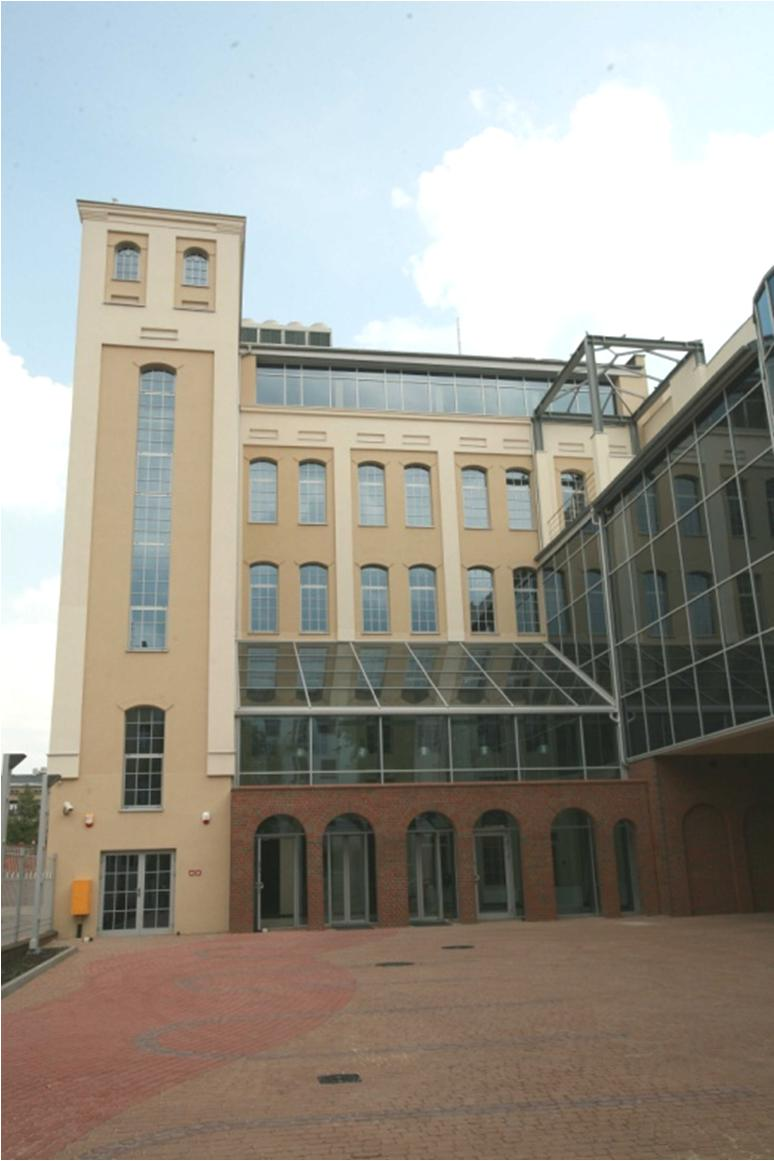
Ericpol office in Łódź

Ericsson Sp. z. o. o. was founded as Ericpol Telecom Sp. z. o. o. in 1991 in Łódź. The first assignment consisted of testing telephone exchange monitoring software for Ericsson. Two years later, Ericpol's employees begun to participate in projects run by Ericsson's R&D departments outside of Poland. In 1996, the second office was established in Kraków, and in 1998 the total number of staff exceeded one hundred. In 2004, Ericpol set up the first foreign branch offices in Linköping, Sweden and Lviv, Ukraine. In 2005, the company was awarded with "Leader of Modern Technologies". In 2007 a new subsidiary in Brest, Belarus was opened. A year later "Teraz Polska" emblem was awarded to Ericpol. In 2010, a new, modern office in Kraków (in Kraków Technology Park located in a special economic zone) was opened.

Today(?), Ericpol offices in Poland, Sweden, Ukraine and Belarus employ a staff of 1790, including more than 1300 engineers.

In Łódź, the company purchased an old factory building (erected in the early 20th century) which was later revitalized and adapted into office space. The newly restored building was nominated to "The Best Interior of the Year 2008". In Kraków, Ericpol also acquired a tenement house on the Vistula river in the vicinity of Wawel Castle. The quality of the renovation works gained it a nomination for the Janusz Bogdanowski Award. In 2010, Ericpol Kraków moved to a new business office in Kraków Technology Park, located in a special economic zone, giving 500 places of employment.

In April 2016, Ericsson acquired Ericpol, with about 2300 employees in the field of radio, IP and cloud computing technologies.

In February 2017, the company was renamed to Ericsson Sp. z. o. o.

== Main areas of business ==
- Dedicated IT and applications
- IT Outsourcing
- IT Consulting
- Customizations
- Trainings

Ericpol specializes in five segments:

- Telecommunications (services of designing, maintenance and testing of software for hardware and software manufacturers all over the world; consultancy and training services).
- M2M - Machine to Machine (engineering services – mainly in the area of designing and testing embedded systems software, which are used by the leading manufacturers in the car industry, i.e. Peugeot and Citroen). In 2010 Ericpol became a core member of GENIVI Alliance.
- Healthcare (specialist software packet “Dr Eryk” for managing doctor’s surgeries and outpatient clinics and ErLab - a communication system between medical centres and cooperating laboratories), In 2008 “Dr Eryk” got “Teraz Polska” emblem in the category of products and services.
- ERP and Business Intelligence applications (applications for effective business management applied in the industry, broadly understood trade and production management).
- Finances and Banking (Enterprise Management Support Systems, Sales Support Software, Debt recovery support, Advanced integration services based on data buses (ESB) and process engines (BPM), Video-teleconferencing systems, B2B portal, Data and document processing based on cloud).

== Ericpol Science Ecosystem ==
Ericpol regularly cooperates with the Technical University of Łódź, the Jagiellonian University, the University of Łódź and the AGH University of Science and Technology in Kraków. The company actively participates in the didactic process of the students of telecommunications, applied mathematics and computer science through lectures and seminars conducted by Ericpol’s specialists.
