= HP Utility Data Center =

The Utility Data Center, or UDC, was a product of Hewlett-Packard. It was the first attempt to sell a private cloud. It featured a graphical interface that allowed the user to construct a server "farm", including servers, OS provisioning, networking, firewalls, load balancers, and storage.

The product began in 2002 as an intellectual property acquisition, from a small services vendor, Terraspring, that had used the product to manage their own data center. Originally termed project slinky, it was largely based out of the Fort Collins campus, and spent the first few releases porting the original solution from a stack based upon Oracle Solaris, Cisco switches, and WebSphere, to one based on HP-UX, HP Procurve, and Bluestone's Application server. Then the team spent considerable effort improving reliability, improving security, and creating packaging, procedures and documentation to make the solution salable as a product.

HP was on its second beta release when Sun Microsystems acquired Terraspring entirely, forming the basis for the Sun N1 Grid Engine.

The project was notable, in that it was a private cloud offering, based not on the manipulation of VMs, but the allocation of bare-metal servers contained in racks. The storage was distributed to the servers via SAN Brocade switches and the manipulation of the switches via a Java-based application that commanded the infrastructure out of band, largely with SNMP.

The farms were internally represented in an XML called FML (Farm Markup language), and enacted via a Java-based engine that managed provisioning, complete with safe "clean-room" networks for safe disk wipe and load between customer allocations, and one of the first uses of SAN gateway to act as a sort of "SAN firewall" to limit WWN spoofing, that at the time, was less well understood in SANs than the equivalent LAN spoofing. Internal discussions at the time were the inspiration for what later became the introduction of Brocade's "Secure Fabric OS" – the first SAN switch to introduce the notion of WWN authentication.

Though the product did see three major deployments, the project was canceled on September 27, 2004. Opinions differ on the exact reasons, but there are three likely factors: 1) The $1 million base price for the smallest UDC: a single resource rack, a single XP 128, and a single management rack. 2) The loss of first-mover advantage spending so much time stabilizing the product, and porting to the HP hardware/software ecosystem. 3) When the "dotcom bubble bursting" reached its highest point, a significant portion of the target market segment (ISPs and IDCs) for UDC went bankrupt.
