= Norwegian Telecom Museum =

Norwegian museum

Coordinates: 59°57′58″N 10°47′00″E

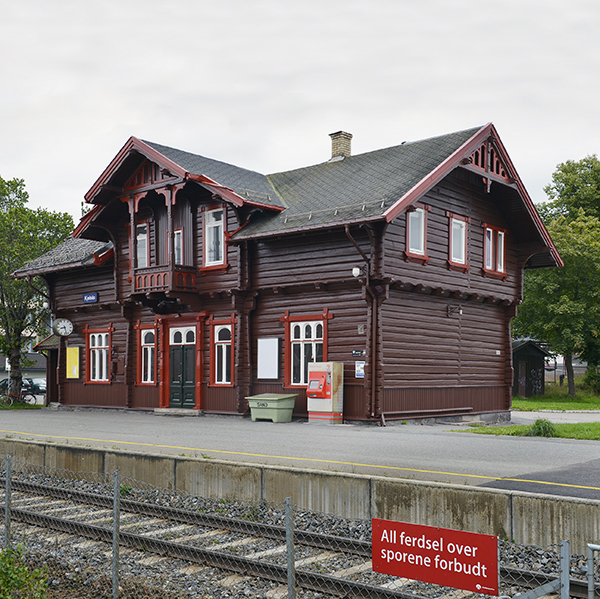
Norwegian Telecom Museum administration at Kjelsås in Oslo. (Housed in former Kjelsås railway station)

The Norwegian Telecom Museum (Telemuseet, formerly Norsk Telemuseum) was a Norwegian museum with a collection and several exhibits, including a permanent exhibit at the Norwegian Museum of Science and Technology. The administration of the Norwegian Telecom Museum was maintained in the Kjelsås neighbourhoods of Oslo.

== History ==
The museum operated nationwide, with exhibitions and collections in several places. The main exhibition of the museum was located in the Norwegian Museum of Science and Technology at Kjelsås in Oslo. Other location sites include Stavanger, Jeløya, Kristiansand. Lier, Lærdal, Lødingen, Sørvågen, Tromsø and Trondheim.

In 1906, Norway's second wireless telephone station was established in Sørvågen making it an important location for telecommunications in the country. The museum in Sørvågen was housed in the old telegraph station which dates back to 1914. A museum was opened there in 1996. The theme of the museum was "Cod, telegraph and telephone", as due to its coastal location, the area has links with the fishing industry as well as radio.

The museum was mainly funded by the Telenor Group. In April 2017, Telenor announced that it would no longer finance the operation of the museum, which would be closed from January 2018. Applications were made for operating funds from the State, but in the state budget for 2018 no money was set aside for the Telemuseet. The museum was therefore merged with the Norwegian Museum of Science and Technology with effect from 1 January 2018.
