= Ericsson R310s =

Mobile phone model

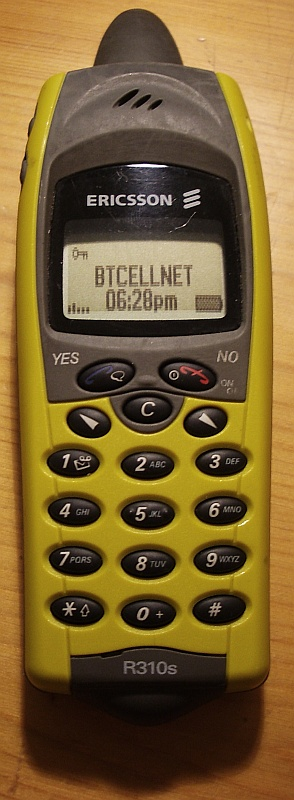
- First released: 2000; 26 years ago
- Compatible networks: GSM 900/1800
- Dimensions: 131×53×25 mm (5.16×2.09×0.98 in)
- Weight: 173 g (6 oz)
- Display: Monochrome bitmap

The Ericsson R310s, produced by Ericsson Mobile Communications, now known as Sony Mobile, was a mobile phone produced in the early 2000s, designed for use in environments which might easily damage a standard handset.

Björn Andersson was the development lead, and the device had the internal working name of "Marina". Development work began in 1997 and went on for around two-and-a-half years before the product launch in 2000.

The outside of the body is reinforced with rubber inlays to withstand harsh treatment and to provide a good grip, preventing the phone from being slippery when wet.

It is water-resistant, the lid having silicone gaskets and Gore-Tex membranes which prevented water from leaking in.

At the time the R310s was designed, most handsets still had a vulnerable external antenna. The R310s had a so-called "shark fin" antenna which was short and almost flat, and could withstand flexing.

The software was similar to that in other Ericsson phones of the period and the package offered voice dialing, vibrating call alert, and data/fax capabilities.

Aimed at "active lifestyle" users as well as tradespeople and industry, the phone was available in both high-visibility and fashion colours: bright orange, bright yellow, blue and green.

The phone survived slightly longer than others launched at the same time due to the lack of a replacement model.
