= Ericsson T66 =

2001 mobile phone

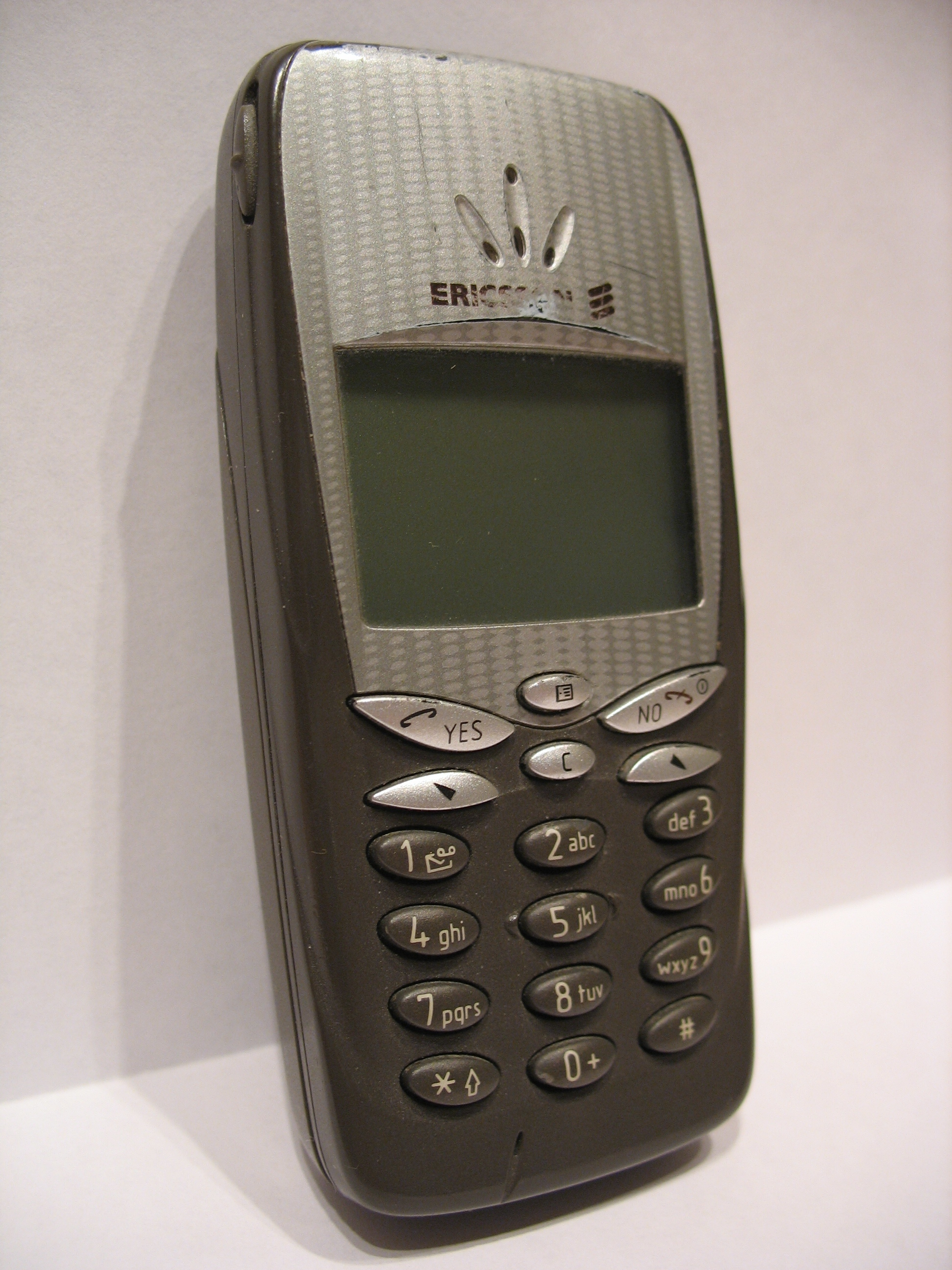
- Compatible networks: GSM 900/1800/1900
- Form factor: Candybar
- Dimensions: 92 x 41 x 17.5 mm (3.6 x 1.6 x 0.7 inches)
- Weight: 59 g (2.1 oz)
- Battery: Li-ion
- Display: 101x65 pixels, monochrome

Ericsson T66 is a discontinued mobile phone created by Ericsson Mobile Communications, their smallest ever. Released in September 2001, it surpassed the tiny Nokia 8210 in smallness and weight at the time. At just 59 grams, it remains as one of the lightest mobile phones ever released.

The T66 is compatible with GSM 900/1800/1900 mobile phone networks.

After Ericsson merged with Sony Corporation in 2001 to create Sony Ericsson, the T66's body, and color were changed in a new model called Sony Ericsson T600 in 2002.
