= Reimersholmsbron =

Bridge in central Stockholm, Sweden

Coordinates: 59°19′6.64″N 18°1′33.79″E

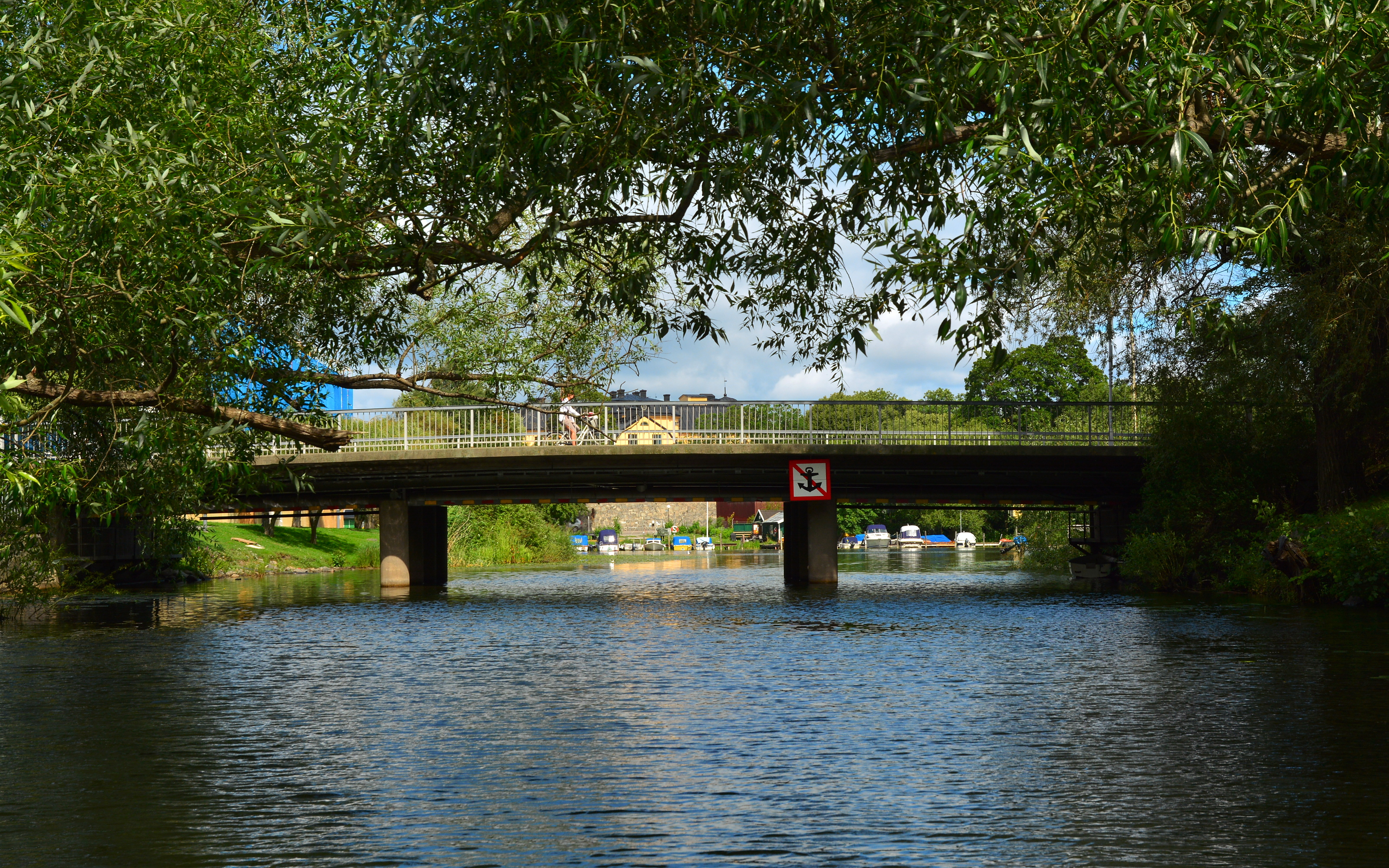
Reimersholmsbron in July 2015

Reimersholmsbron or Reimersbron (Swedish: "The Reimer Islet Bridge") is a bridge in central Stockholm, Sweden, connecting the major island Södermalm to the minor island Reimersholme.

The first bridge passing over to Reimersholme is present on a map dated 1819. It is said to have been built by lieutenant general Johan August Sandel in preparation for a visit by Charles XIV. The present bridge was built 1942–43.

In contrast to Långholmsbron, the bridge leading over to Långholmen where the Långholmen prison was once located and popularly referred to as Suckarnas bro ("The Bridge of Sighs"), Reimersholmsbron, which once led to an island which was home to a major distillery, was called Kluckarnas bro ("The Bridge of Clucks").

== See also ==
- List of bridges in Stockholm
- Långholmsbron
- Pålsundsbron
- Västerbron
