= Västerbroplan =

Road intersection in Kungsholmen, Stockholm, Sweden

Coordinates: 59°19′41″N 18°01′17″E

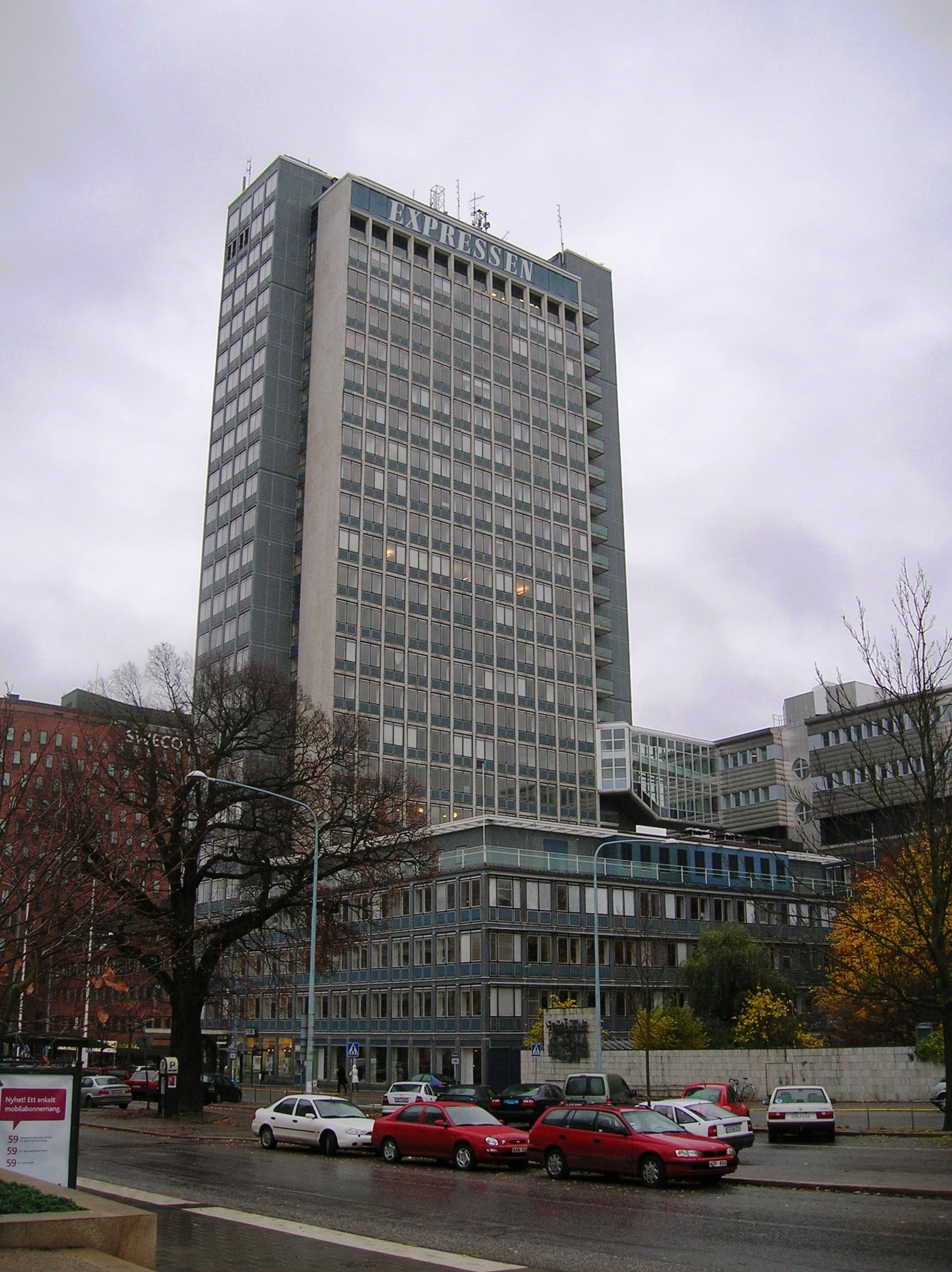
The DN building (aka DN-skrapan in Swedish) in Stockholm, the former site of Dagens Nyheter

Västerbroplan is a traffic intersection in Kungsholmen, Stockholm. It lies just west of Västerbron and just south of Fridhemsplan. It is also the location of DN-Skrapan, the offices of several newspapers and associated agencies.

While its namesake, Dagens Nyheter, no longer resides in the building, it is still very much associated with press and journalism.

== Nearby locations ==
In the complex there is also a large grocery store, a pharmacy, systembolaget and offices of the Social Services. It connects to Fridhemsplan and central Stockholm via a bridge spanning over Rålambshovsparken; to Essingeöarna via Mariebergsbron; and to Södermalm via Västerbron. Between Västerbroplan and Fridhemsplan lies Rålambshovsparken.

Rålambshovsvägen spans from Kristineberg through Västerbroplan and onwards to Västerbron. Along it lies numerous blocks of flats built in the 1970-1980s. A parallel street, Gjörwellsgatan, runs from Mariebergsbron and connects into the intersection.

== Bus routes ==
Bus routes 1 and 62 run from Västerbroplan into central Stockholm and onwards, while bus route 4 goes to Södermalm via Västerbron, and bus route 49 takes a few passengers further into the western suburbs.
