= Västerbron =

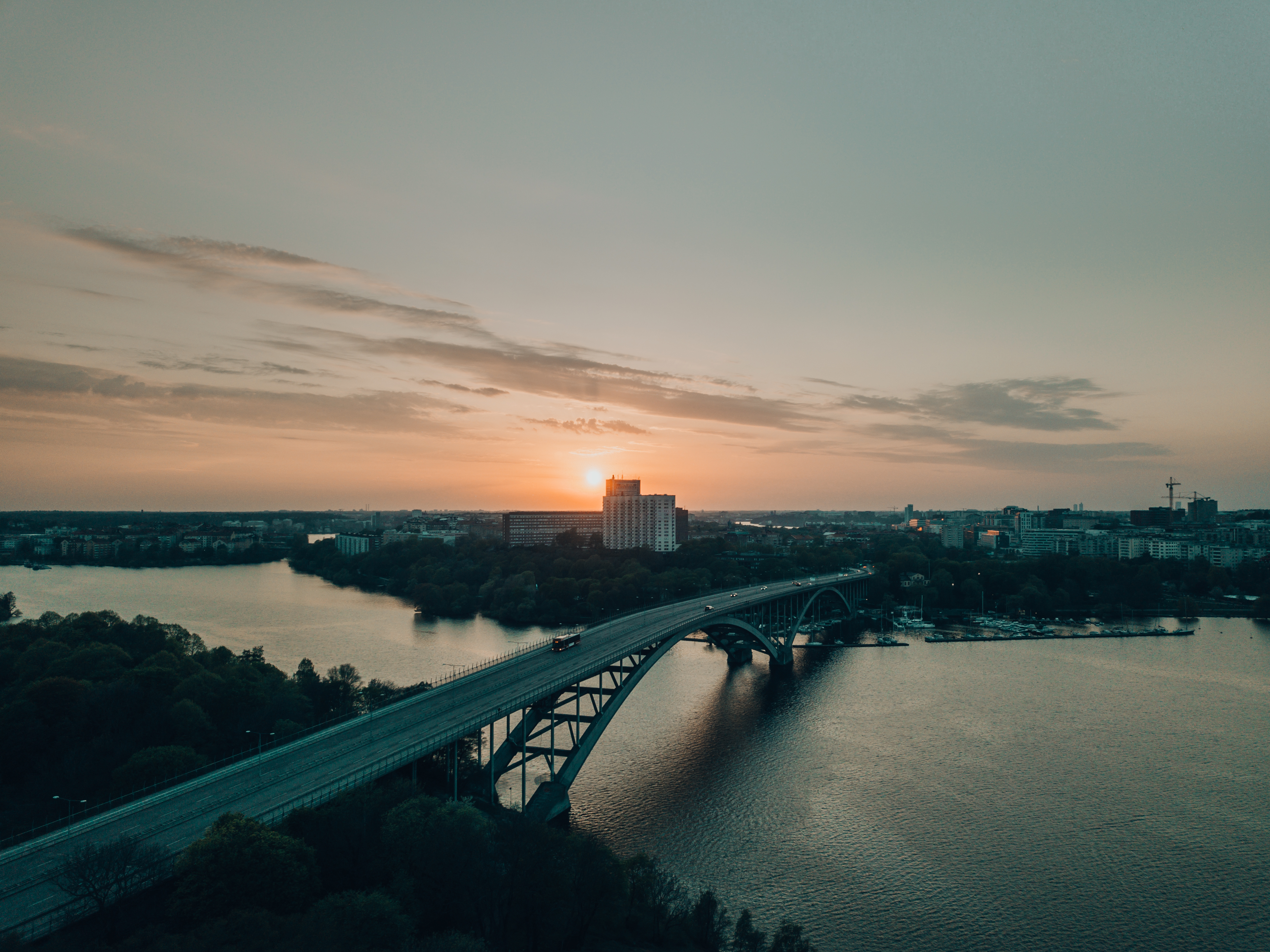
- Coordinates: 59°19′28″N 18°01′38″E
- Carries: Motor vehicles, bicycles, pedestrians
- Crosses: Riddarfjärden
- Locale: Stockholm, Sweden
- Begins: Kungsholmen
- Ends: Södermalm

Characteristics
- Design: Arch bridge
- Material: Steel
- Total length: 602 m (1,975 ft)
- Longest span: 204 m (669 ft)
- No. of spans: 2
- Clearance below: 26 m (85 ft)

History
- Architect: Birger Borgström, David Dahl, Paul Hedqvist
- Successful competition design: Otto Rudolf Salvisberg; Wilhelm Büning; Wilhelm Maelzer
- Constructed by: Salomon Kasarnowsky, E. Nilsson
- Fabrication by: Dortmunder Union, Motala Verkstad
- Construction start: 1931
- Construction end: 1935
- Inaugurated: 20 November 1935

Västerbron (lit. 'the western bridge') is an arch bridge in central Stockholm, Sweden. With a total length exceeding 600 m, 340 m of which stretches over water, it is one of the major bridges in Stockholm, offering one of the most panoramic views of the central part of the city centering on Gamla Stan, the old town.

Its inauguration on 20 November 1935 made it the second stationary connection between the southern and northern parts of the city, saving the citizens the effort of a ferry ride, which had previously been required, or the congested detour through Gamla Stan.

== Sections ==
Västerbron can be said to consist of three sections:

- Västerbron over Riddarfjärden – with two spans stretching over Riddarfjärden.
- Västerbron over Pålsundet – a simple arch bridge stretching over Pålsundet.
- Västerbron over Rålambshovsparken – a girderless floor construction stretching from Västerbroplan over Rålambshovsparken to Drottningholmsvägen near Fridhemsplan.

=== Västerbron over Riddarfjärden ===
This is the section most Stockholmers would call "Västerbron proper". It consists of two arches together encompassing slightly more than 600 m, including the viaducts in either side. The southern arch next to Långholmen has a span of 204 m and, stretching over the navigable passage underneath, a vertical clearance of 26 m. The northern arch is smaller, with a span of 168 m. This section is 24 m wide with a 19-metre-wide (62 ft) roadway flanked by 2.5-metre-wide (8.2 ft) pavements, dimensions applying to the other sections as well.

=== Västerbron over Pålsundet ===
Previously known as Pålsundsbron, this section stretches over 276 m, including viaducts, forming the southern arch leading over Pålsundet from Södermalm to Långholmen. It was built at the same time as Västerbron over Riddarfjärden and forms a continuous structure with it, both bridges having the same width and being made entirely in steel. It was the first major bridge in Sweden with a welded steel superstructure.

Two much smaller bridges allow cars and pedestrians to reach Långholmen, where the former Långholmen prison area have been transformed into a popular recreational area. The space under the bridge is being used for parked trailers in summer, while acting as winter quarters for boats during the dark season.

=== Västerbron over Rålambshovsparken ===
With its west-eastern direction, this section stretches some 243 m over the parc Rålambshovsparken from the roundabout at Västerbroplan to Drottningholmsvägen, the major traffic route leading to the western suburbs. Originally this section was suggested as an embankment cutting the park in two with only a small bridge leading over Rålambshovsleden below. Because of the poor carrying capacity of the soil, the embankment plans were substituted by the present concrete structure, a girderless slab carried by pillars.

== History ==
The first proposal for a bridge connecting Kungsholmen with Långholmen was made in 1903 when plans to relocate the main northern railway passing through Stockholm to the west of the central city were discussed. The proposal mainly focused on a railway bridge however and, as the traffic in Stockholm at the time hardly could motivate a bridge of such dimensions, proposing a road-rail bridge was probably meant to emphasize the technical feasibility of such a bridge. The project was included in a proposal in 1905 but was not mentioned again before the 1920s.

The relocation of the railway was finally brought up again and in 1925 three alternative designs for a road-rail bridge were produced, with a street bridge passing alternatively to the east, to the west, or above the railway.

While most agreed the southern part of the bridge should connect with Långholmsgatan on Södermalm passing over Långholmen, the connection to Kungsholmen gave several possibilities. Before finally settling the present location with the northern end of the bridge landing on Rålambshovsparken, two other alternatives were considered; One further west, between Långholmen and Smedsudden, the shortest distance over Riddarfjärden, and one to the east, connecting the bridge directly to Sankt Eriksgatan much further north.

A sunken rock north of the navigable course in Riddarfjärden, appropriate for a bridge foundation, finally convinced the city council to commission the port authorities to launch an international competition for a bridge passing over the rock. The competition produced no less than 72 different designs, including arch bridges, girder bridges, and cable bridges. The winner of the competition in 1930 was the German team of the architects Otto Rudolf Salvisberg, Wilhelm Büning and Wilhelm Maelzer. The final design was approved by the city in 1931.

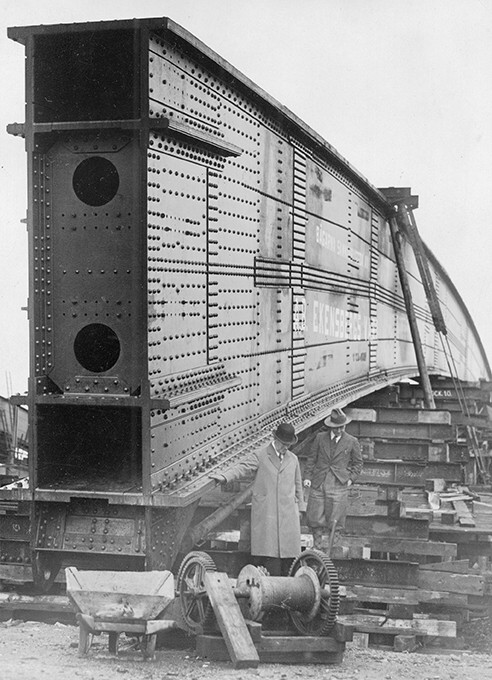
Steel beam for Västerbron in Stockholm, manufactured by Ekensberg's shipyard in 1933. Engineers Pirra and Jacoby examining the machinery.

Västerbron was built simultaneously to the then modern traffic centre at Slussen and while the bridge was being built many people were wondering who was supposed to use it, believing its peripheral situation would prevent it from attracting any users. However, after only a year more than 12,000 cars used the bridge daily and before 1955 that number had increased fourfold, effectively using up all the capacity the bridge could offer. In 1955–56 the bridge was broadened 2 m, giving space for new bicycle lanes.

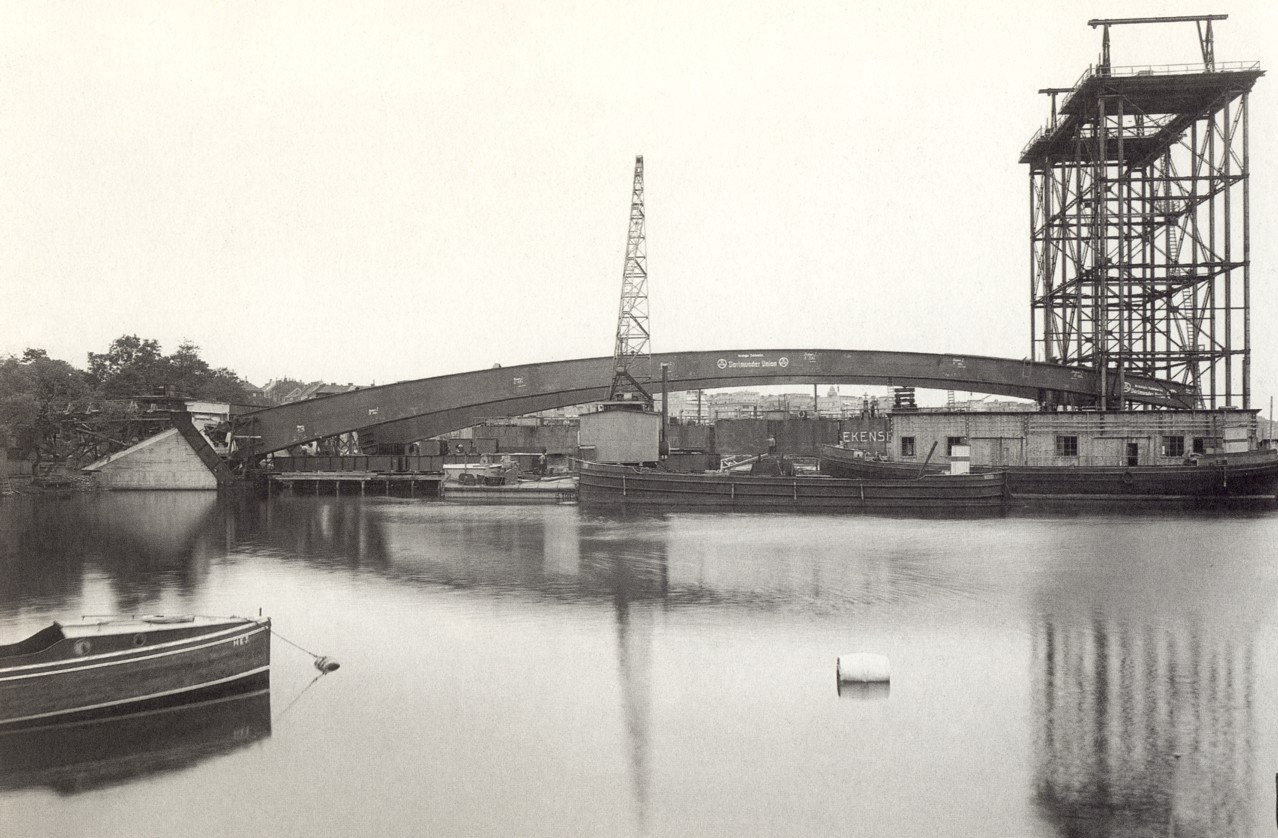
Västerbron during construction 1933.

The increasing traffic following WWII continued to strain the capacity of Västerbron. Much of the north-southern traffic flow through the old city centre remained confined to the bridge until the inauguration in 1966 of Essingeleden, the motorway running parallel to Västerbron about 1.5 km to the west. Today, Västerbron is occasionally still acting as a reserve when Essingeleden is being closed off for repair and other reasons. From its opening Västerbron was an important passageway of Stockholm’s tram network until the last four lines of the network, one of them line 4 crossed over Västerbron, was closed in September 1967 simultaneously with the switch to right-hand side traffic.

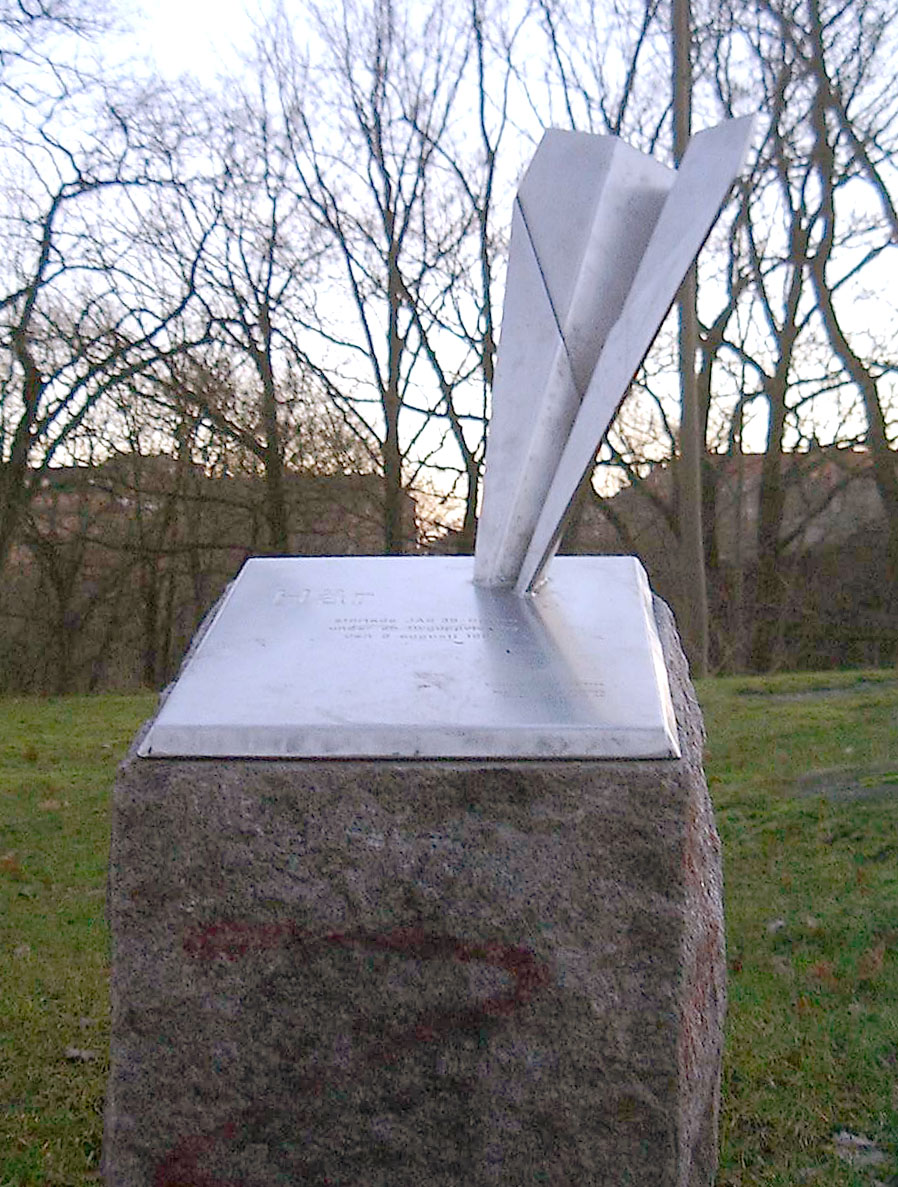
The JAS monument next to Västerbron.

In August 1993 a JAS 39 Gripen fighter aircraft crashed on Långholmen only a few meters from the bridge after a low altitude, low speed manoeuvre during an air show. The pilot ejected safely and only one person on the ground was injured, despite tens of thousands of people standing by watching. Today a small, sculpture on the site of the crash, a paper plane with its nose drilled into the soil, is commemorating the event. As a result of the accident, today air shows are forbidden over Riddarfjärden and no aircraft are allowed to pass under the bridge.

As of 2006 a dozen workers have been working for several years to treat the bridge against corrosive attacks.

== In popular culture ==
Published simultaneously to the inauguration, the novel Människor kring en bro ("People round a bridge") by the proletarian author Josef Kjellgren (1907–1948) gave a detailed account of the life of the workers who took part in the construction of the bridge.

The singer and actress Monica Zetterlund (1937–2005) mentions the bridge in one of her major hits Sakta vi gå genom stan (Swedish cover of Walking My Baby Back Home) in the now famous lyrics written by Beppe Wolgers: På Västerbron, i den himmelska ron, en spårvagn går ensam och tom. ("On Västerbron, in the heavenly peace, a tram passes lonely and vacant.").

Other examples of the bridge in popular culture include:

- Johan Dufour composed the piano piece Västerbron in 1989 while living at Kungsholmen.
- Stockholm-based indie-band Laakso_(band) lament a lost love on the bridge in their 2007 song bearing its name.
- During the annual Stockholm Marathon, the passage over Västerbron is known as one of the most exciting during the two laps around Stockholm. It is also the place where many choose to encourage friends and relatives participating in the run.
- The view over Riddarfjärden makes the bridge a very popular spot for watching the New Year's Eve fireworks.
- In March 2008, Anders Göthberg, guitarist in the Swedish cult indie band Broder Daniel committed suicide by jumping off the bridge.
- The Swedish Alternative Rock band Kent filmed parts of the music video for their breakthrough single Kräm (så nära får ingen gå) on Västerbron in 1996. In 2007, Västerbron was pictured on the cover of their album Tillbaka till samtiden

== Gallery ==
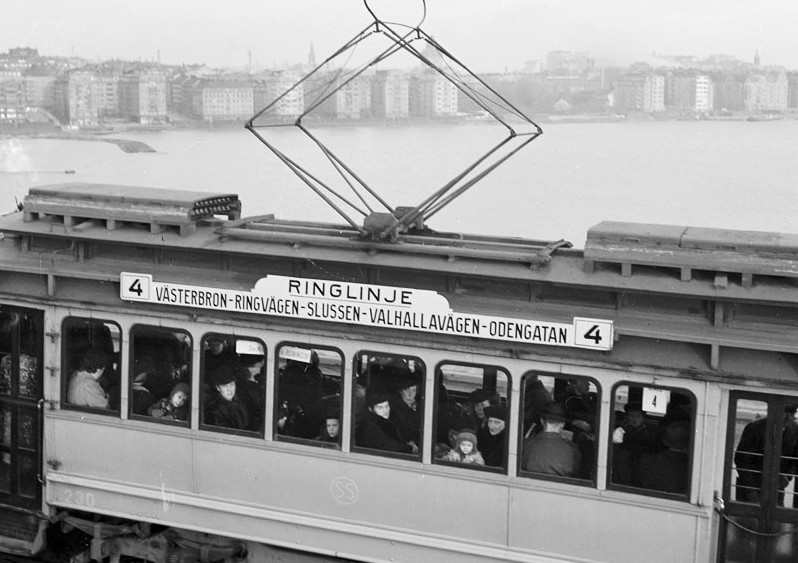
A tram on the bridge, 1940

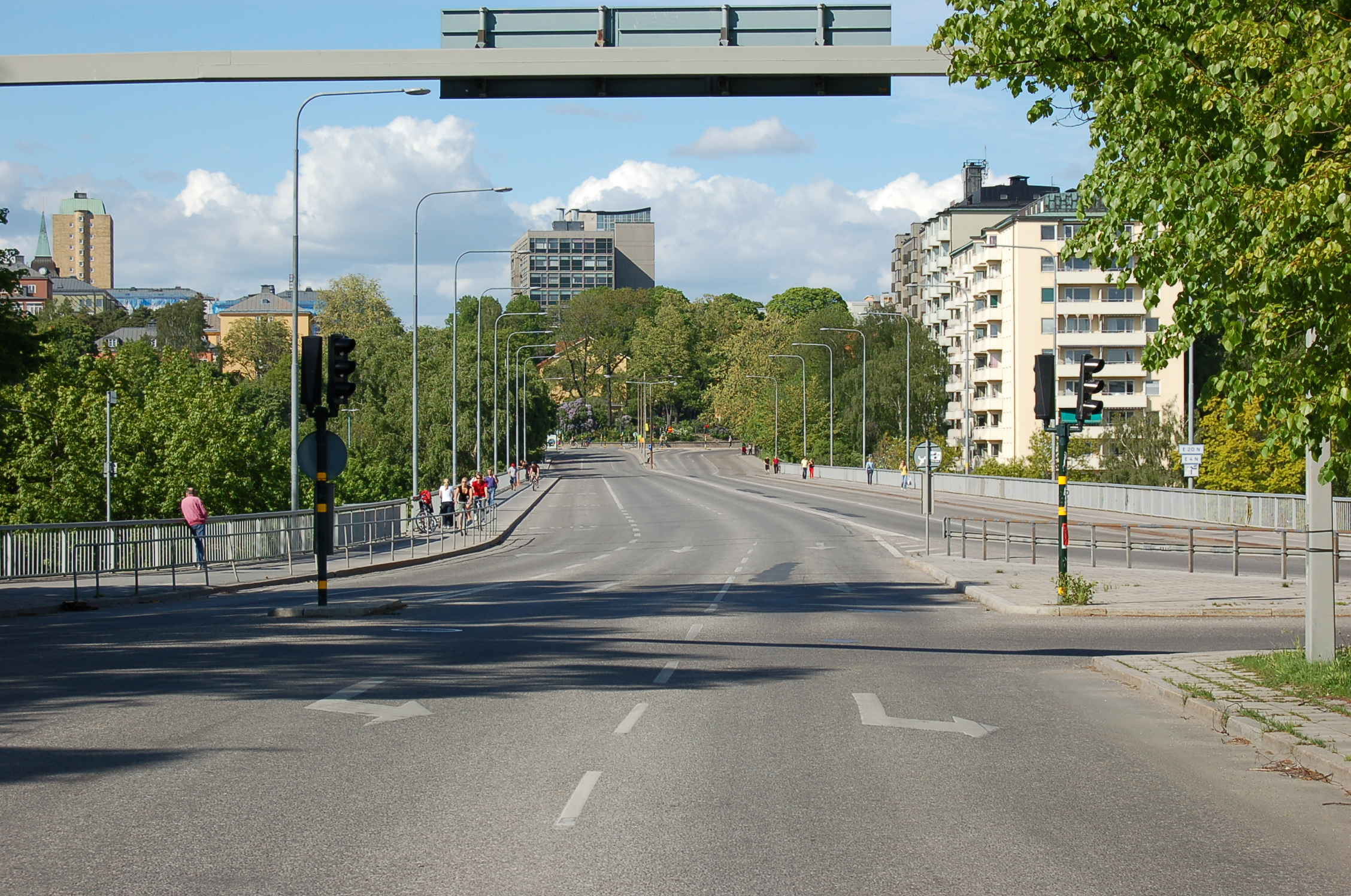
Northern section of the bridge passing over the park Rålambhovsparken.

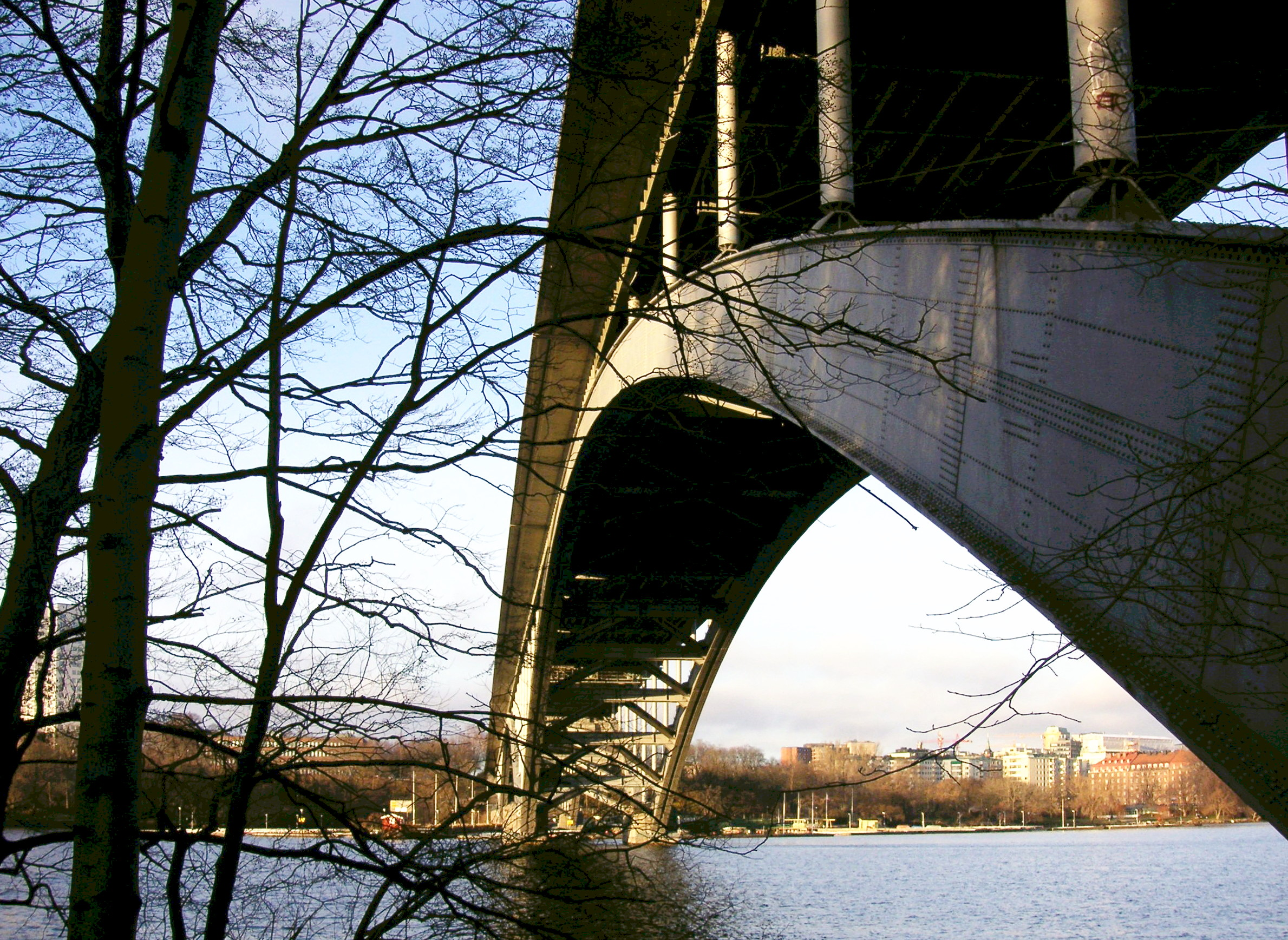
Västerbron's bridge span on Långholmen

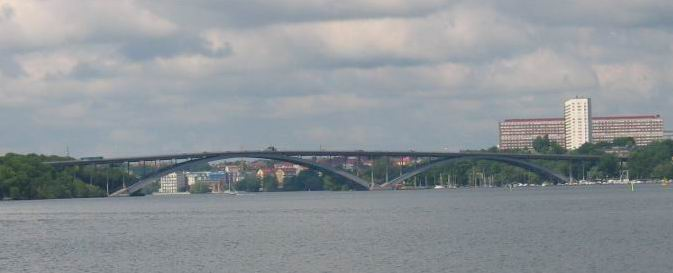
Västerbron viewed from the Old town with Långholmen to the left and Kungsholmen to the right.

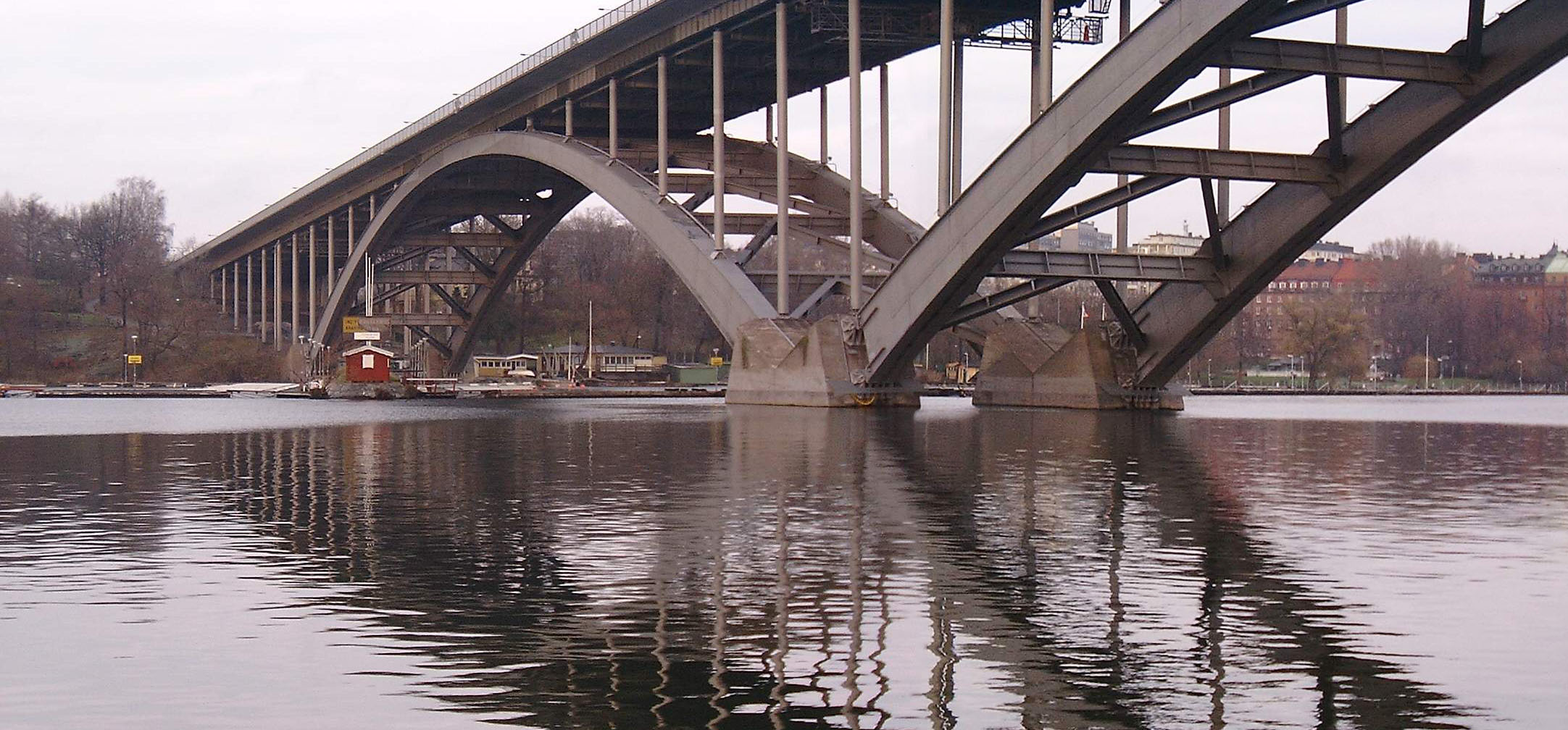
View from Långholmen facing north

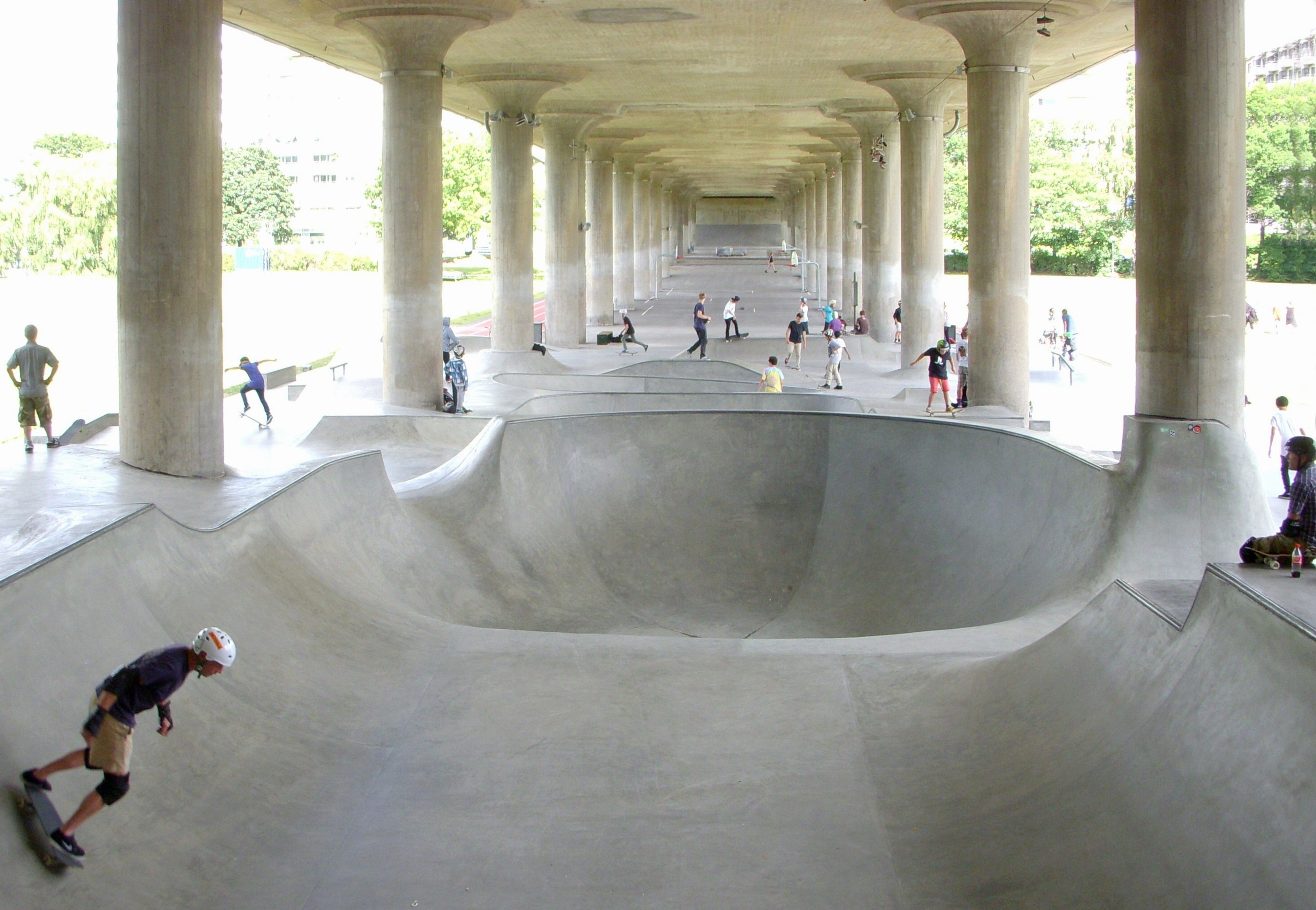
A skate park under the Little Västerbron

== See also ==
- List of bridges in Stockholm
- Långholmsbron
- Pålsundsbron
- Hornstull
- Reimersholme
