= Elli Hemberg =

Swedish artist (1896–1994)

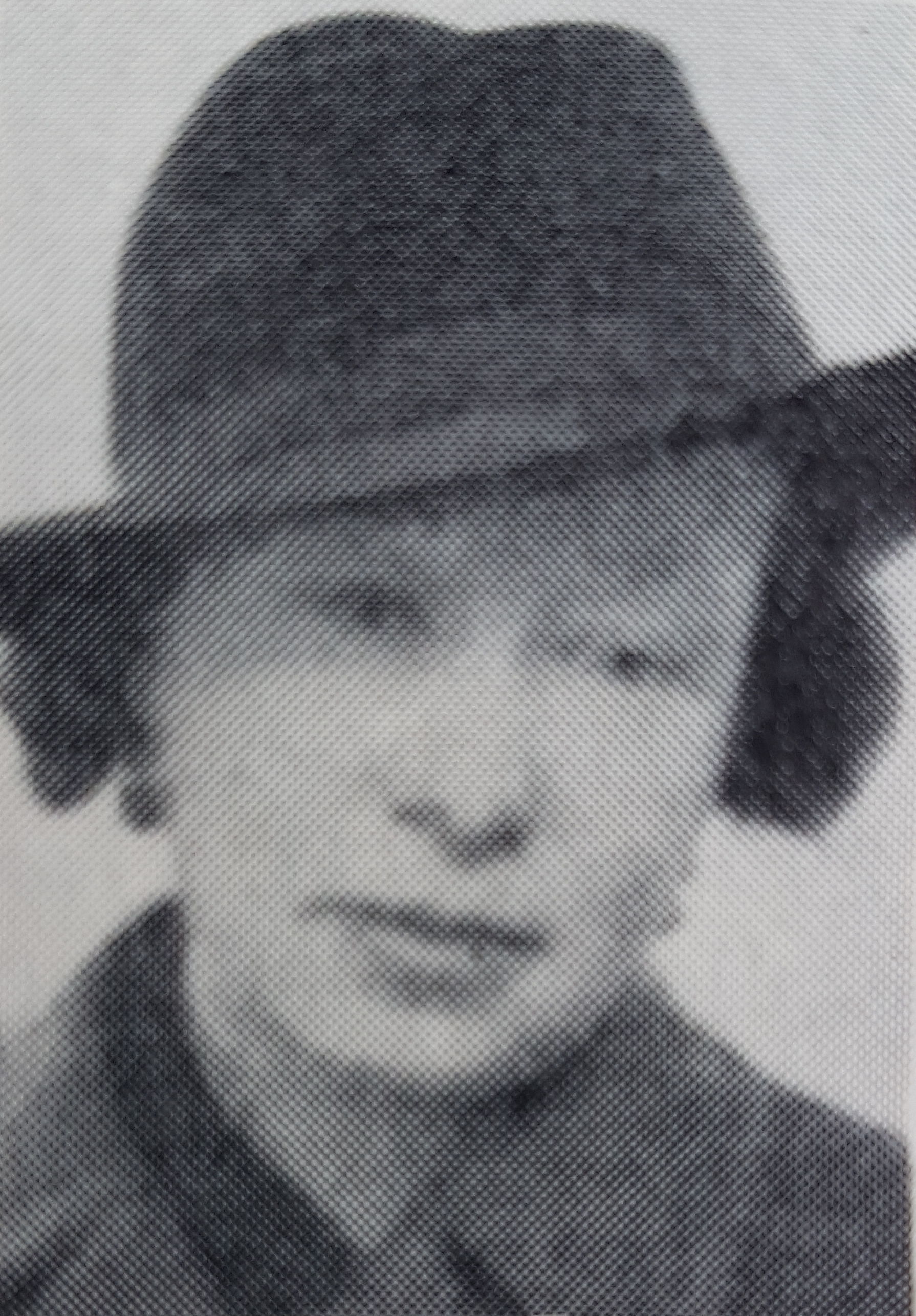
Elli Hemberg

Elin Elisabeth "Elli" Hemberg (13 November 1896 - 23 May 1994), was a Swedish abstract painter and sculptor. She is most famous for her architectural sculptures, which often feature three-dimensional visuals and elements of dynamic symmetry. Her work is featured in the Museum of Modern Art in Stockholm, as well as the Museum of Art in Kalmar, among other places.

== Biography ==
Elli Hemberg was the daughter of the provost Johan Hemberg and his wife Signe Hedenius, an artist whose father was the notable Swedish Professor of medicine Per Hedenius. She grew up in the Swedish town of Skövde, and later attended Wilhelmsons School of Art (1918-1922), run by the painter Carl Wilhelmson.

In September 1923, Hemberg married the Swedish physician Sven Erlandsson in Våmbs Church, outside Skövde. Over the following years, she undertook several study trips around Europe: Italy and Paris (1923), Vienna and Italy (1925), Paris (1929), Norway (1937), and Holland (1938).

== Career ==
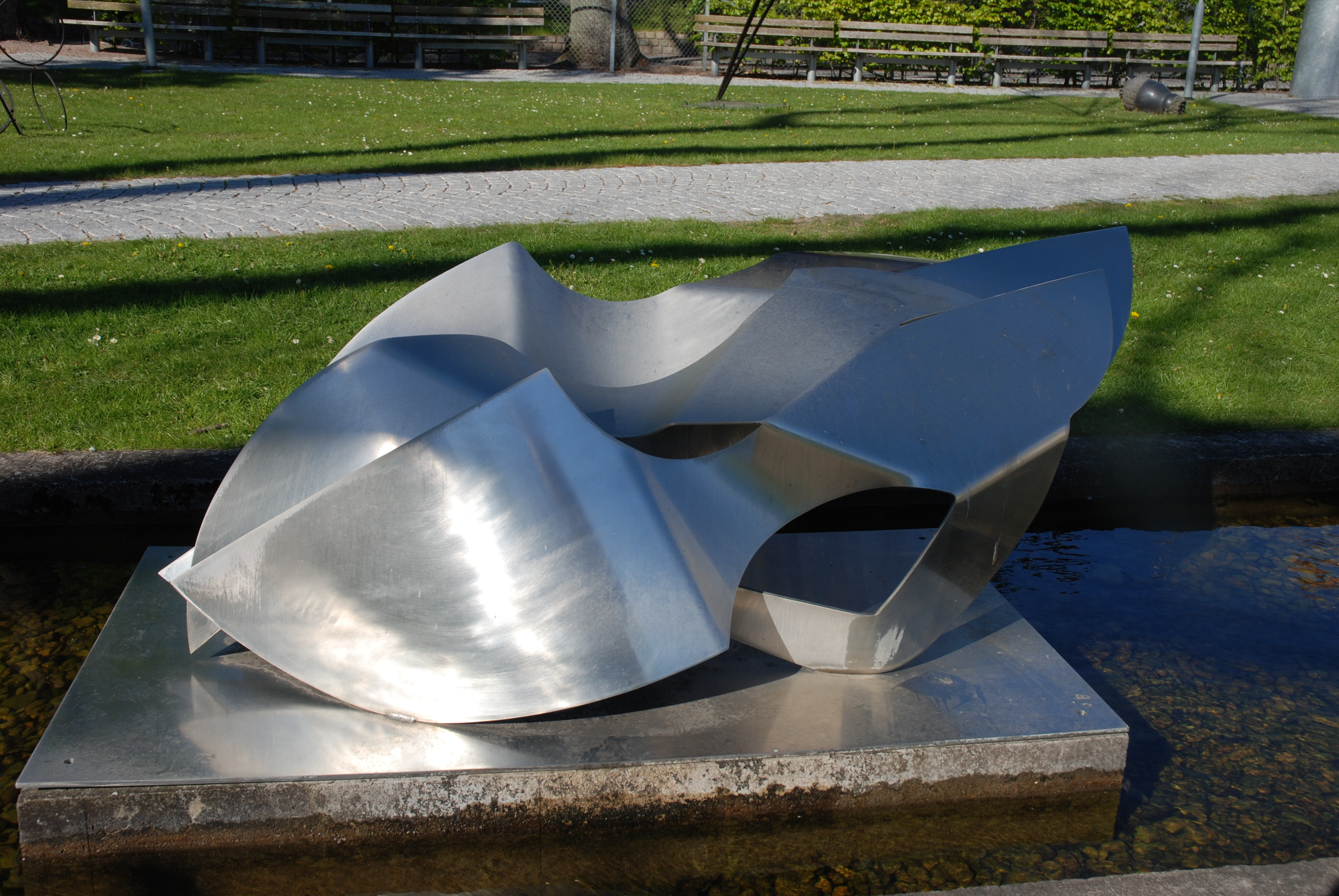
'Badande' (1978)

=== Early Paintings ===
Hemberg's early work consisted primarily of portraits and landscapes. Her first major exhibition was as part of the 'November Exhibition' in 1922 at Liljevalch's Art Gallery in Stockholm. She then had her first solo exhibition at 'Galerie Moderne' (1942) in Stockholm. In the 1940s, she initiated a close collaboration with the avant-garde artist Otto Carlsund, who experimented with cubism, purism, and neoplasticism. The two displayed their work in 1947 at Konstnärshuset in Stockholm. During this period, Hemberg began transitioning towards a more abstract style, focusing on form and rhythm, which eventually led her to transition from painting to sculpture.

=== Sculpture ===
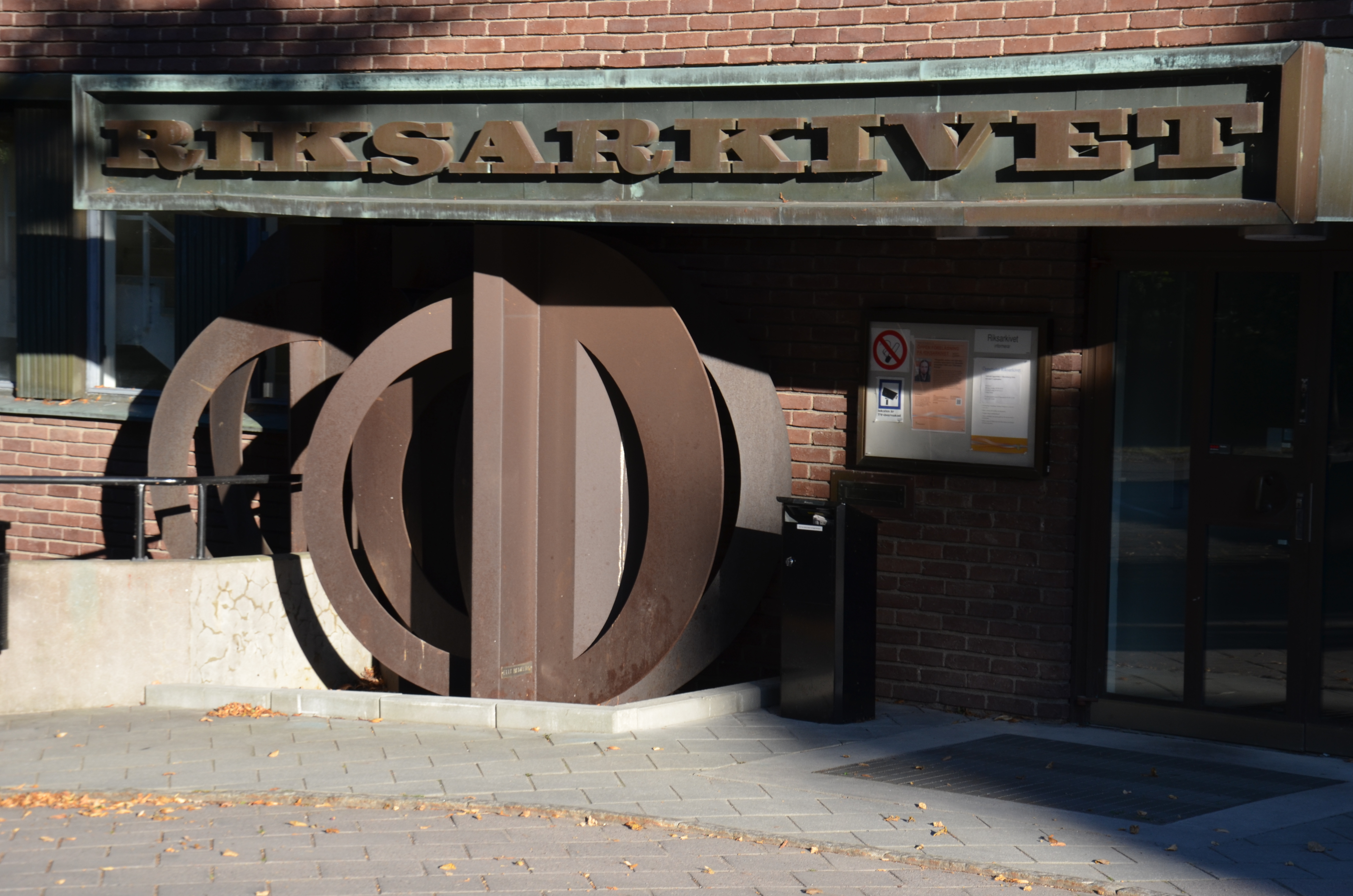
'The Orb' (1970)

In the mid 1960s, Hemberg, together with Olle Bærtling and Karl Göte Bejemark, among others, were part of the art salon 'Samlaren', and considered at the forefront of Swedish sculptors. In the 1970s Hemberg began to achieve fame and acceptance in the art community, primarily through her sculptures, and she created a number of notable commissions for permanent public display, including: 'The Orb' (1970) for the National Archives of Sweden, 'Badande' (1978), displayed at the Museum of Sketches for Public Art in Lund, 'The Butterfly' (1980), displayed in Rålambshovsparken in Stockholm, 'Solkrets' (1989), displayed at Viktoria place in Skellefteå, and 'Three Leaves', displayed at Norrköping's Museum of Art.

Hemberg's sculptures were often large architectural pieces in wood, glass, metal, or concrete. Her work was heavily influenced by Jay Hambidge and thus often featured elements of dynamic symmetry, as well as three-dimensional aspects.

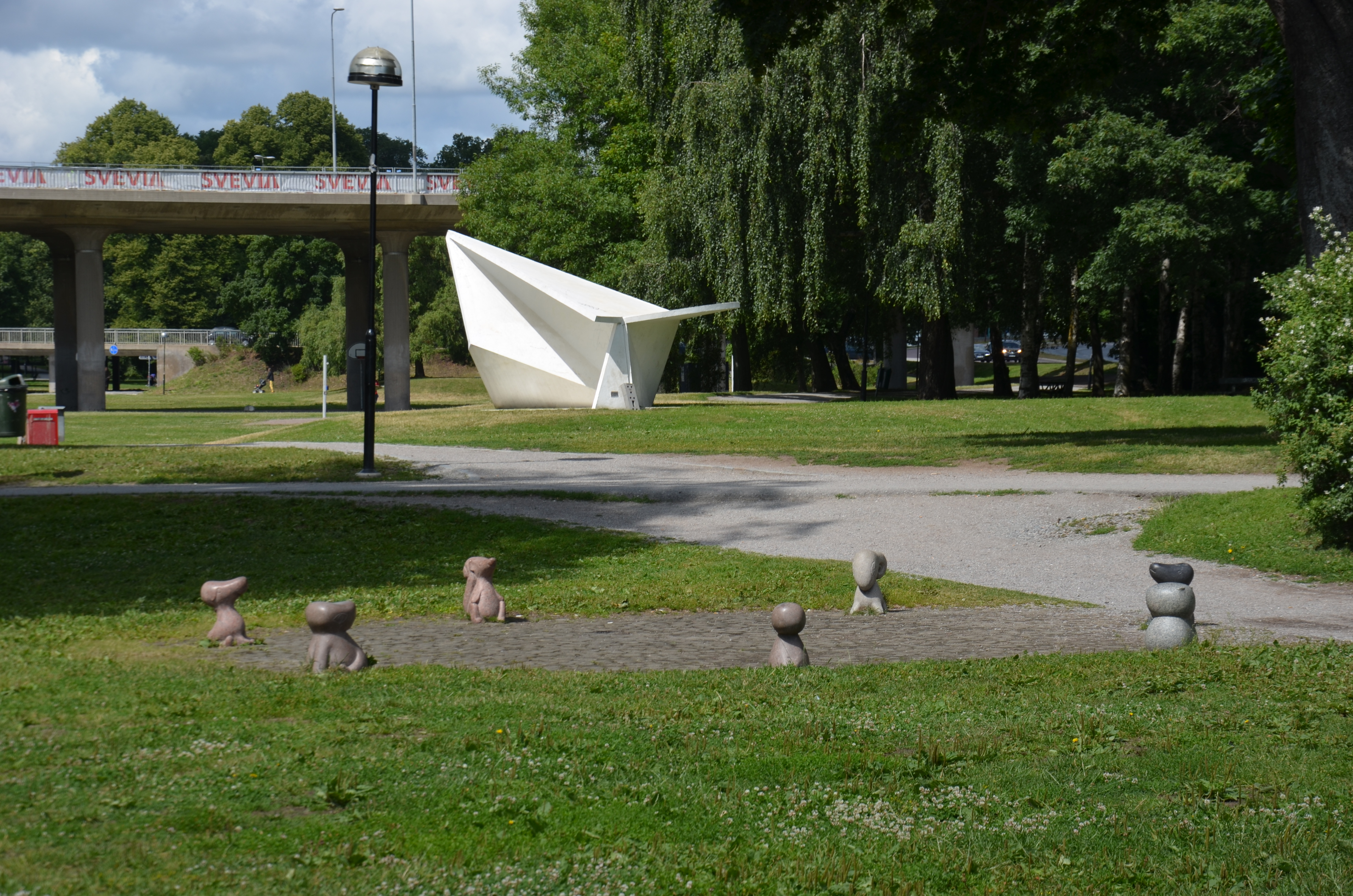
Egon Möller-Nielsen's 'Djurriksdag' in the foreground and Elli Hemberg's 'The Butterfly' in the background.

Today, many of her works are on display in the Museum of Modern Art in Stockholm, the Museum of Art in Kalmar, as well as Skövde Art Gallery, among other galleries, museums, and permanent public displays.

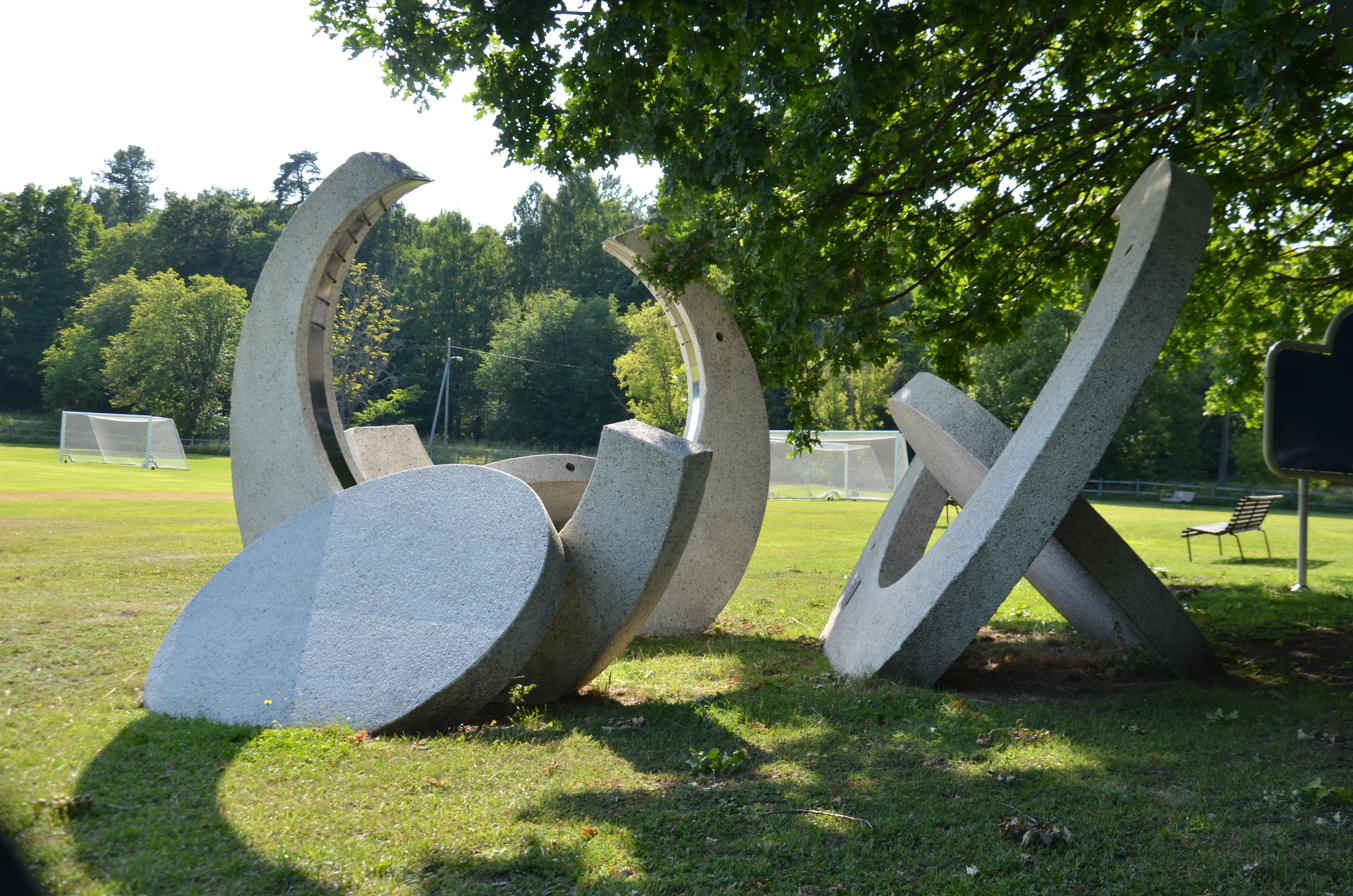
'Friendship between the people' (1986)
