= Långholmsbron =

Bridge in central Stockholm, Sweden

Coordinates: 59°19′9.5″N 18°1′41.5″E

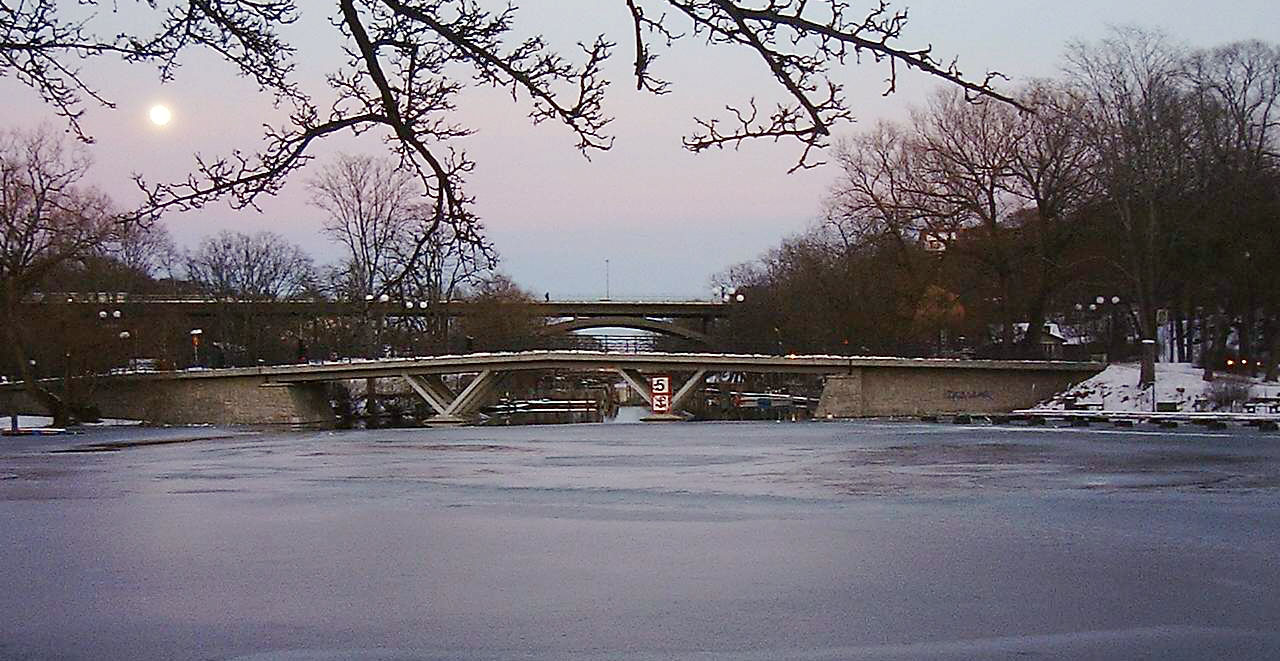
Långholmsbron with Västerbron in the background.

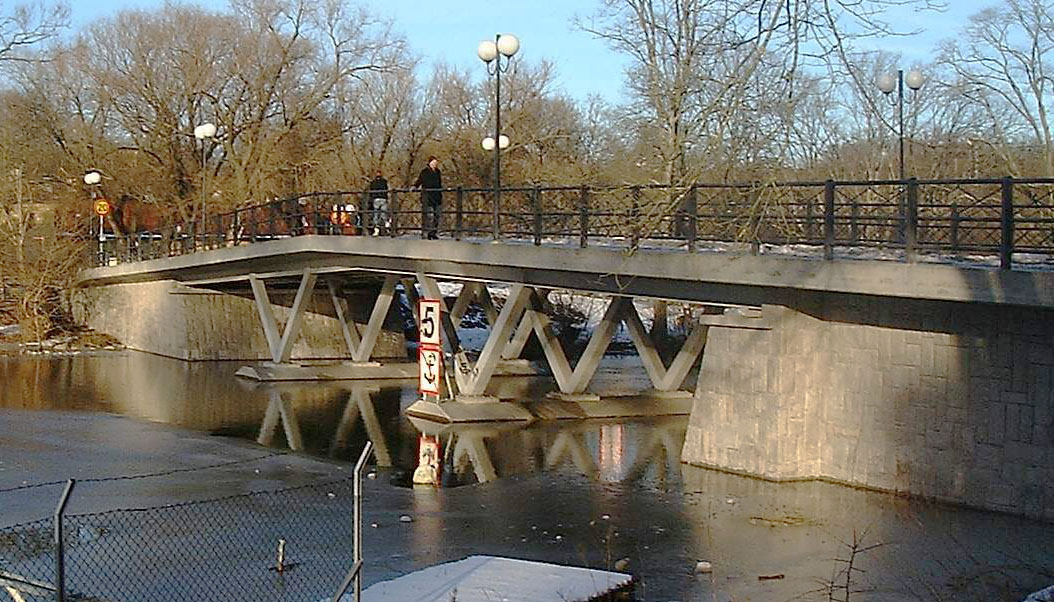
Close view.

Långholmsbron (Swedish: "The Long Islet Bridge") is a bridge in central Stockholm, Sweden. Connecting the major island Södermalm to the minor island Långholmen, it forms an extension to the street Bergsundsgatan.

The bridge was formerly called Spinnhusbron ("The spinning house Bridge") in reference to the precursor to the Långholmen prison, and, popularly, Suckarnas bro ("The Bridge of Sighs"), also in reference to the prison. Its present name stems from 1885. The section of Västerbron, the bridge overpassing Långholmsbron, used to be called Långholmsbron.

Most likely, an old wooden bridge was found here by the mid 17th century, as this was the location for a custom house dealing with the ships delivering goods to the city from Lake Mälaren. Nevertheless, it is present on a map dated 1733 and was replaced by a new wooden, four-span truss bridge in 1845, 33 metres long, and 6 metres wide. In 1931, the present three-span steel girder bridge was inaugurated; 56 metres in length and 8 metres wide with a roadway of 5.6 metres.

== See also ==
- List of bridges in Stockholm
- Reimersholmsbron
- Pålsundsbron
- Västerbron
