= Pålsundsbron =

Bridge between Södermalm and Långholmen in Stockholm, Sweden

Coordinates: 59°19′12.81″N 18°2′3.03″E

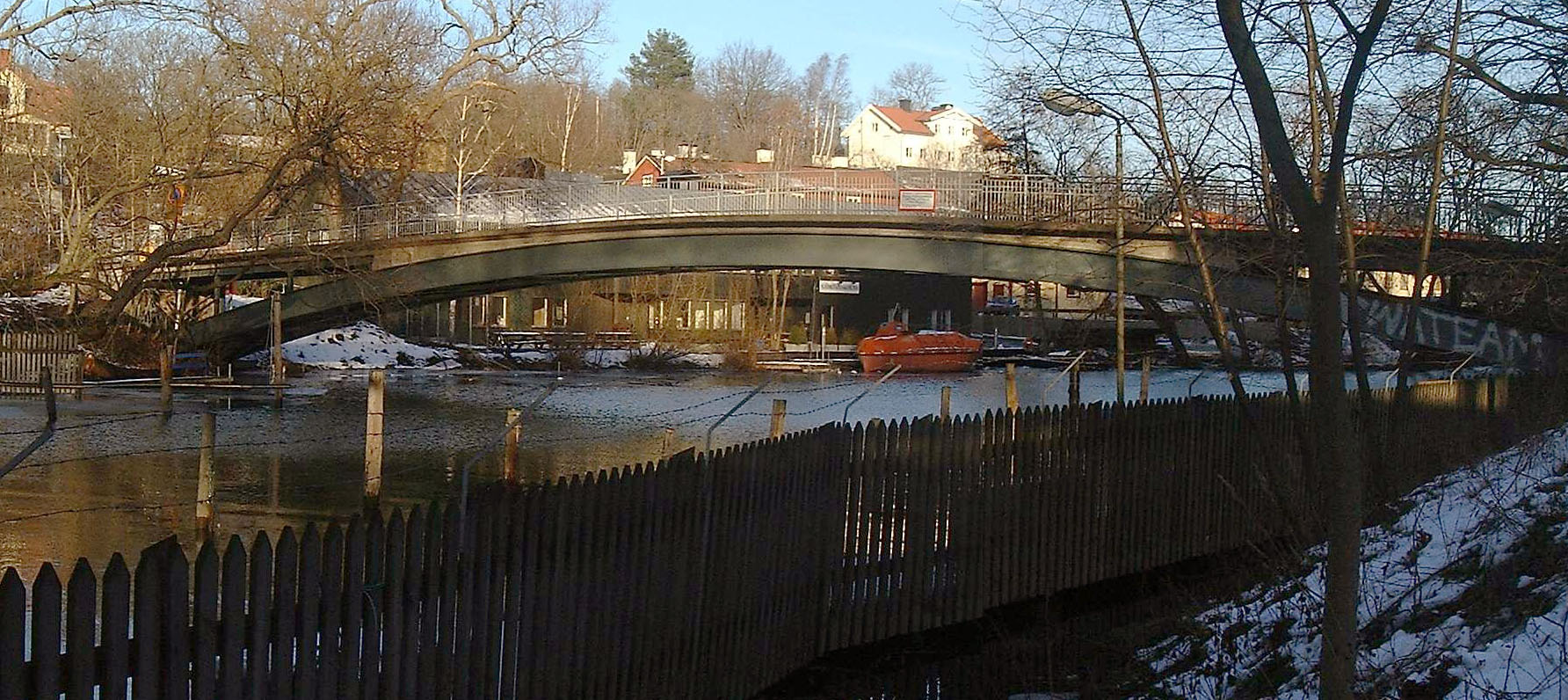
Pålsundsbron in February 2007.

Pålsundsbron (Swedish: "The Pole Sound/Strait Bridge") is a bridge in central Stockholm, Sweden. Stretching over the small water course Pålsundet, the bridge connects the major island Södermalm to the minor island Långholmen.

The name Pålsundet, on old maps called Påhl Sundet, or Pålsund, refers to the poles blocking the canal from ships trying to reach central Stockholm without paying the required duty. Also, an iron chain served the same purpose of forcing the ships pay a visit to the custom house (Winter Tullen) demolished during the 1930s. The bridge was known as Mälarvarvsbron ("The Mälaren Shipyard Bridge") or more locally Varvsbron until 1948 when it received its present name.

The original bridge on this location, after Långholmsbron the second bridge stretching over Pålsundet, was built in 1907 as a wooden truss bridge. It was 3.8 metres in width, with a total length of 56 metres stretching over eight 7 metres long spans, of which the central span was a hand-driven flip bascule extending the horizontal clearance of 3.7 metres.

In 1947, the wooden bridge was replaced by a steel arch bridge stretching 52.5 metres in a single span over the sound, with a width of 4.5 metres. Its steel arches were used five years earlier for the casting of the concrete arch of Kungsbron.

== See also ==
- List of bridges in Stockholm
- Reimersholmsbron
- Långholmsbron
- Västerbron
