= Riddarfjärden =

Bay of Lake Mälaren in Stockholm

Coordinates: 59°19′26″N 18°02′55″E

Riddarfjärden (Swedish: [ˈrɪ̂dːarˌfjæːɖɛn], "The Knight Firth") is the easternmost bay of Lake Mälaren in central Stockholm. Stockholm was founded in 1252 on an island in the stream where Lake Mälaren (from the west) drains into the Baltic Sea (to the east); today the island is called Stadsholmen and constitutes Stockholm's Old Town.

Sweden's national bard, Carl Michael Bellman, was born in the Södermalm district of Stockholm, near the Riddarfjärden. Several of his Fredman's Epistles are set on Lake Mälaren, such as No. 48, the pastoral Solen glimmar blank och trind (The sun gleams smooth and round).

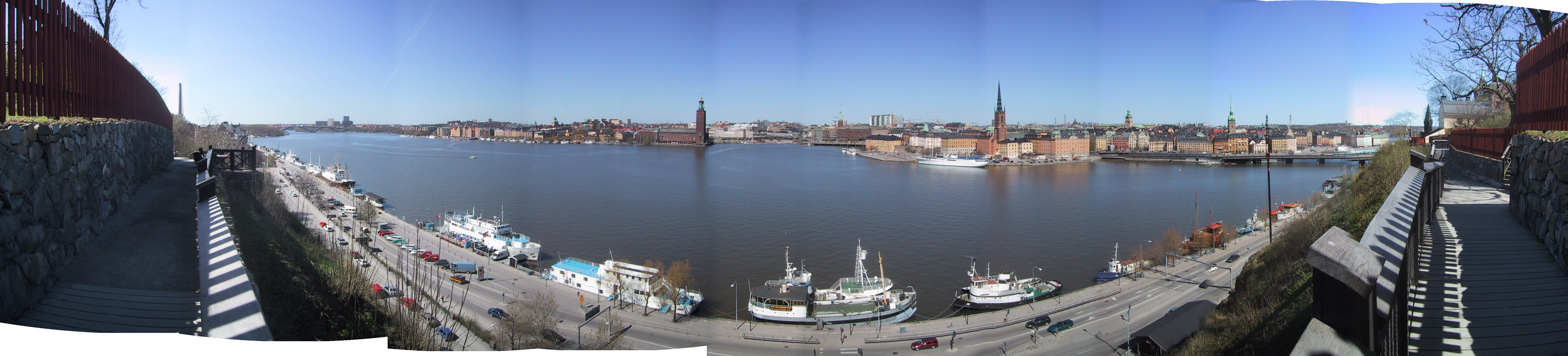
View from the heights of Södermalm, west of Stadsholmen, looking down on Riddarfjärden. Left to right are 1) Västerbron bridge 2) Kungsholmen Island 3) Stockholm City Hall, a red brick building with a bell tower, where the Nobel Prize dinner is served 4) The tower of Klara Kyrka on Norrmalm, with its green copper roof 5) five white skyscrapers between Sergels torg and Hötorget 6) construction cranes 7) iron tower of Riddarholmen Church on Riddarholmen Island 8) yellow tower of Storkyrkan on Stadsholmen, in front of the flat roof of the Stockholm Palace 9) narrow tower of Tyska Kyrkan on Stadsholmen 10) distant radio and TV tower Kaknästornet
Riddarfjärden throughout the year

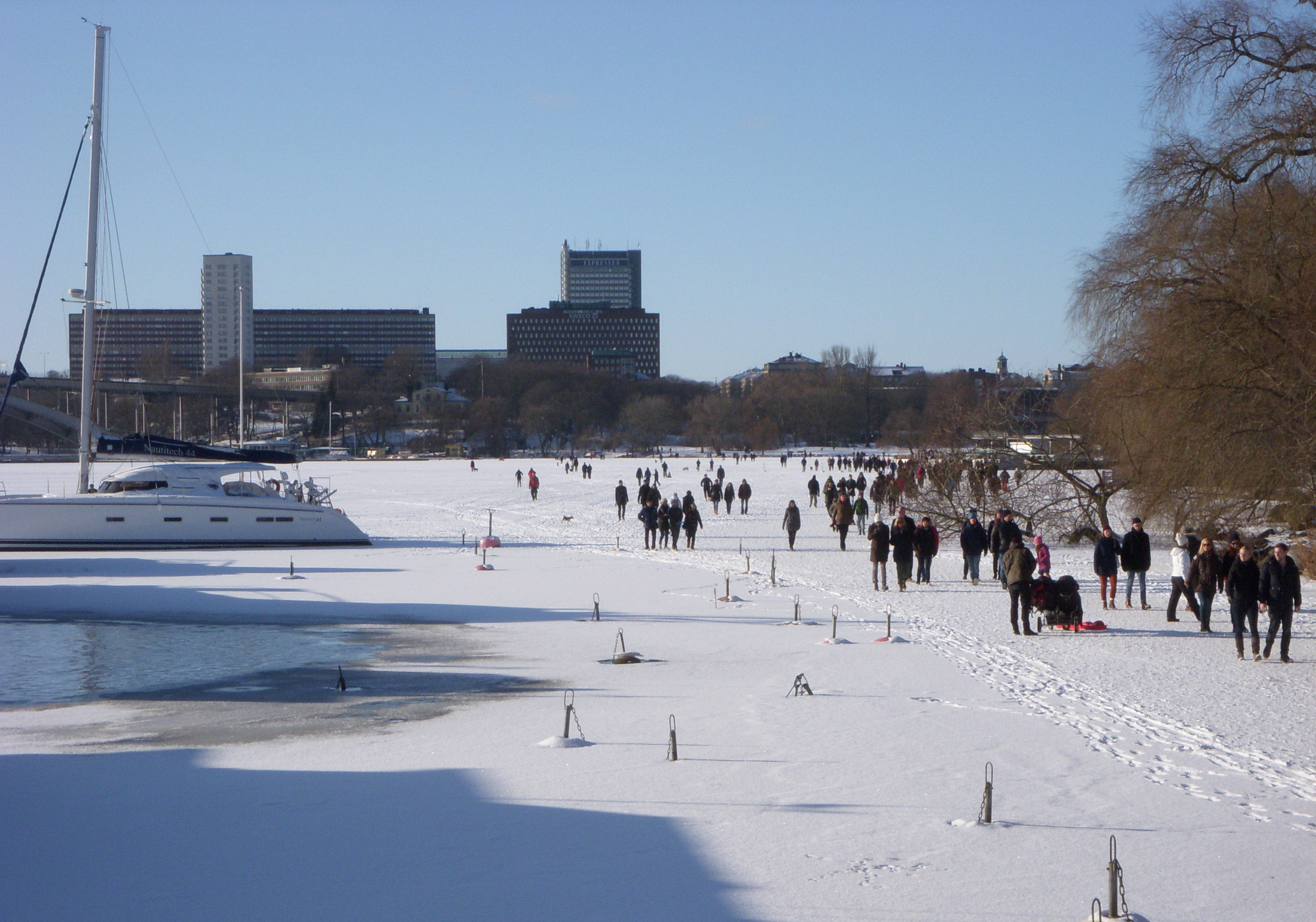
Riddarfjärden in winter at Norr Mälarstrand

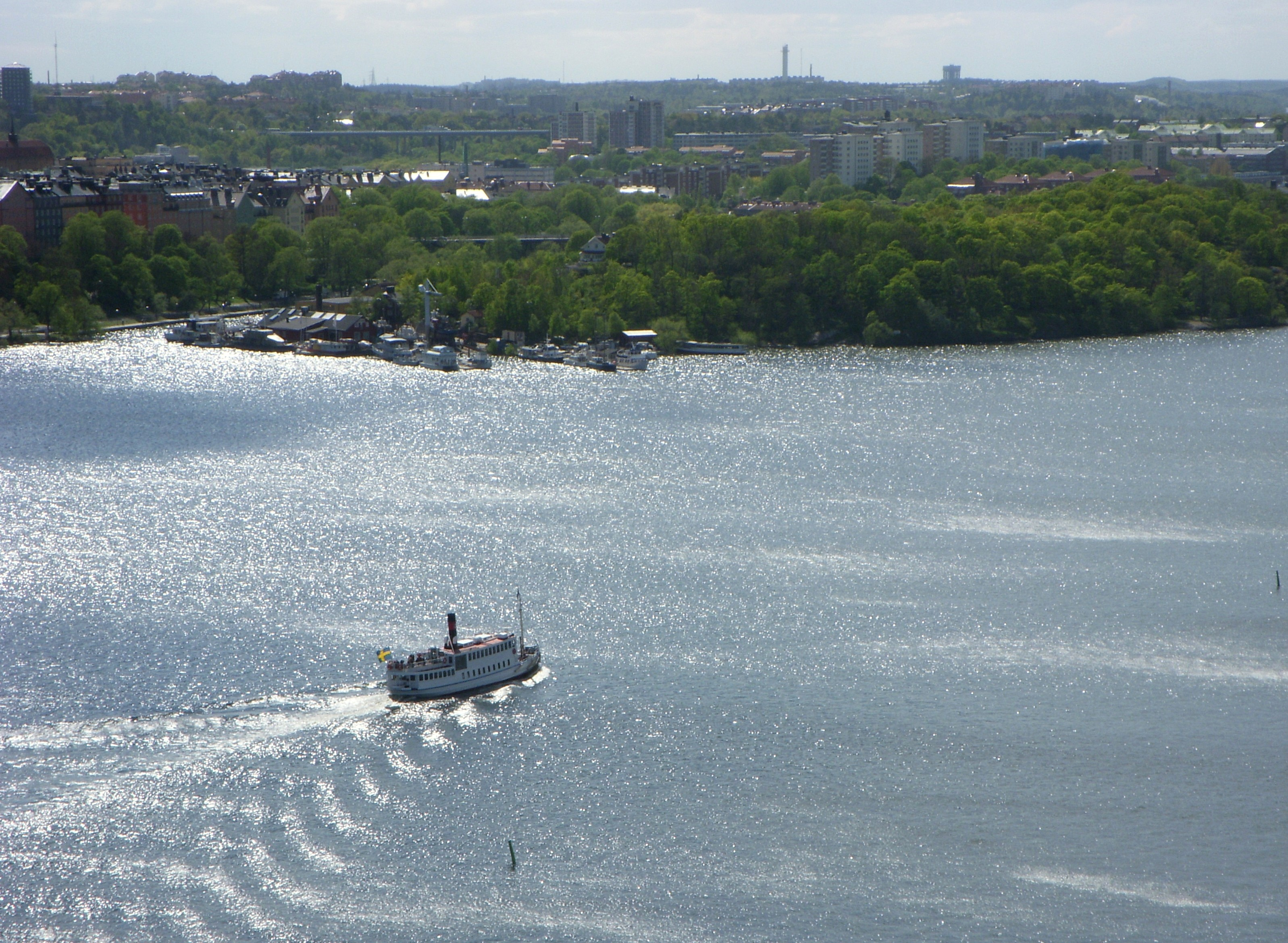
In the spring looking towards Långholmen

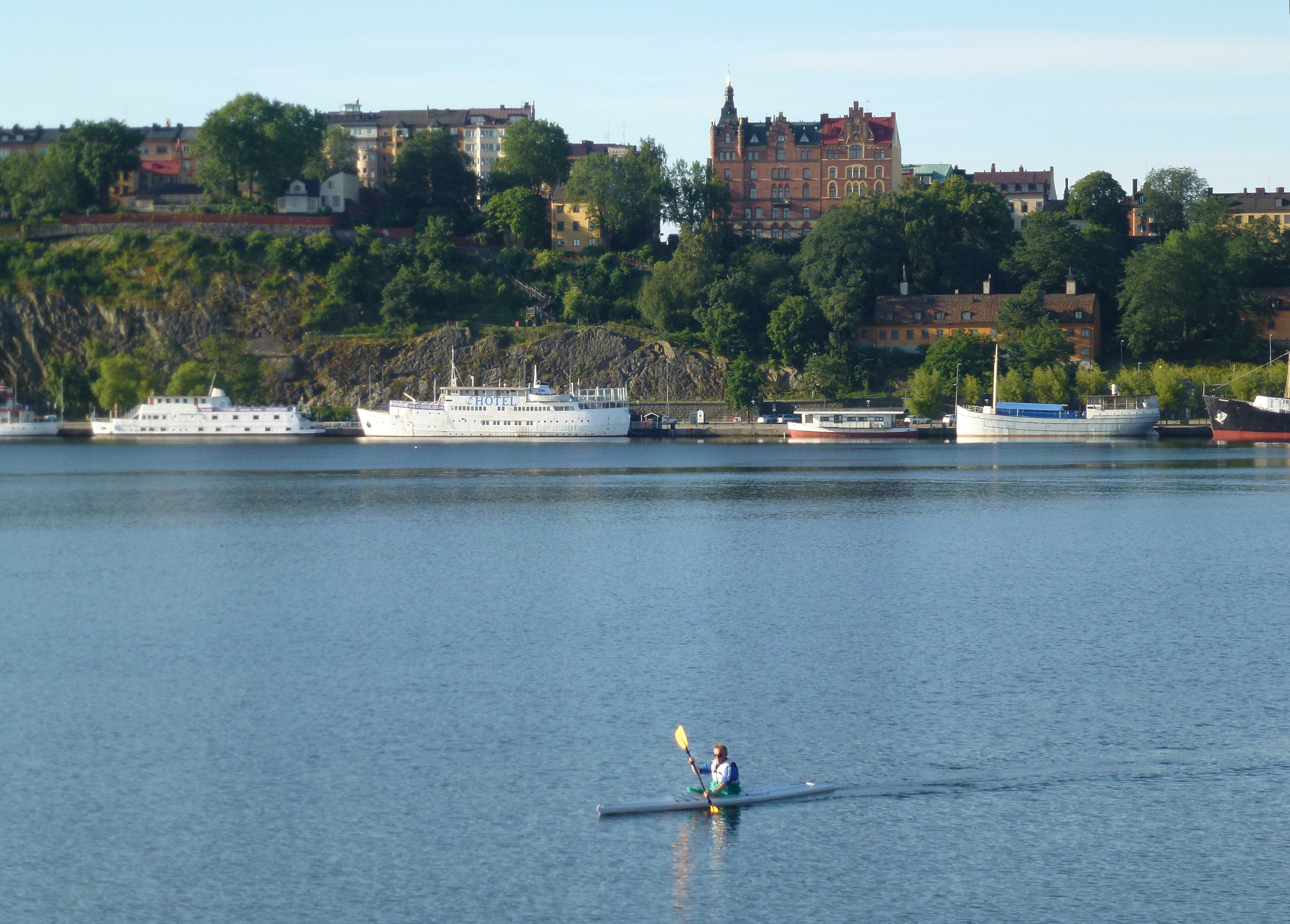
Early summer morning looking towards Södermalm

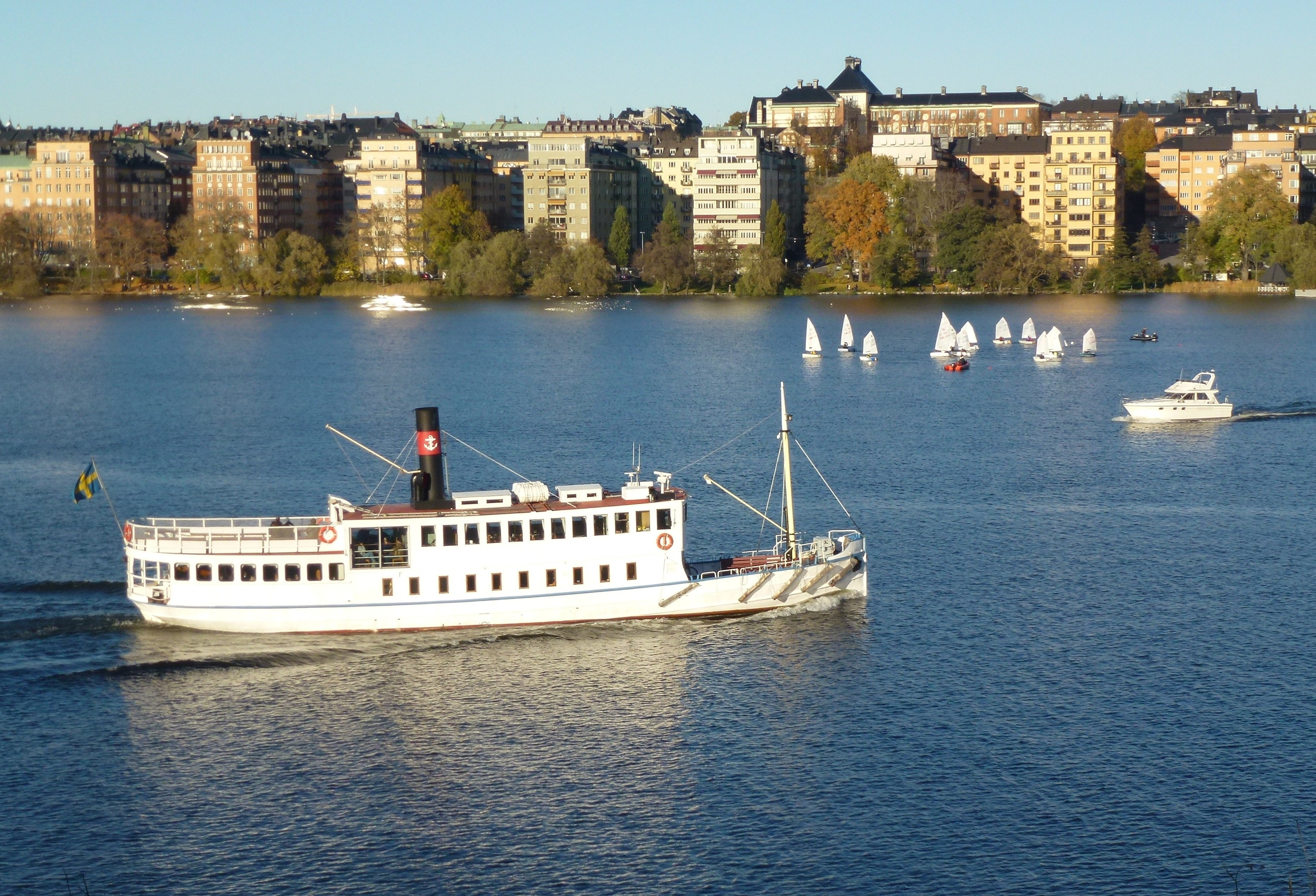
In the autumn, seen from Långholmen.

== See also ==
- Geography of Stockholm
