= Rålambshovsparken =

Park on Kungsholmen in Stockholm, Sweden

Coordinates: 59°19′44″N 18°01′25″E

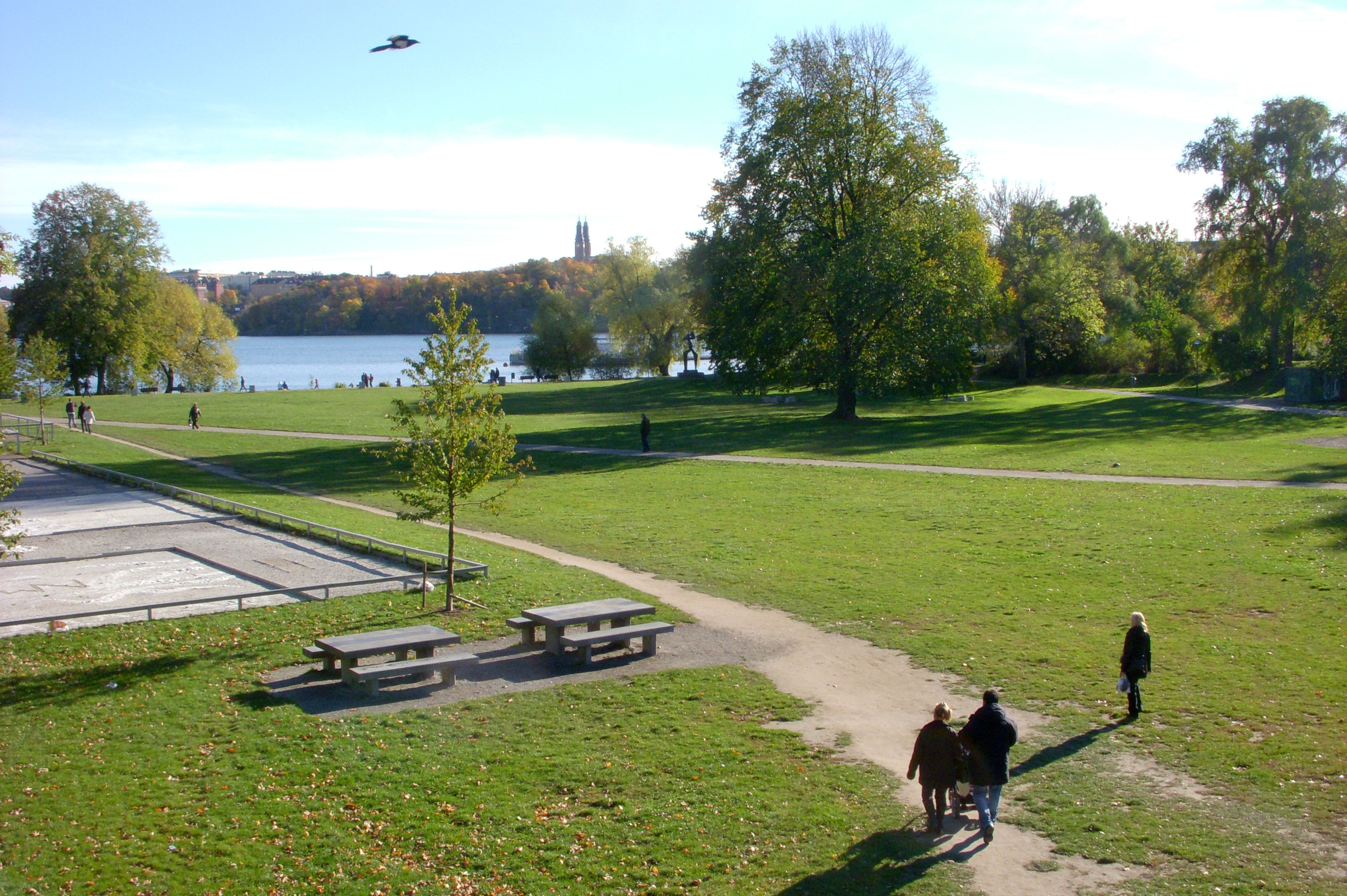
- Rålambshovsparken in October 2010
- Interactive map of Rålambshovsparken
- Type: Urban park
- Location: Kungsholmen, Stockholm, Sweden
- Status: Open all year

Rålambshovsparken (English: Rålambshov Park) is a park in the Marieberg district on the island of Kungsholmen in Stockholm, Sweden.

== Location ==
This park passes under a section of Västerbron. In the west, the park borders the Konradsberg campus of Stockholm University, in the east it extends toward promenade of Norr Mälarstrand and to the south-east it opens onto Riddarfjärden.

== Sculptures ==
Rålambshovsparken is home to several sculptures: Monument över Yxman by Eric Grate (1896-1983), Domarring by Egon Möller-Nielsen (1915- 1959), Fjärilen by Elli Hemberg and Färgtorn by Lars Erik Falk (1922-2018).

== History ==
The park opened in 1936 and was one of the first in Stockholm to be designed according to functionalist principles. It was designed by landscape architect Erik Glemme (1905-1959) and resembles the functionalist style popular in that era. In celebration of Stockholm's 700-year anniversary, an amphitheater was added in 1953, with capacity for 5,000 people.

In 1982, Rålambshovsparken was the site of the Hotline Riot, after about 1,000 teenagers arranged to meet through heta linjen, a informal telephone group chat enabled by a quirk in the design of Televerket's exchanges.

Rålis Skatepark was inaugurated in 2010 under "Lilla Västerbron".

On 8 September 2018 Greta Thunberg announced in the park's theater at the beginning of the People's Climate March that, though her original three-week schoolstrike before the Swedish elections that were due the next day was ending, she and other students had decided to henceforth keep striking school and demanding climate justice every Friday. The park is therefore the site of the founding of the movement Fridays for Future.

== Gallery ==
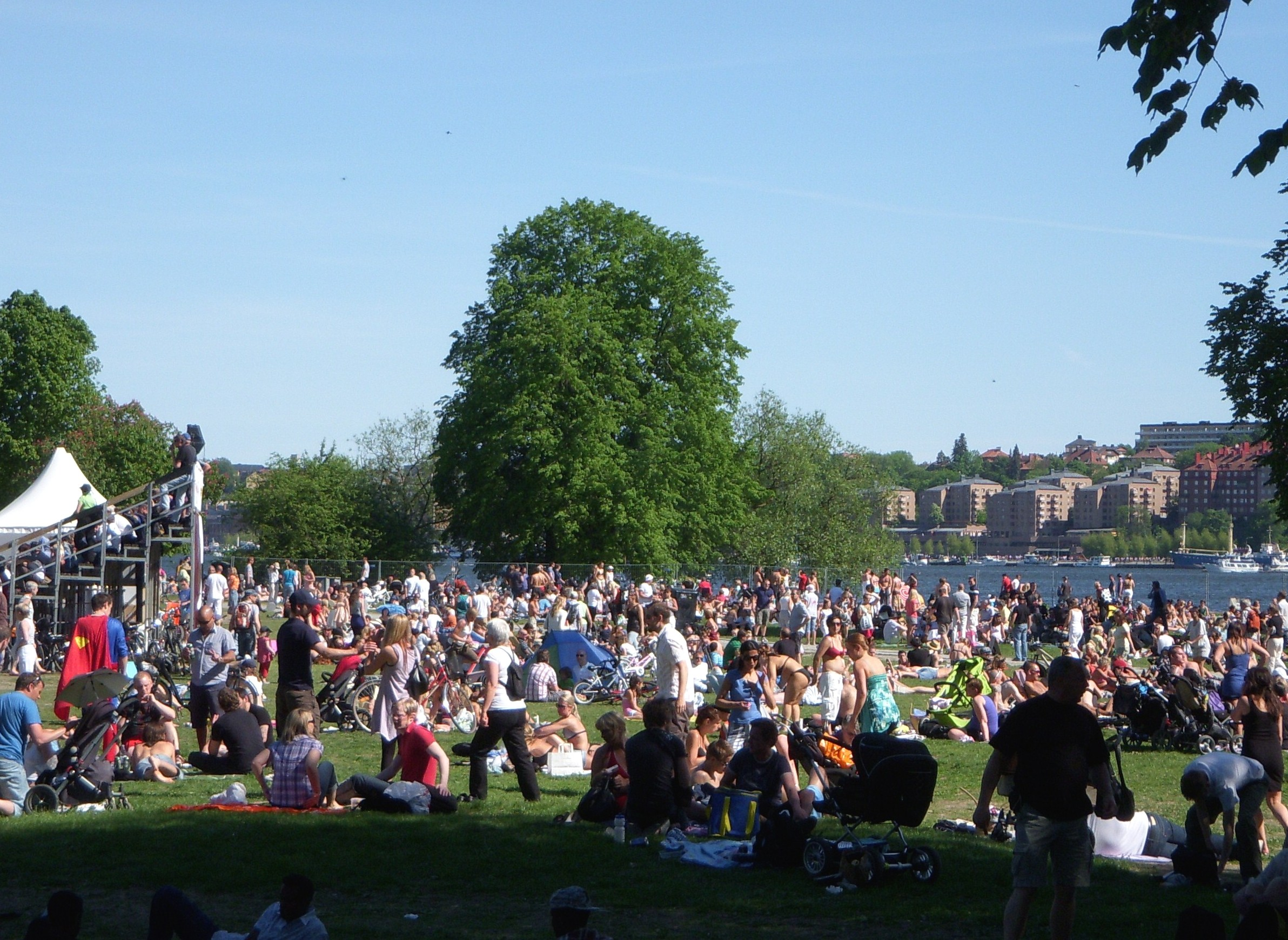
Park in summer

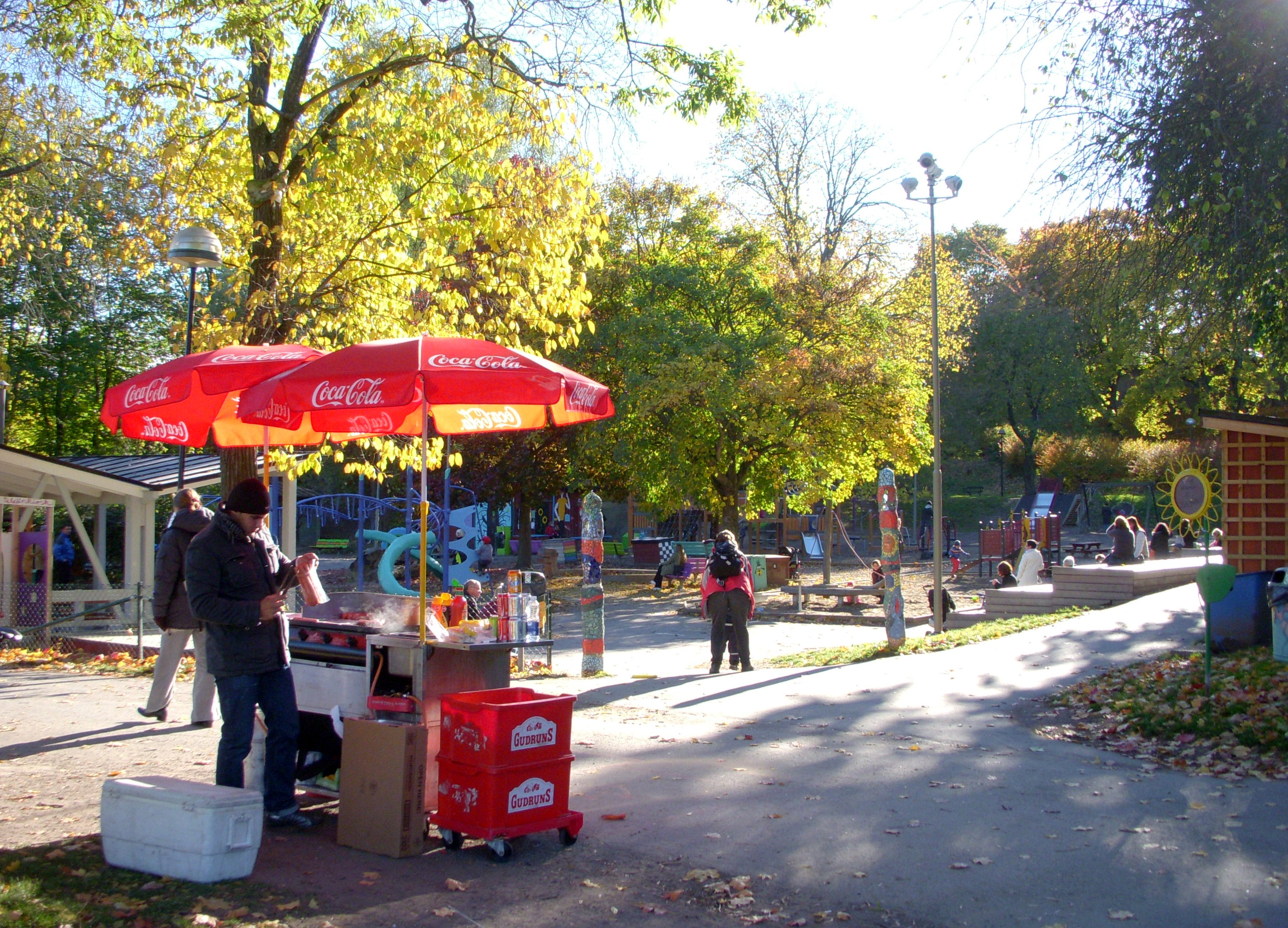
Playground in fall

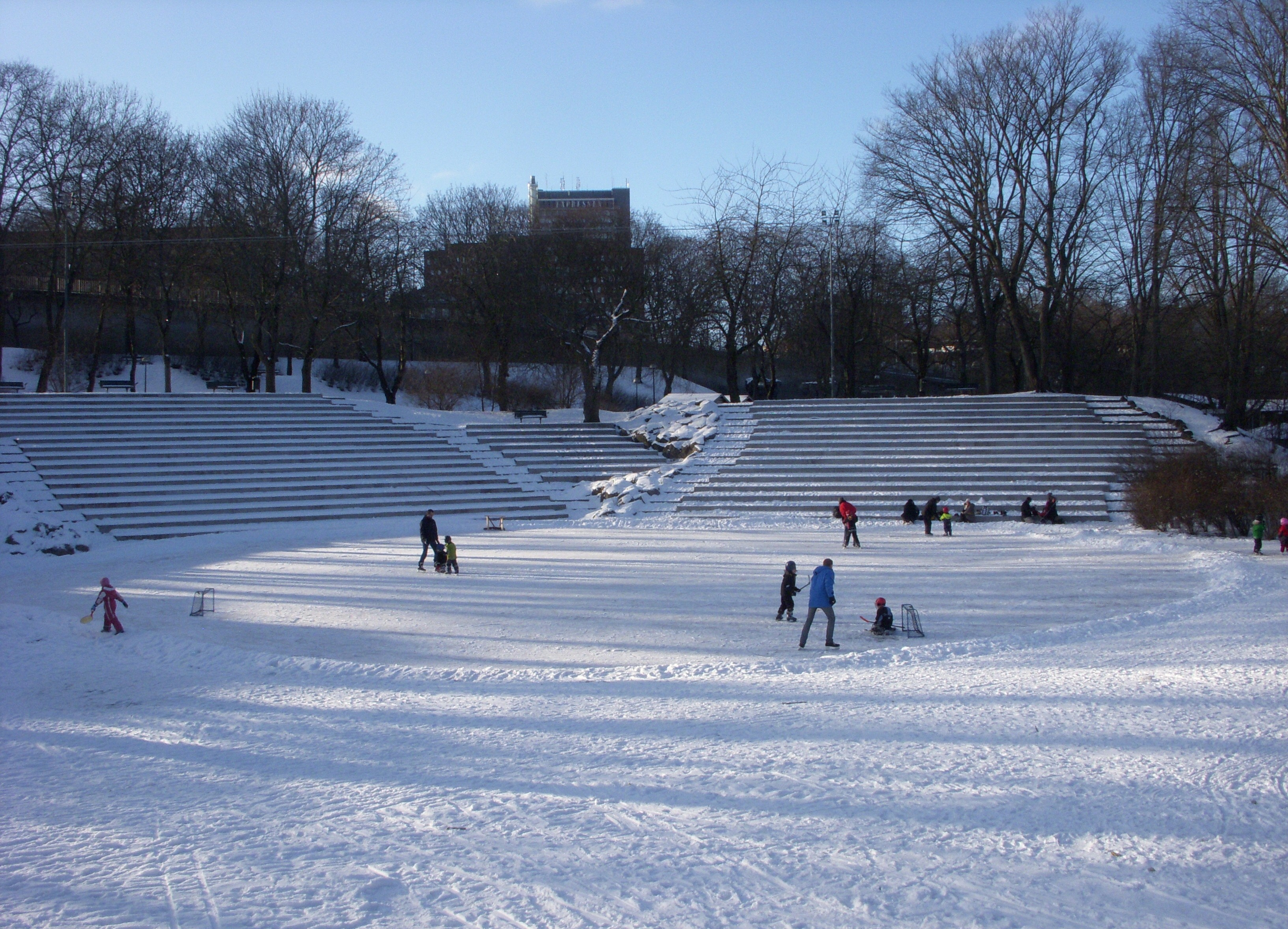
Amphitheater in winter

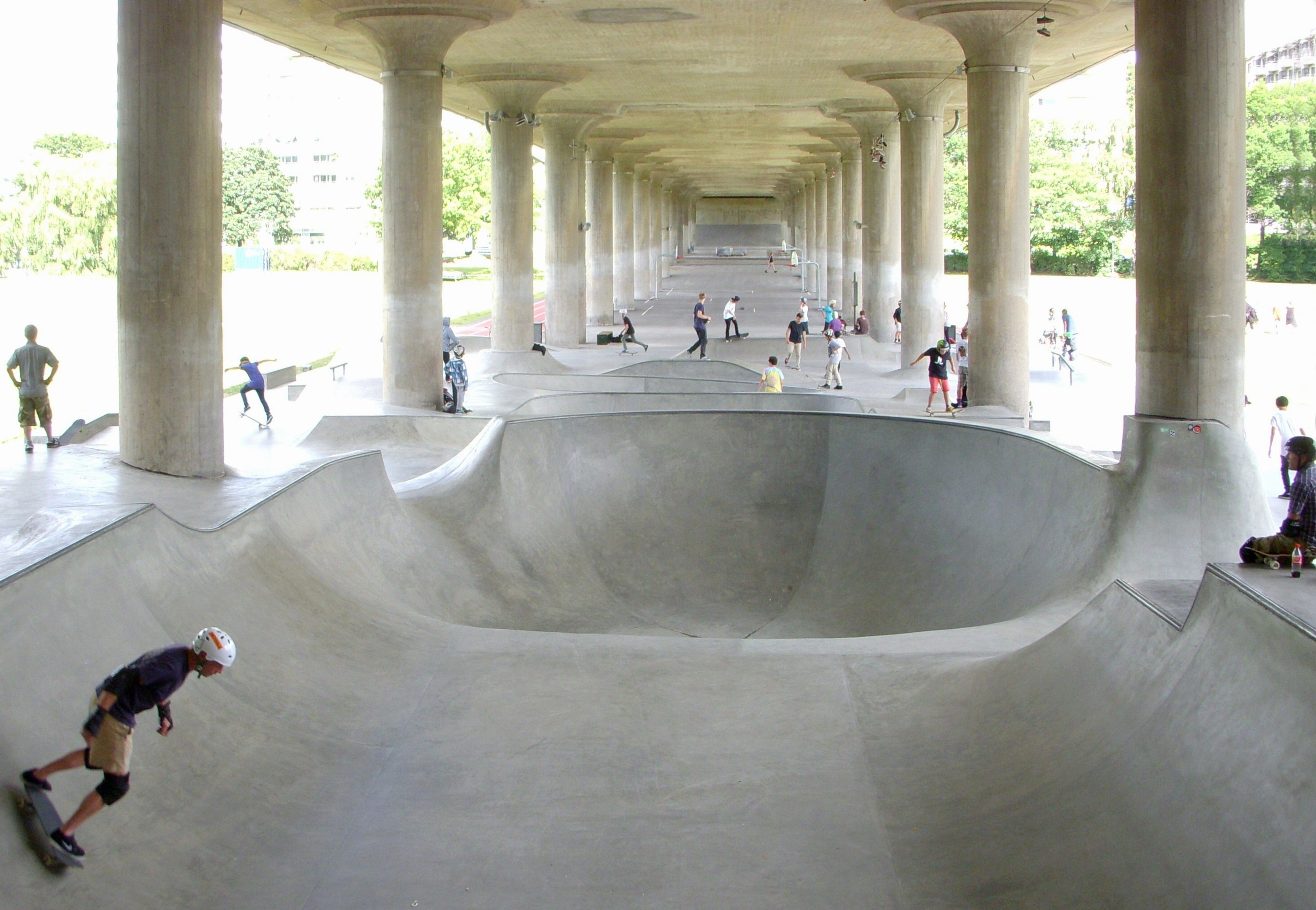
Rålis Skatepark under "Lilla Västerbron"

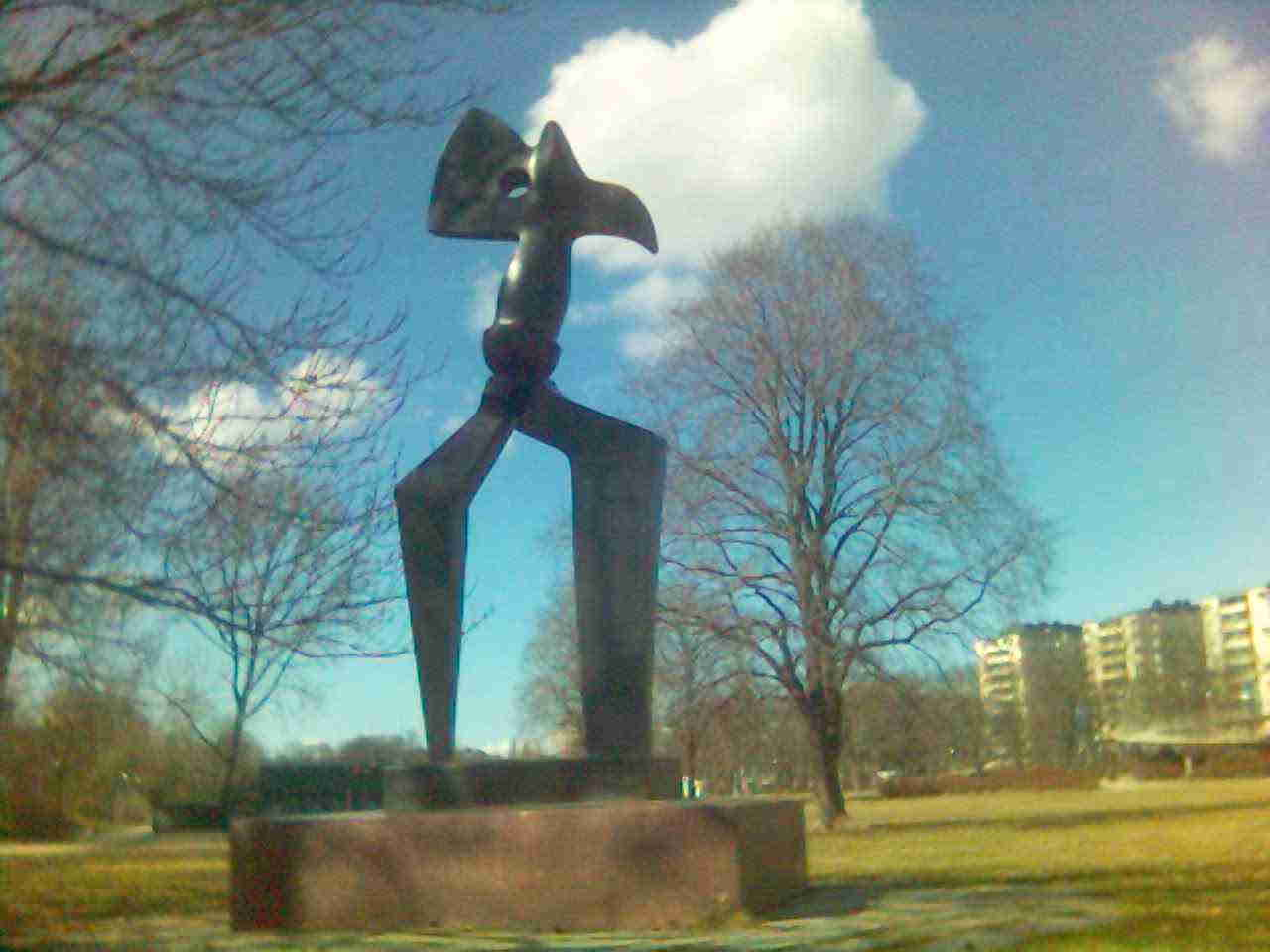
Monument över Yxman by Eric Grate (1967)

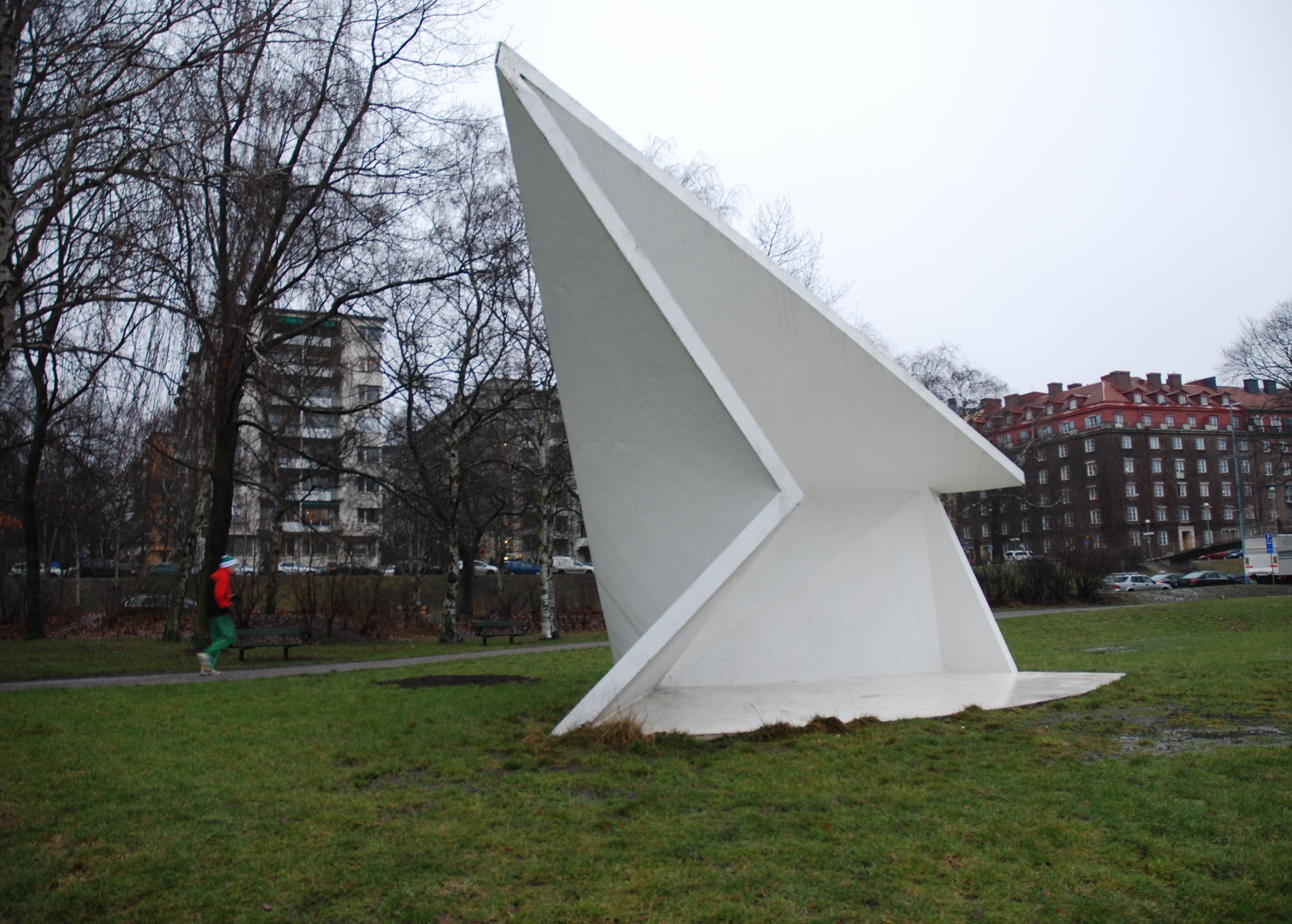
Fjärilen by Elli Hemberg (1980)

== See also ==
- Geography of Stockholm
