= Reimersholme =

Island in central Stockholm, Sweden

Coordinates: 59°19′6″N 18°01′15″E

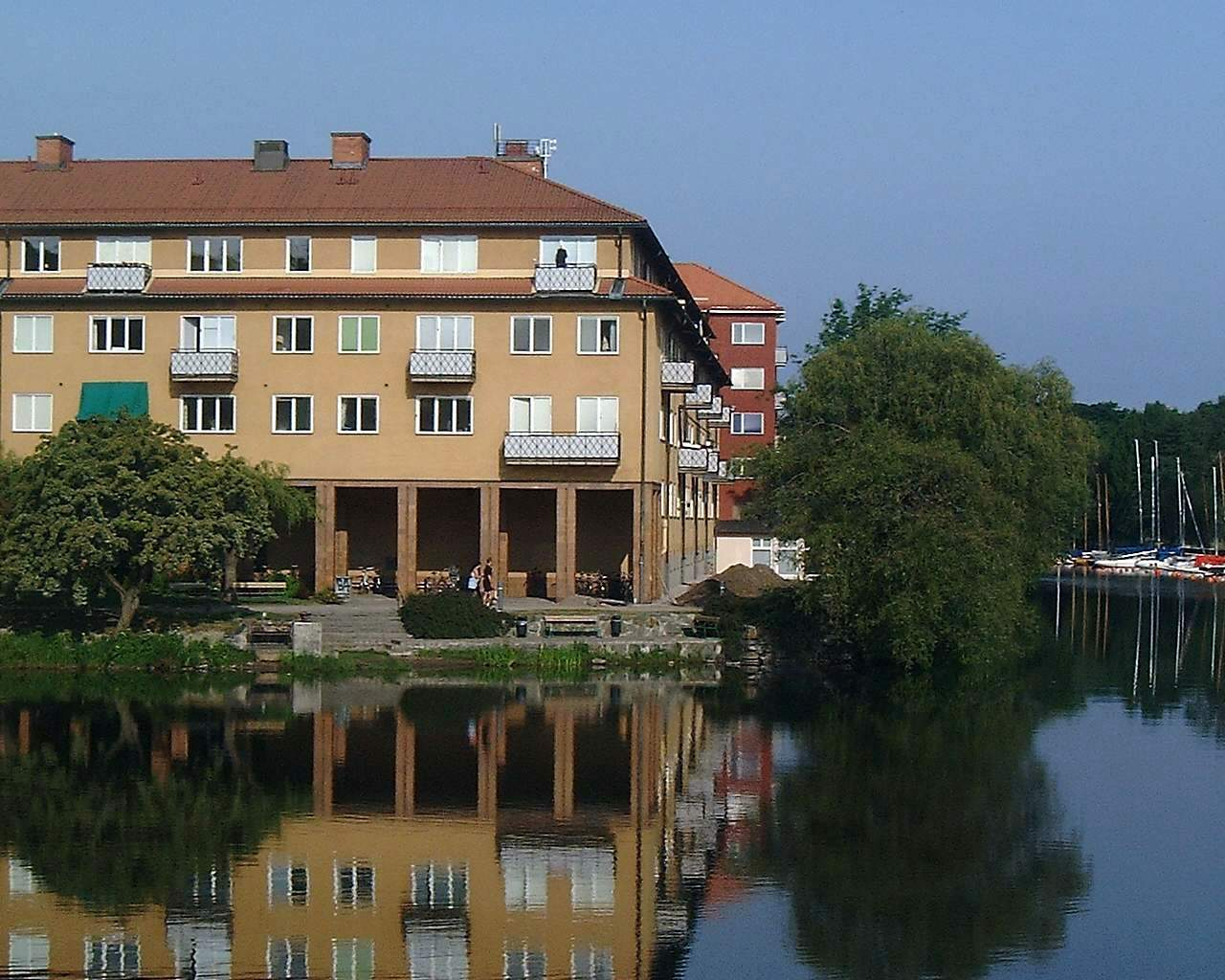
North-eastern corner of Reimersholme

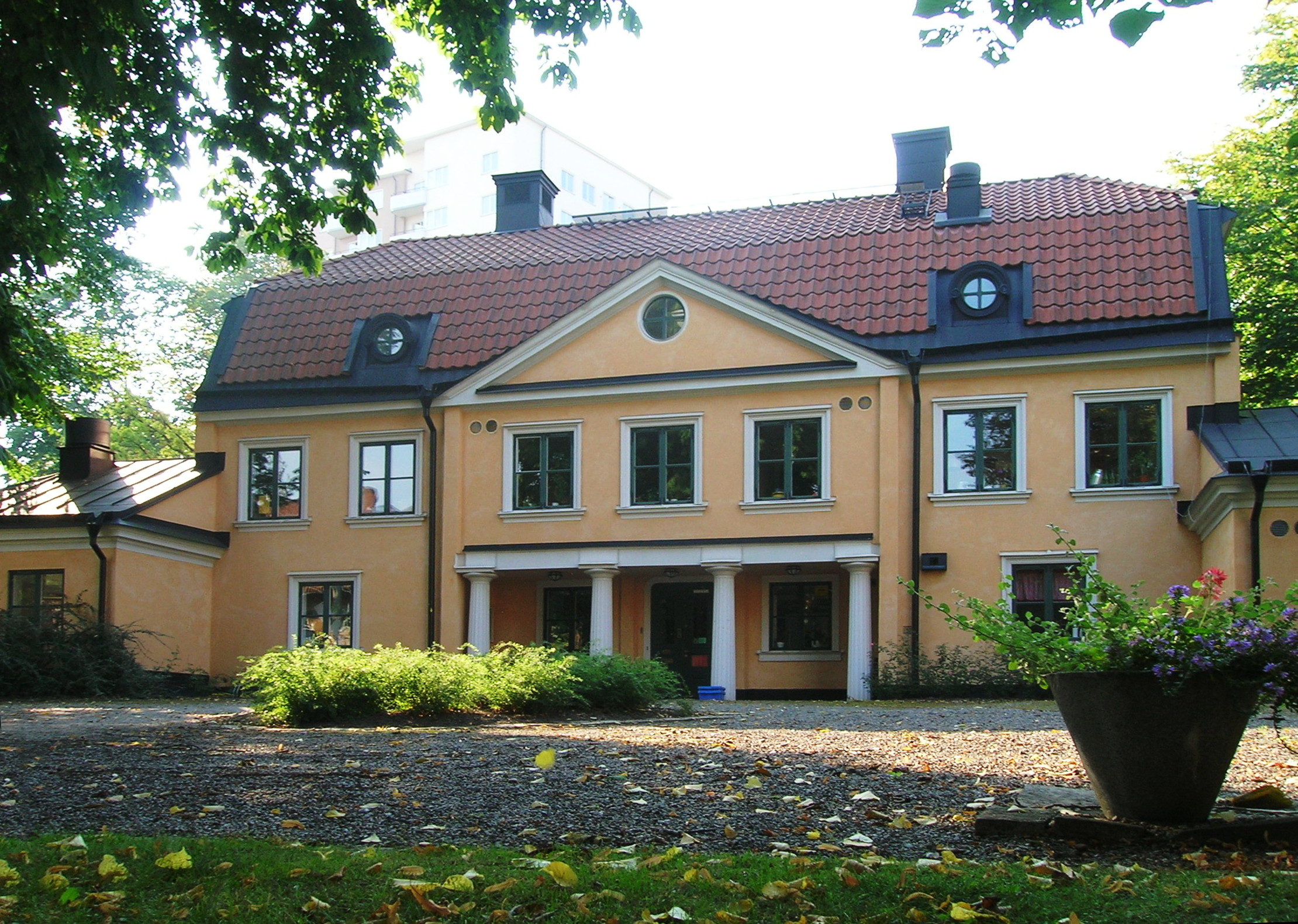
Former estate of Anders Reimer, during World War II transformed into a day nursery.

Reimersholme is a small island in central Stockholm, lying to the west of Södermalm and to the south of the neighbouring island Långholmen. As of 2006 Reimersholme is inhabited by 2,324 people, living in 1,527 dwellings, and with an average annual income of SEK 306,500. 12 percent of the inhabitants have a foreign background. Until June 24, 1798 Reimersholme was called Räkneholmen. Its present name refers to Anders Reimers (1727-1816), a hatter and magistrate whose estate can still be found on the east side of the island.

Despite its vicinity to Södermalm, Reimersholme formed part of Brännkyrka parish and Liljeholmen municipality from 1898 until 1912, both of which are now part of the southern suburbs, and was not incorporated into the city of Stockholm until 1913 together with the remaining part of Brännkyrka. It formed part of the parish of Brännkyrka until 1957 when it became part of Högalid parish, the western part of Södermalm.

The first housing on the island was built in the 1880s close to Charlottenburg. A wool manufacturing plant, Stockholms Yllefabrik, was built during the 1860s where prisoners from Långholmen Prison used to work. The factory was declared bankrupt in 1934 and the area was bought by HSB, a corporative housing association, in 1939. HSB had 900 apartments built on the northern and eastern part of the island during the period 1942–1946. In the 1980s the remaining southern part of the island, previously a site occupied by the alcohol manufacturer Reymersholms Spritförädlings AB, was transformed into a housing area.

Reimersholme is connected to Stockholm by the bridge Reimersholmsbron, which is 39 meters long and 13 meters wide. Bus services to the city have been operated since 1967 by bus line 66 and since 1986 by bus line 40. In 2015, the bus line 40 was discontinued and replaced with the new line 54.

== See also ==
- Reimersholmsbron
- Stockholm Municipality
