= Långholmen =

Island and urban district in Stockholm, Sweden

Coordinates: 59°19′16″N 18°01′40″E

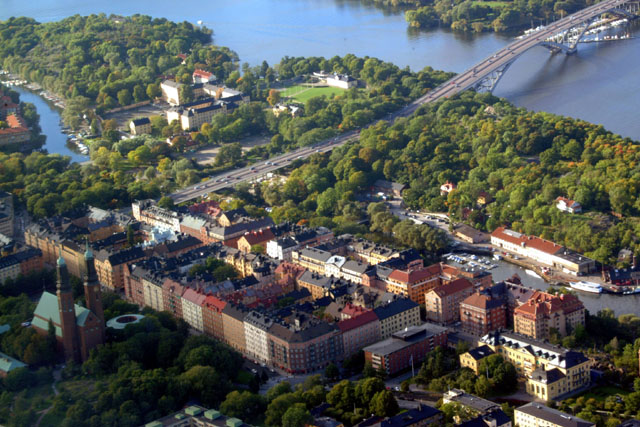
Aerial view of Långholmen

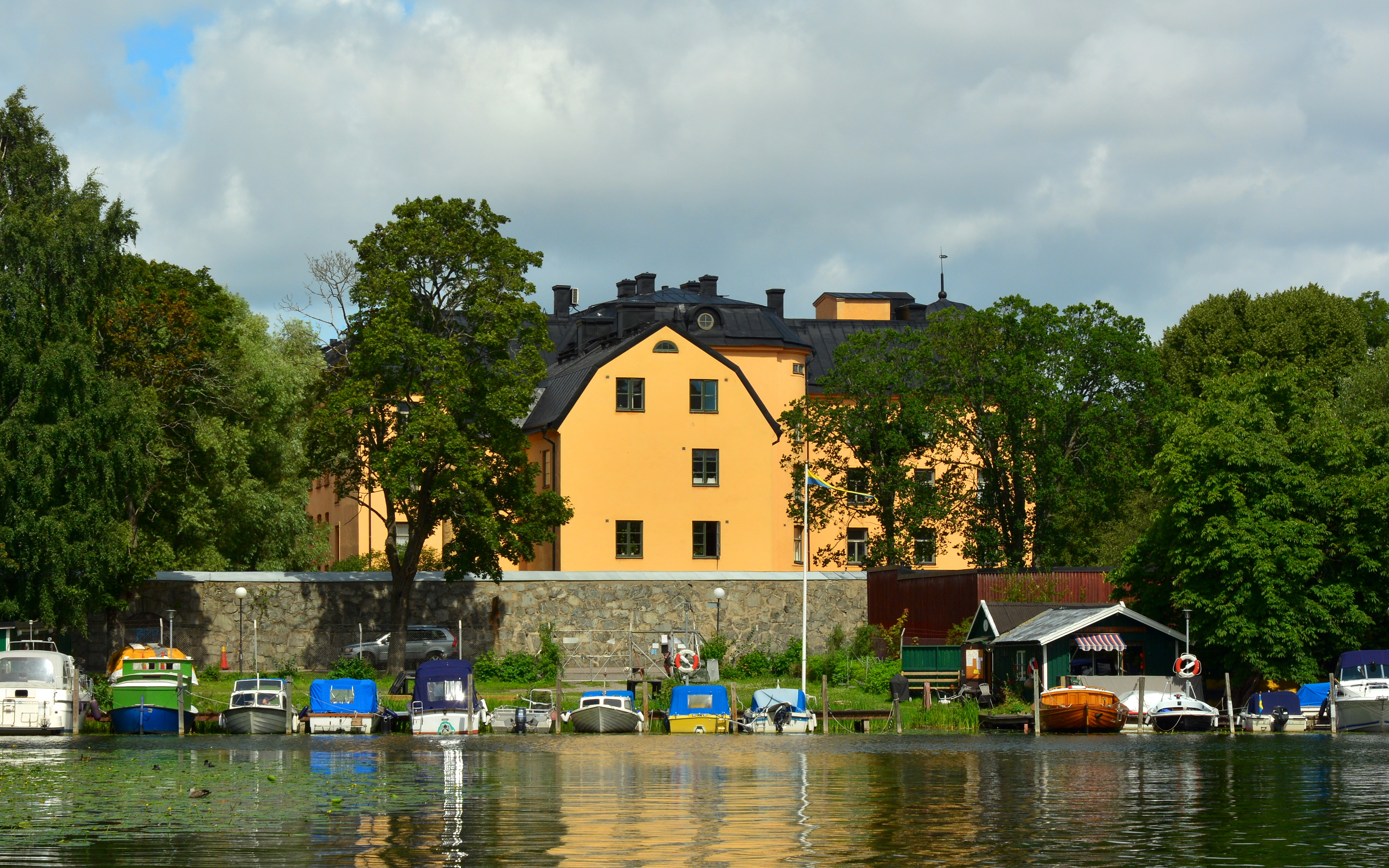
Långholmens spinnhus on Långholmen

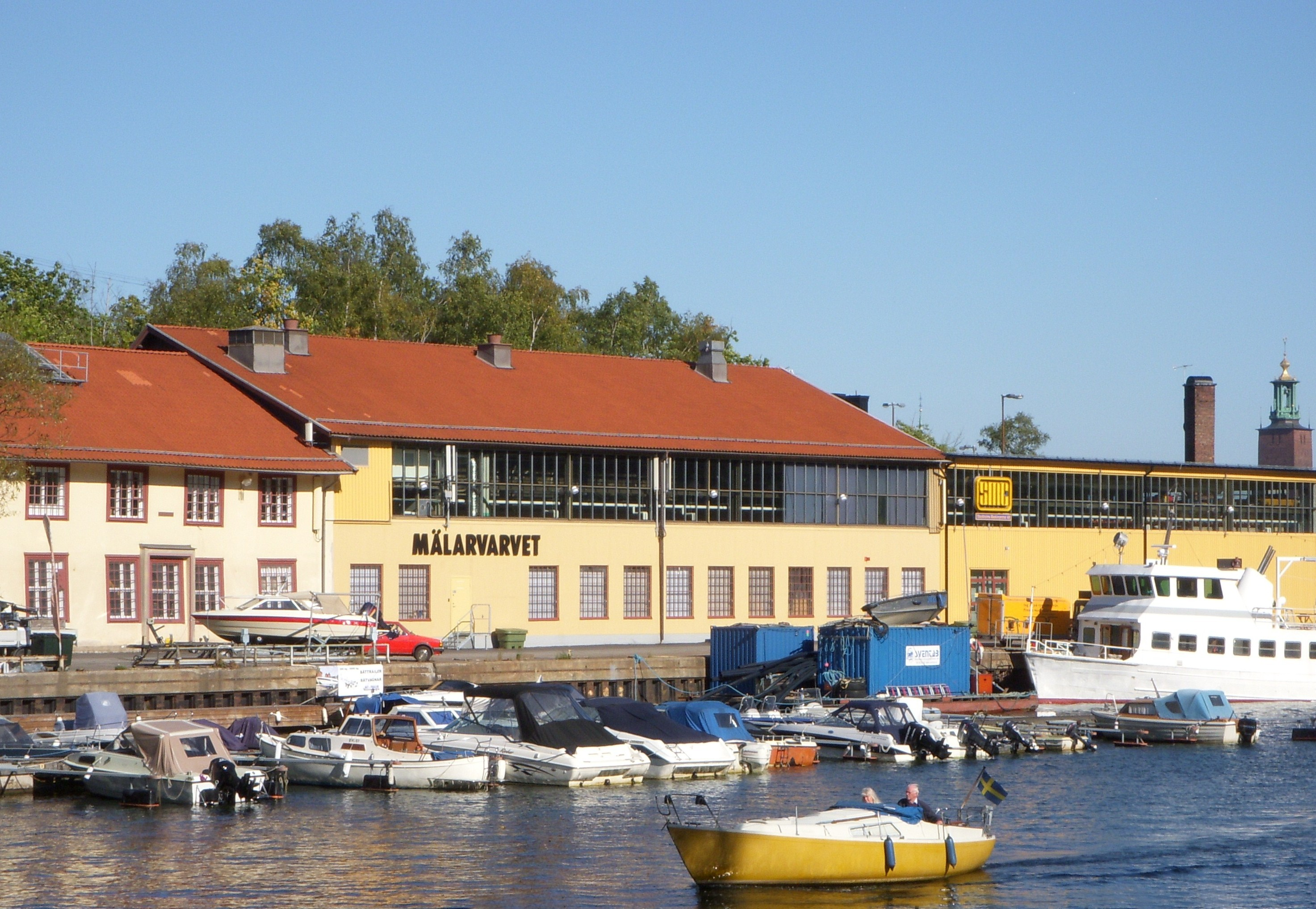
Mälarvarvet shipyard on Långholmen

Långholmen is an island between two other islands, Södermalm and Kungsholmen, in central Stockholm, Sweden. This island can be reached via two bridges; Pålsundsbron in the east and Långholmsbron in the west. Långholmen is a popular spot for walks, picnics and swimming. The small beaches, located right outside the former prison, are usually crowded in summer.

== History ==
Långholmens spinnhus was a women's prison on Långholmen. The prison was established in 1649 when the Malmgården in Alstavik at Långholmen was erected and was closed in 1825. The building became state property in 1724 and was used as a spinning house (spinnhus). In 1825 the spinnhus was relocated to Norrmalm. After the move, Långholmen Prison started to operate on the grounds. Långholmen Prison was built 1874—1880 as the central prison of Sweden, and was temporary closed down between 1972—1975. Since 1989, Långholmen Prison has been a 112-room hotel and hostel, renovated between 2007-2008.

Långholmen was originally rocky and barren. It was used as a temporary military camp for soldiers serving in the Swedish Army fleet during the Russo-Swedish War (1788–1790). During the 19th century prison inmates covered the island with mud dredged from the surrounding waterways. After several years, the fertile soil transformed much of the island into lush gardens with a somewhat exotic flora, due to the introduction of various seeds that were spread via trade and merchant ships passing by the island.

Mälar shipyard (Mälarvarvet) is a shipyard on Långholmen's southeast side. The shipyard dates back to the 1680s. It was one of the major shipyards in Stockholm during the first half of the 19th century. Mälarvarvet had several private owners but is now in the ownership of the City of Stockholm.

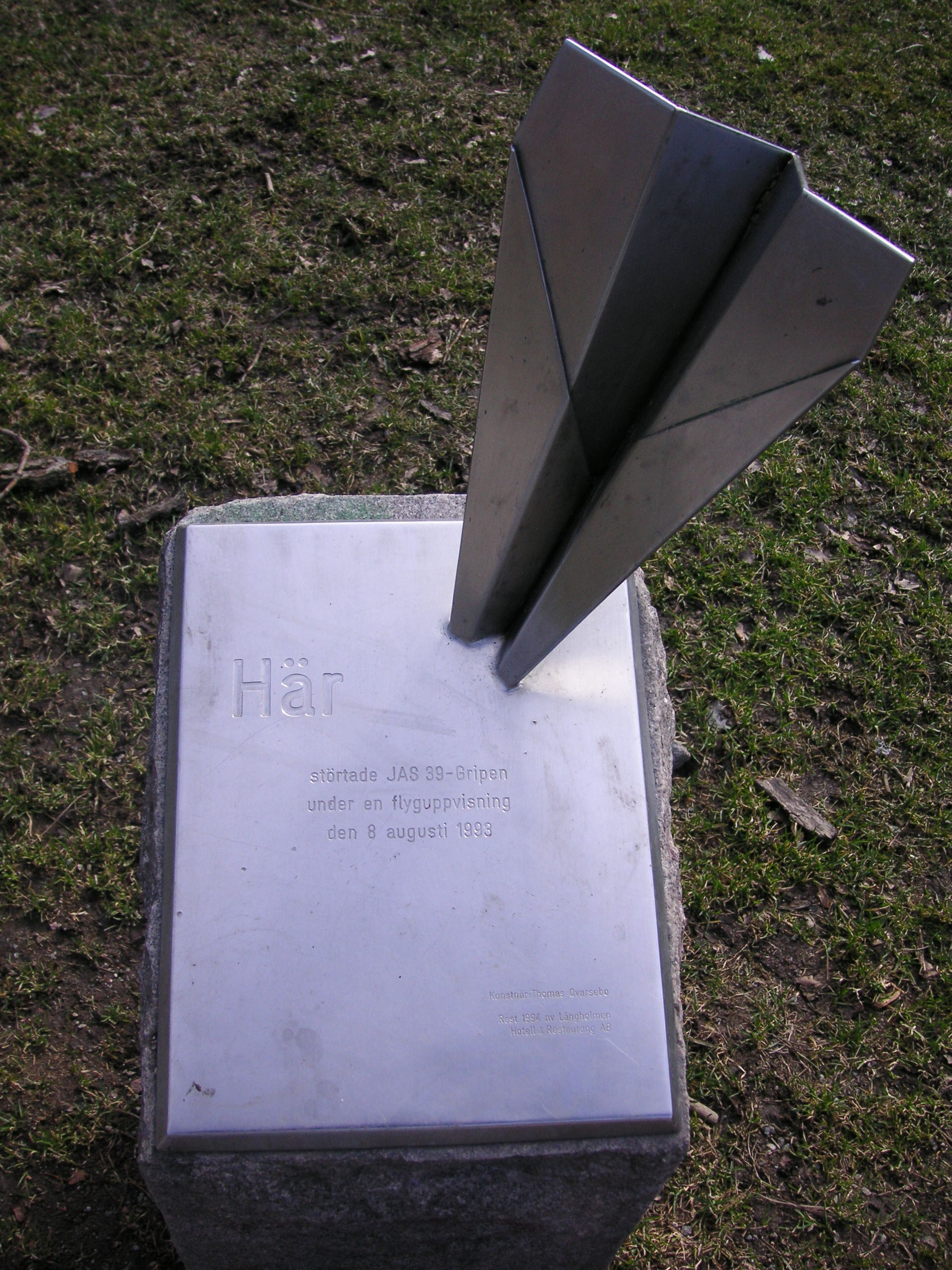
The JAS monument next to Västerbron

On 8 August 1993 a JAS 39 Gripen fighter aircraft crashed on Långholmen during a display at the Stockholm Water Festival. The plane caught fire on impact, but the fire was soon put out. The pilot successfully ejected, and despite large crowds of spectators, only one person was injured. A sculpture in stainless steel by Thomas Qvarsebo, depicting a paper plane with its nose drilled into the ground, was placed on the spot in 1994.

Långholmen Football club was founded in 2002 and is now an important part of the sporting and social life of the expatriate community in Stockholm. The club was founded by a group of expats who regularly met on the gravel pitch on the island. Although English is generally the main language used by Långholmen players and the majority of members have tended to be from the British Isles, the club has always been proud of its international mix of players. The decision to have the club's home shirt with black and white stripes is indeed homage to the island and its history. Having started out in Stockholm Division 8, the lowest football league at the time, Långholmen Football club have achieved numerous promotions and will now play in the Swedish national football league Swedish football league system in Division 3 Östra Svealand.

== See also ==
- Långholmsbron
- Pålsundsbron
- Reimersholme
- Västerbron
- Långholmens spinnhus
