= Gullmarsplan =

Square in Stockholm, Sweden

Coordinates: 59°17′55″N 18°4′52″E

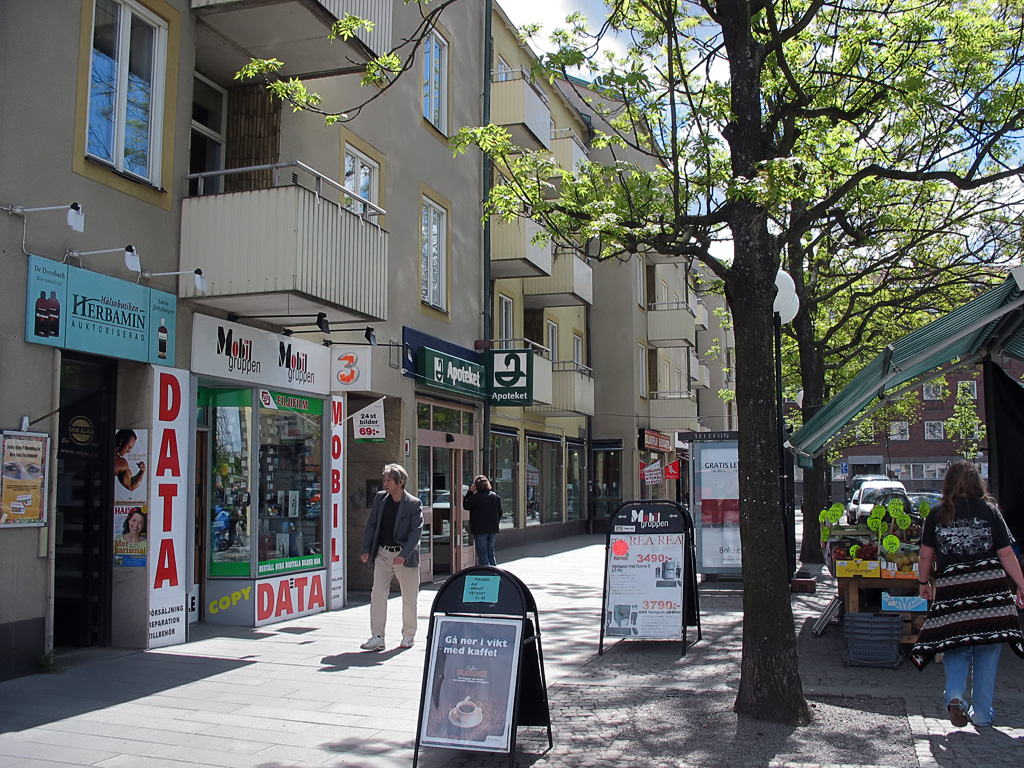
Gullmarsplan

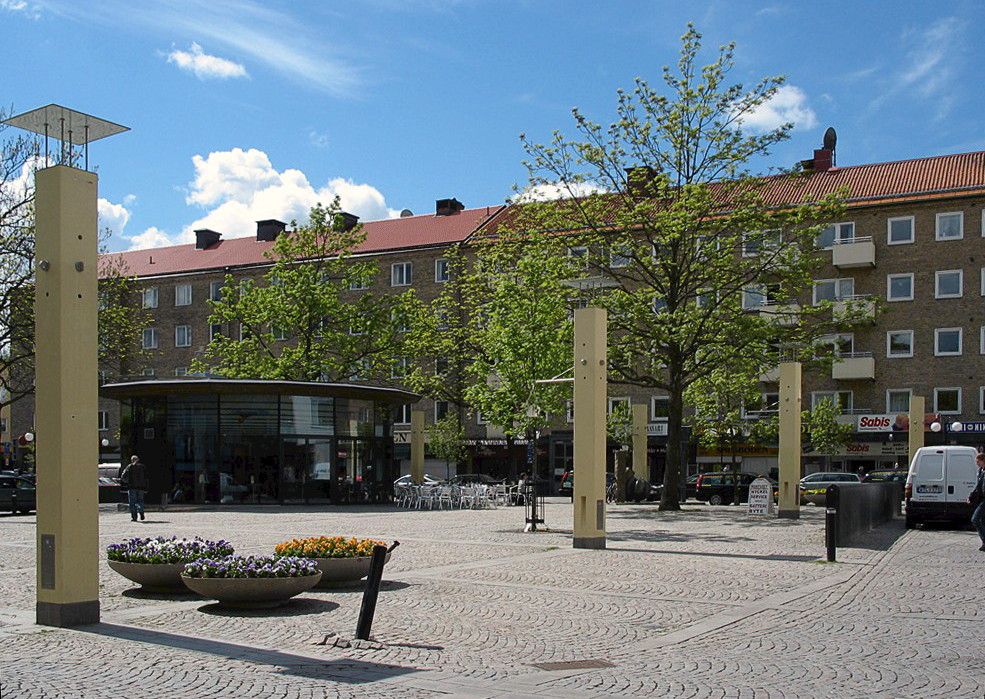
The square in May, 2006.

Gullmarsplan is a place in Johanneshov, Stockholm. The square there was built at the same time the new city area was developed in the 1940s. The business area around the square was inaugurated in 1946. It was named after Gullmarn, a fjord in the province of Bohuslän, at Lysekil.

The Skanstullsbron (Skanstull bridge) and Johanneshovsbron (Johanneshov bridge) connect Gullmarsplan by road with Södermalm, a part of the city center. Beneath Gullmarsplan, the road tunnel Södra länken runs in an east-west direction. Just south of Gullmarsplan is the Söderstadion football stadium as well as the Avicii Arena (Globen).

== Public transportation hub ==
The most prominent feature of Gullmarsplan is the large public transport hub, which provides access to and between the Stockholm Metro (Tunnelbanan) green lines, Tvärbanan light rail, and a large number of bus lines mainly to and from Tyresö, Haninge, Årsta and Södermalm. The Metro station was inaugurated on 1 October 1950 as the fourth station of the Stockholm Metro. Previously, Gullmarsplan had been a station for the light rail system that preceded the subway.

== Event ==
- The Stockholm Japan Expo is an annual expo held in Gullmarsplan to showcase Japanese culture and arts.
