= Alviksbron =

Box girder bridge in Stockholm, Sweden

Coordinates: 59°19′36″N 17°59′11″E

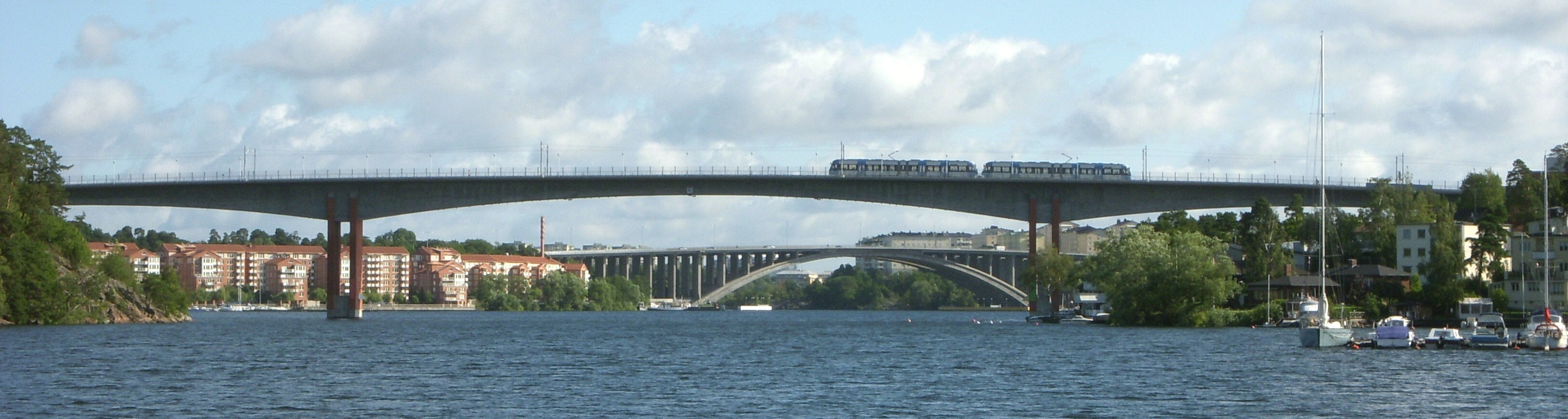

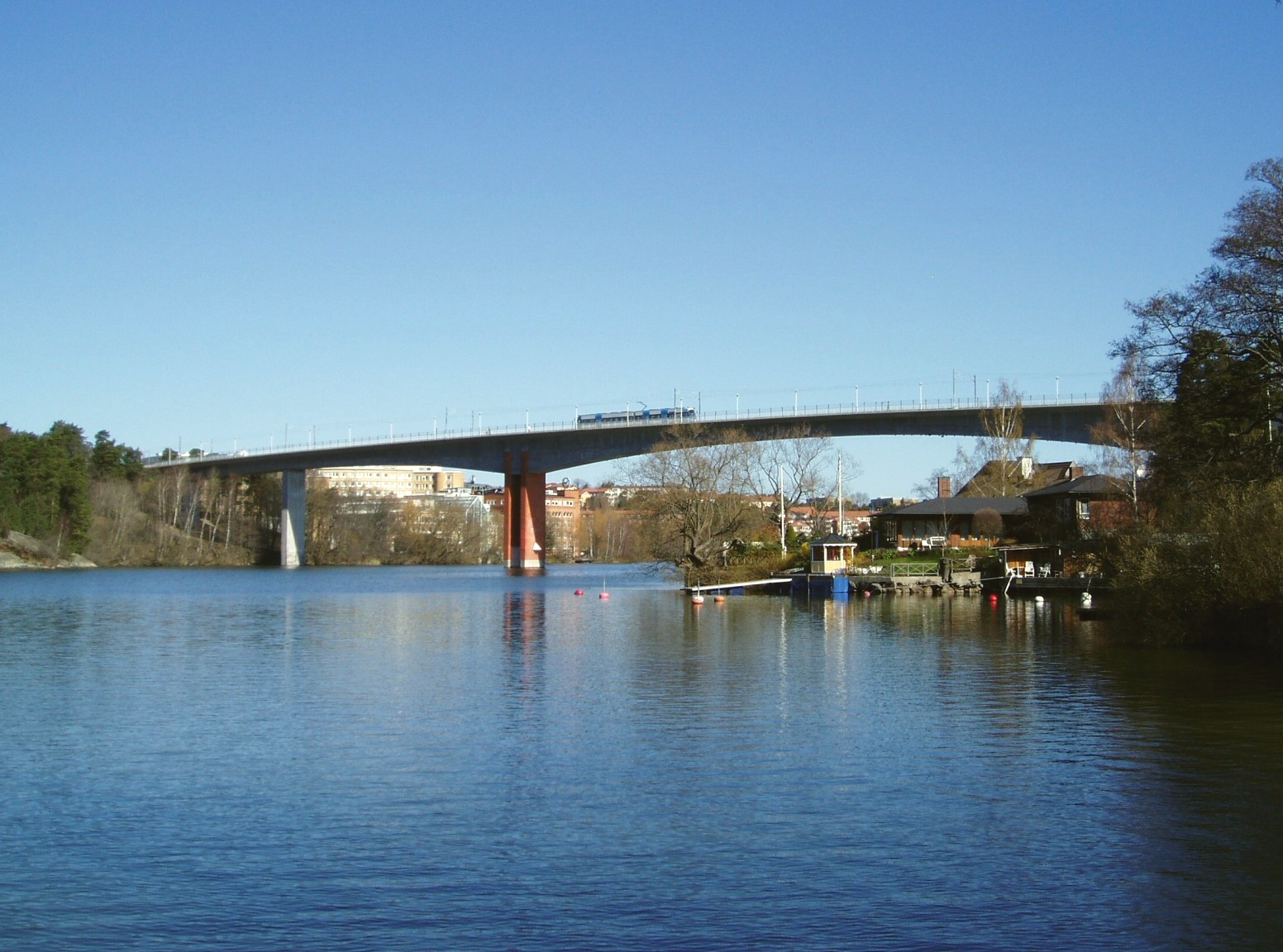
Alviksbron

Alviksbron (Swedish for The Alvik Bridge) is a box girder bridge in central Stockholm, Sweden. Stretching over Oxhålssundet, it connects Stora Essingen island to the western suburb Bromma. Built 1996-1998 by the Nordic Construction Company at a cost of 180 million SEK, it has served the Tvärbanan light rail line and pedestrians and bicyclists since its inauguration in August 2000. The name is derived from Alvik, originally a local manor house built in 1819 and demolished in 1930.

The bridge is 400 metres in length with a 140-metre central span and a horizontal clearance of 24 metres. The underside of the bridge tie forms an arch intended to make the bridge as slender as possible. The two pillars standing in the water each consist of two thin concrete plates dressed in two-quarters brick with a common concrete foundation. They are illuminated after dark.

The construction is pre-tensioned longitudinally by cables, but non-tensioned across. The topside was stretched as the separate sections were added, while the underside was stretched after all the sections had been cast into a single compact unit.

Three years after the inauguration crack formations were discovered in the bridge. The shear fissures in the ribs had an angle of 25-30° and a length of 0.1-0.3 mm, and were found in greater number on the south side. This is thought to indicate that compressive stress from the longitudinal stressing in combination with heat from the sun caused the problem. The bridge was then reinforced, first temporarily using outside pre-stressing bars, and then permanently using carbon fibre laminates in sections with minor fissures, and tie struts in the worst affected sections.

== See also ==
- List of bridges in Stockholm
- Skansbron
- Gröndalsbron
- Fredriksdalsbron
