= List of bridges in Stockholm =

This is a list of some of the most notable bridges and viaducts in Stockholm, starting with those located closest to the city centre. Many more bridges and viaducts could, of course, be added, including those on the rail and motorway networks, and the many grade-separated junctions in the suburbs which are a product of postwar city planning.

== Over Mälaren and Stockholms ström ==
- Norrbro
- Stallbron
- Riksbron
- Vasabron
- Strömsborgsbron
- Riddarholmsbron
- Centralbron (two bridges)
- Hebbes Bro
- Slussen (several bridges)
- Strömbron
- Skeppsholmsbron
- Kastellholmsbron
- Beckholmsbron
- Västerbron (two bridges and one viaduct)
- Mariebergsbron (formerly Lilla Essingebron)
- Långholmsbron
- Pålsundsbron
- Reimersholmsbron
- Tranebergsbron (three bridges)
- Essingeleden (an 8-km motorway, 4 km of which consists of bridges and viaducts)
- Fredhällsbron (part of Essingeleden)
- Essingebron (part of Essingeleden)
- Gröndalsbron (two bridges: part of Essingeleden and Tvärbanan)
- Alviksbron (part of Tvärbanan)

== Over Klara sjö, Barnhusviken and Bällstaviken ==
- Stadshusbron
- Klarabergsviadukten
- Kungsbron
- Blekholmsbron
- Barnhusbron
- Sankt Eriksbron
- Ekelundsbron (formerly Karlbergsbron)
- Huvudstabron
- Fredriksdalsbron (part of Tvärbanan)

== Over Djurgårdsbrunnsviken ==
- Djurgårdsbron
- Djurgårdsbrunnsbron
- Lilla Sjötullsbron

== Over Årstaviken, Hammarby Sjö and Sicklasjön ==
- Danviksbron (two bridges)
- Skansbron
- Skanstullsbron
- Johanneshovsbron
- Årstabroarna (two bridges)
- Liljeholmsbron (two bridges)
- Sickla kanalbro
- Sicklauddsbron
- Sickla Allébro

== Over other waterways ==
- Morianbron
- Laduviksbron
- Ålkistebron
- Lidingöbron (two bridges)
- Husarbron

== On Land ==
- Malmskillnadsbron (taking Malmskillnadsgatan over Kungsgatan)
- Regeringsgatans bro (taking Regeringsgatan over Kungsgatan)
- Solnabron
- Fredriksdalsbron (part of Tvärbanan)

== Historical ==
- Sveabron (where present-day Odengatan passes over Sveavägen)
- Nybro or Stora Ladugårdslandsbron (across today's Berzelii Park)
- Näckströms bro (connecting Norrmalm and Blasieholmen)

Additionally, during the cold winters in the 19th century, ice in the city harbour made it necessary to replace ferries by temporary pontoon bridges sometimes more than 300 m in length.

== See also ==
- Geography of Stockholm
