= Pile bridge =

Type of bridge

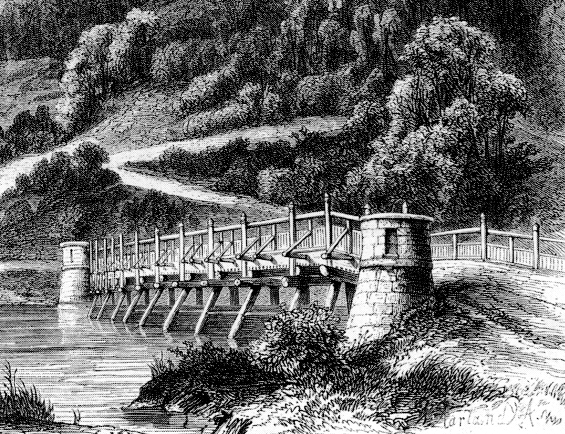
- A pile bridge in Germany, c.1865
- Carries: Pedestrians, Automobiles, Livestock
- Span range: Short to long
- Material: Wood, Concrete, or Steel
- Movable: Generally no, but possibly has movable lift sections for watercraft passage
- Design effort: usually low
- Falsework required: usually not used

A pile bridge is a structure that uses foundations consisting of long poles (referred to as piles), which are made of wood, concrete or steel and which are hammered into the soft soils beneath the bridge until the end of the pile reaches a hard layer of compacted soil or rock. Piles in such cases are hammered to a depth where the grip or friction of the pile and the soil surrounding it will support the load of the bridge deck. Bridging solely using the pile method is a rare occurrence today.

== Roman pile bridges ==
Pile bridges have been used to cross rivers and other geological chasms since at least the time of the Roman Empire. One such bridge was probably Pons Sublicius thought to have been first created around 642BC, although being made of wood; this bridge and none of the other Roman bridges of the period have survived the erosion of time.

== Construction during medieval times ==
During the English Middle Ages bridge building was a booming activity. Groups of piles, usually made of elm or oak were driven together into the soil. The pile hammer was a construction that allowed a heavy weight to fall on the top of the pile. Each pile wore a "pile shoe" tip made of iron. A group so hammered was called a "straddle" and atop as well as surrounding the straddle was a pile supported platform called a "starling" which was filled with rubble before the pier and bridge deck were added.

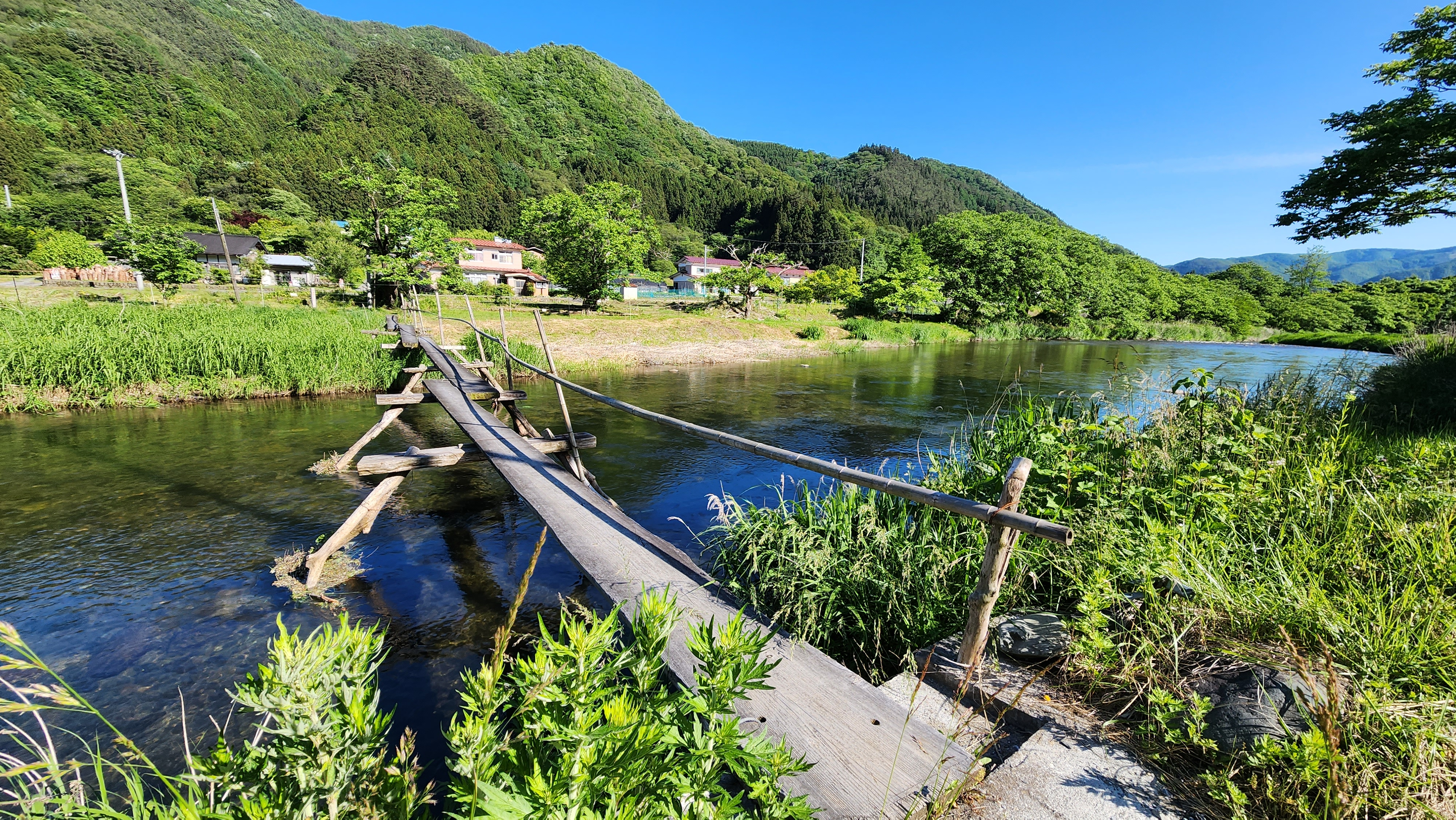
A wooden pedestrian bridge spanning the Kesen River Sumita, Iwate, Japan

== Duration of pile bridges ==
Perhaps one of the most well-known of the medieval pile bridges, and one that was probably similarly constructed as a pile bridge by the Romans, are the older versions of London Bridge. However, even when the first version of the bridge as a stone structure was commenced during the reign of Henry II in 1176, oak piles were used as part of the construction. Indeed, some of those piles while driven in 1176 were still sturdy enough to be drawn in 1921, almost 750 years later.

== See also ==
- Fredriksdalsbron, a modern bridge using steel point-bearing piles
- Dolphin (structure)
