= ISSR =

ISSR may refer to:

- International Society for Science and Religion
- inter-simple sequence repeat, a general term for a genome region between microsatellite loci.
- Institute of Statistical Studies and Research
- International School of the Stockholm Region
- The Iranian Soviet Socialist Republic, a short-lived unrecognized state.
