= Johanneshovsbron =

Bridge in central Stockholm, Sweden

Coordinates: 59°18′03″N 18°04′37″E

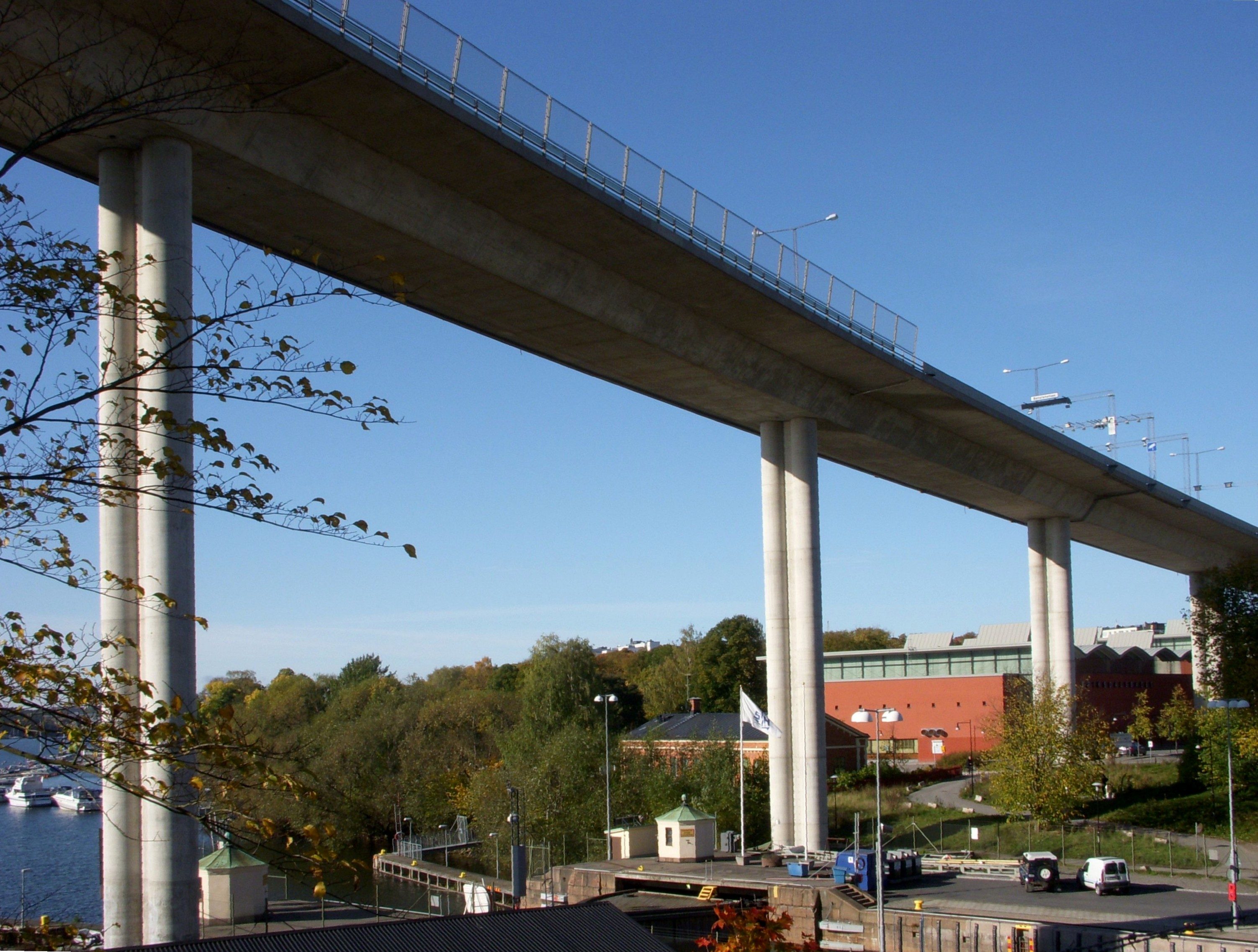
Johanneshovsbron in Stockholm 2008

Johanneshovsbron (Swedish: "The Johanneshov Bridge") is a 756 metres long and 17,9 metres wide road bridge in central Stockholm, Sweden. Overpassing two older bridges, Skansbron and Skanstullsbron, and one newer bridge, Fredriksdalsbron, it connects Södermalm and the tunnel passing under it, Söderledstunneln, to Johanneshov, the district immediately south of the historical city centre, and national road 73, leading out of the city.

Brought about by the construction of the tunnel, Johanneshovsbron forms part of one of the major roads passing through the central city, extending north over Centralbron. Running south form the mouth of Söderledstunneln to the west of Skanstull, the bridge runs uphill and somewhat in parallel to Skanstullsbron for some 500 metres before it turns east to pass over its neighbour, between which ramps it finally extends into road 37 underneath the roundabout at Johanneshov.

The bridge is made of prestressed concrete, has an average span of 51 metres (max 55,7 metres), and was inaugurated on 9 October 1984.

== See also ==
- List of bridges in Stockholm
- Skansbron
- Skanstullsbron
- Fredriksdalsbron
- Tvärbanan
