= Stockholm Japan Expo =

Japanese cultural expo in Stockholm, Sweden

The Stockholm Japan Expo is an annual expo held in Gullmarsplan in Stockholm to showcase Japanese culture and arts. The three-day event typically runs through the last (usually fourth) Friday of the month May to the consequent Sunday.

== 2009 ==
In 2009, it ran from 22 May till the 24th. The headliner for the event was Japanese rock musician, Miyavi was to perform on 23 May.
