= Skanstullsbron =

Bridge in Stockholm, Sweden

Coordinates: 59°18′04″N 18°04′44″E

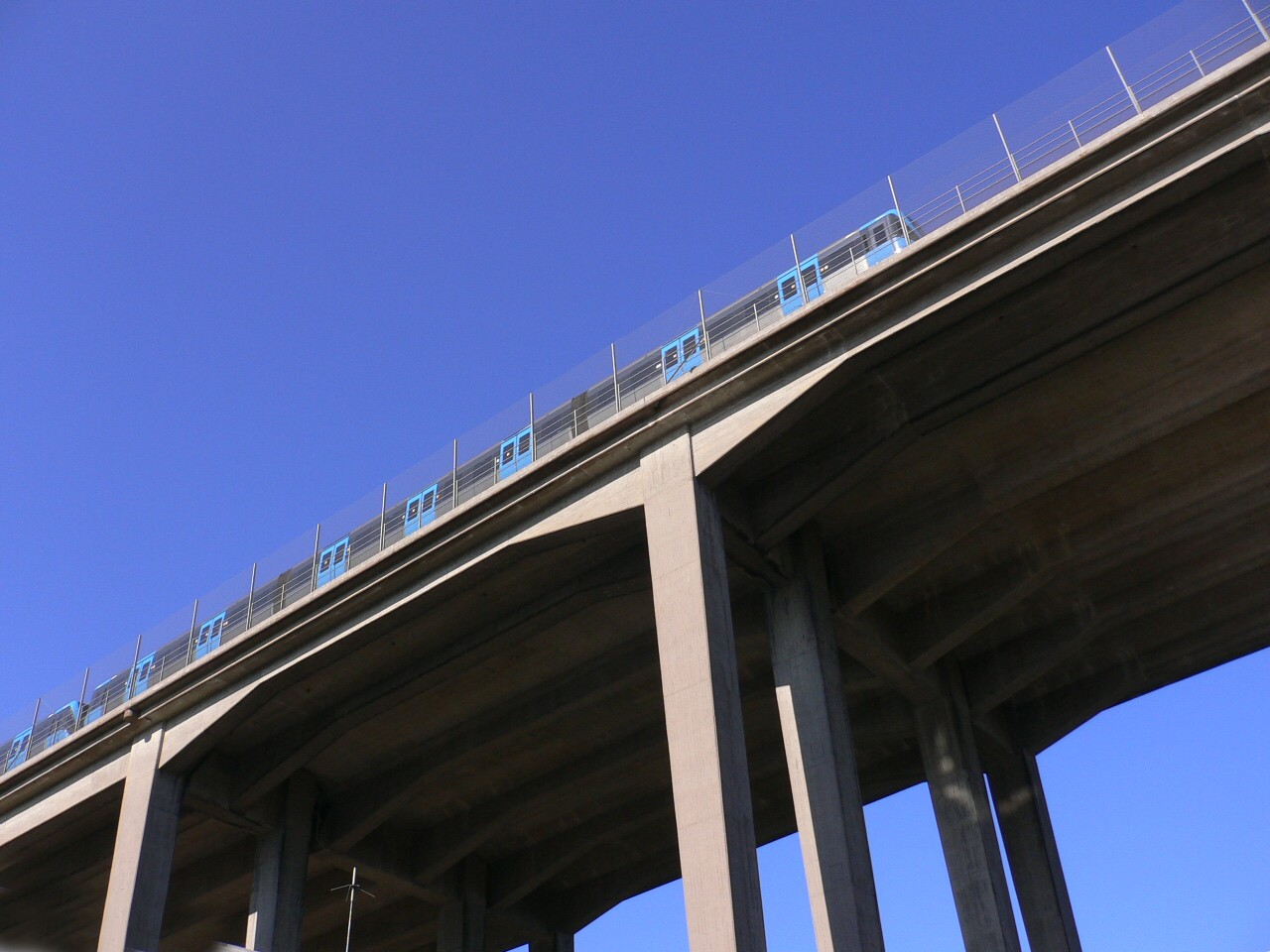
Skanstullsbron in July 2006.

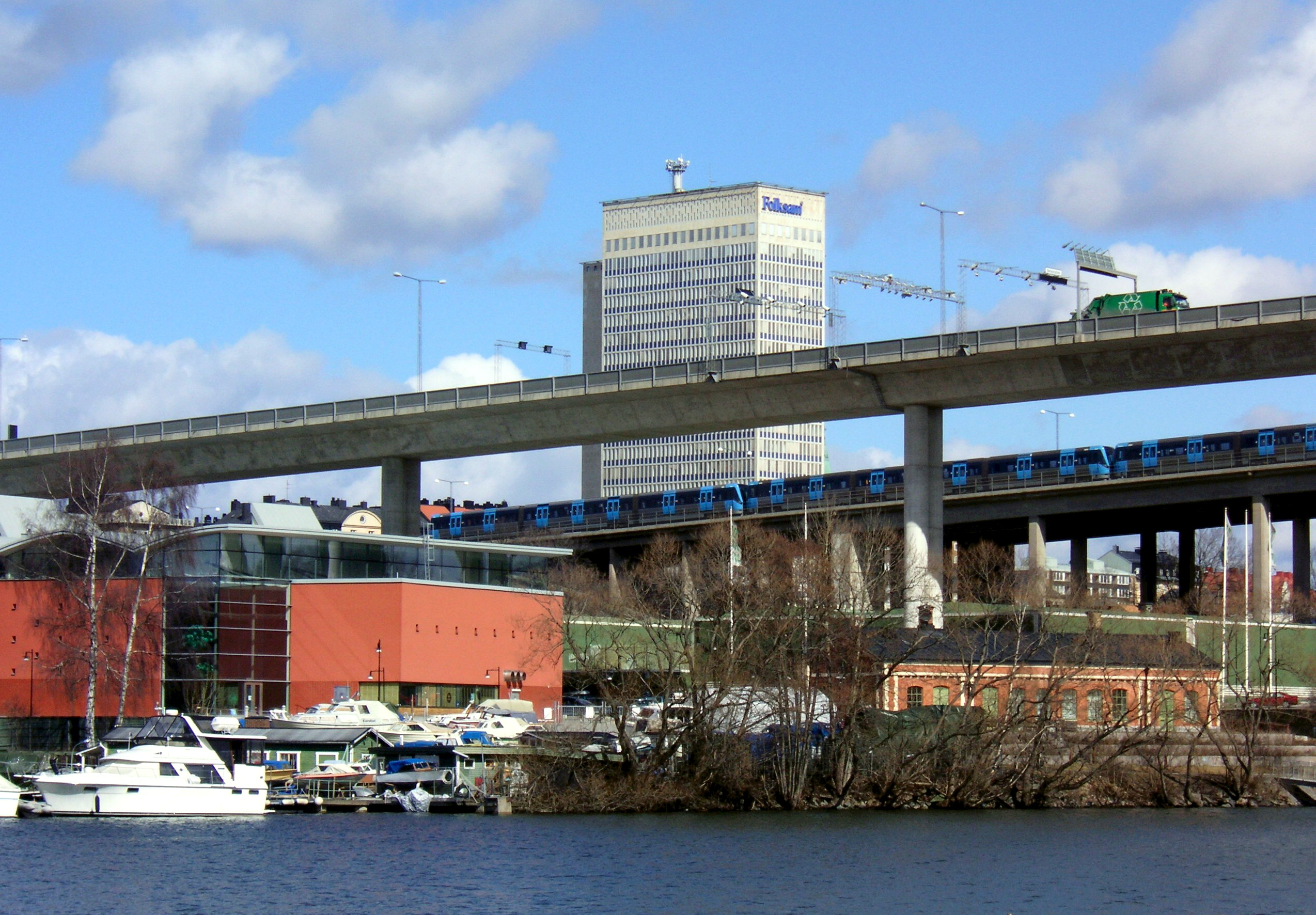
Johanneshovsbron and Skanstullsbron viewed from south-west in April 2006; a metro train is crossing Skanstullsbron.

Skanstullsbron (Swedish: "The Fortlet Tollgate Bridge") is a bridge in central Stockholm, Sweden. Overshadowing the older bridge of Skansbron, it connects Skanstull on the island of Södermalm to the southern district of Johanneshov on the mainland. The bridge carries road traffic together with the Green line of the Stockholm Metro.

The first proposal for an elevated bridge stretching over the canal Hammarbykanalen was produced in 1921, before work on the lower Skansbron bridge began in 1923. It remained the favoured bridge design to solve the increasing traffic load of the area during the 1920s and 1930s and was approved by the city council in 1939. World War II led to shortage of both finance and material, but work was started in 1944 and the new bridge was inaugurated in 1947.

Skanstullsbron is a concrete double viaduct, with one bridge for vehicles and pedestrians and the other for the metro tracks. Its total length is 574 metres of which 403 metres consists of the 16 spans of the southern beam bridge. The three central spans, 118, 112, and 106 metres long, offer a maximum horizontal clearance of 32 metres and a panoramic view of the surrounding city.

To the north, and by road, the Skanstullsbron connects to the Götgatan street that runs north to Slussen on the north shore of Södermalm. Also to the north, the metro descends into Skanstull station before running under Götgatan in the Södertunneln. To the south, road traffic merges with traffic from the adjacent Johanneshovsbron bridge to form national road 73, whilst the metro serves Gullmarsplan station.

South of its crossing of the Hammarbykanalen, the bridge also crosses the curving Fredriksdalsbron viaduct that carries the Tvärbanan light rail line.

== See also ==
- List of bridges in Stockholm
