= International School of the Stockholm Region =

- Main Entrance of ISSR

Location
- Bohusgatan 24-26, SE-116 67 Stockholm; Sweden; 59.306856°N 18.081772°E

Information
- Type: State School
- Established: 1999
- School district: Stockholms Stad
- Head of school: Karin Henrekson-Alberg
- Grades: Kindergarten to 12
- Accreditation: IB
- Website: internationalschoolofthestockholmregion.stockholm.se

The International School of the Stockholm Region (ISSR) is a school in Stockholm, Sweden. It is located on Bohusgatan 24-26, in Skanstull on the island of Södermalm. The school offers the International Baccalaureate Diploma Programme, and is an IB World School and a UNA Sweden School.

== History ==
The school was founded in 1999 by Stockholm Municipality as IB School South, and was renamed in 2012 to its current name.

== Curriculum ==
ISSR is an accredited continuum school that offers four IB programmes, namely the Primary Years Programme, Middle Years Programme, Diploma Programme and the Career-related program (CP).

The International Baccalaureate Primary Years Programme (PYP) - for students aged 3 to 12 focuses on the development of the whole child in the classroom and in the world outside.

The International Baccalaureate Middle Years Programme (MYP) - for students aged 11 to 16 - provides a framework of academic challenge and life skills, achieved through embracing and transcending traditional school subjects.

The International Baccalaureate Diploma Programme (DP) - for students aged 16 to 19 - is a demanding two-year curriculum leading to final examinations and a qualification that is welcomed by leading universities around the world.
