= Solnabron =

Coordinates: 59°20′49″N 18°01′55″E

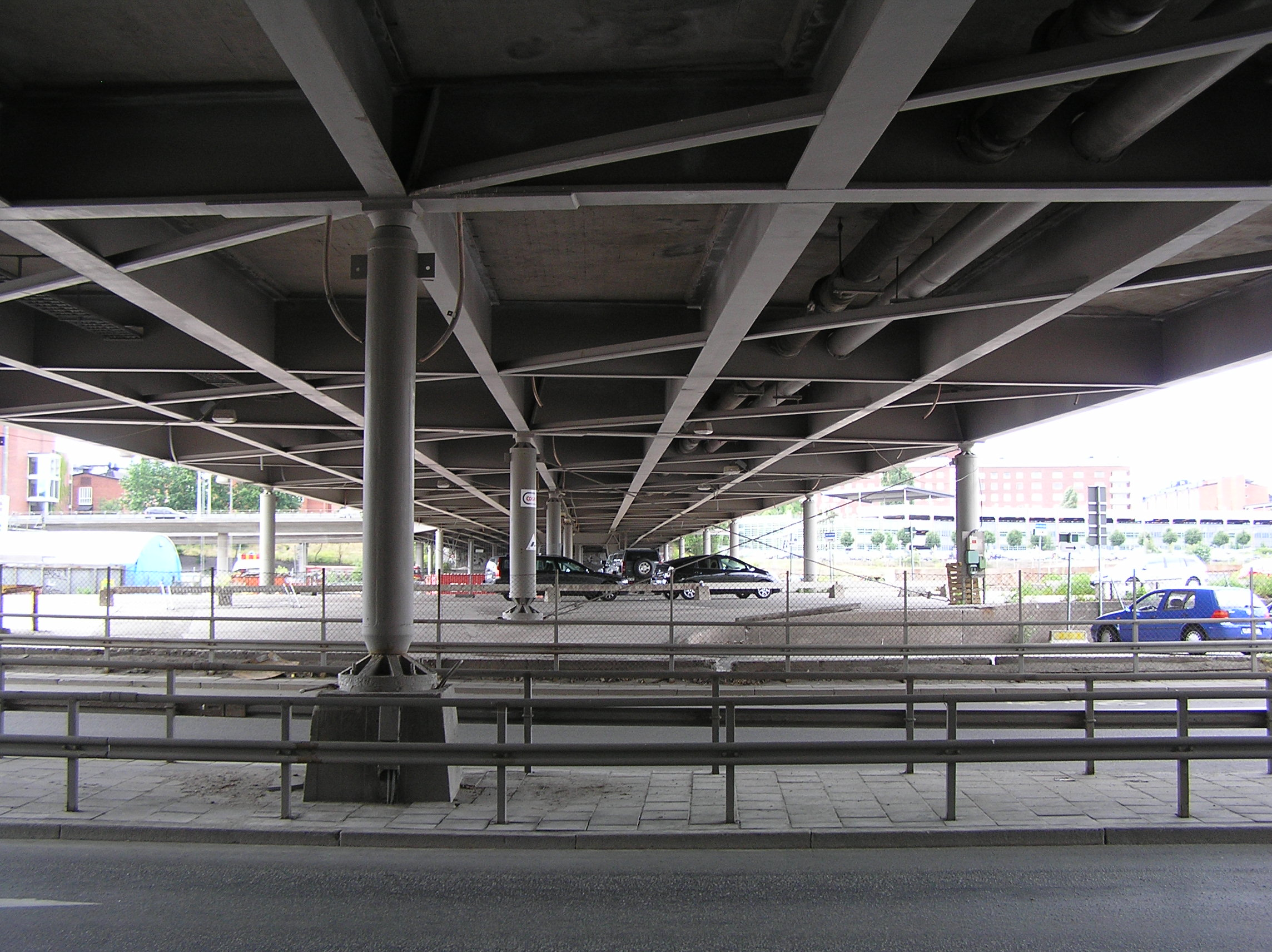
The system of girders supporting Solnabron

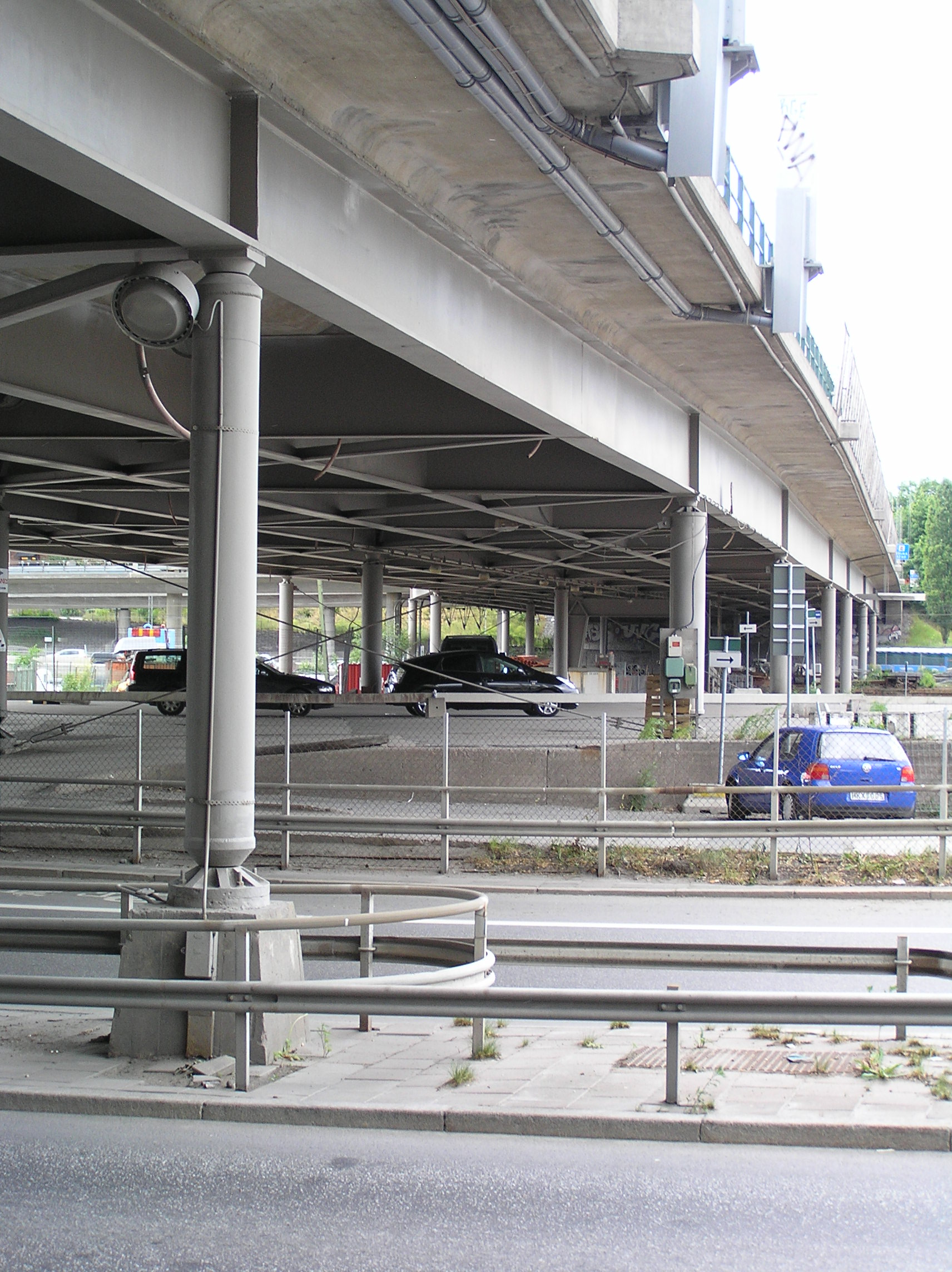
Moveable columns of Solnabron

Solnabron (Swedish: "The Solna Bridge") was a viaduct in Sweden. Spanning the Norra Station area and the Norra länken motorway, it linked the municipalities of Stockholm and Solna. Solnabron was torn down in 2011 as part of large-scale redevelopment of the area into Hagastaden. For a couple of years, it was replaced by a temporary bridge made largely from wood, before finally being replaced with a permanent overbuild. The stretch is now simply designated as Solnavägen ("Solna Road") instead of Solnabron.

When inaugurated in 1942, the bridge opened an important new connection between the two municipalities, just as the hospital and scientific institutions were being collocated with what is today the Karolinska University Hospital, to the north of the bridge.

The viaduct was 230 metres long and 27 metres wide; the roadway was made of a reinforced concrete floor resting on welded iron girders passing over columns pinned at both ends.

During the negotiations preceding the construction, the Swedish State Railway, owner of the rail yard under the bridge, urged that the columns be movable, which would allow the yard to maintain the option of rearranging tracks, as needed. While the bridge was indeed built with movable pillars, the option was never exercised.

== See also ==
- List of bridges in Stockholm
