= Fredriksdalsbron =

Bridge in central Stockholm, Sweden

Coordinates: 59°17′55″N 18°04′45″E

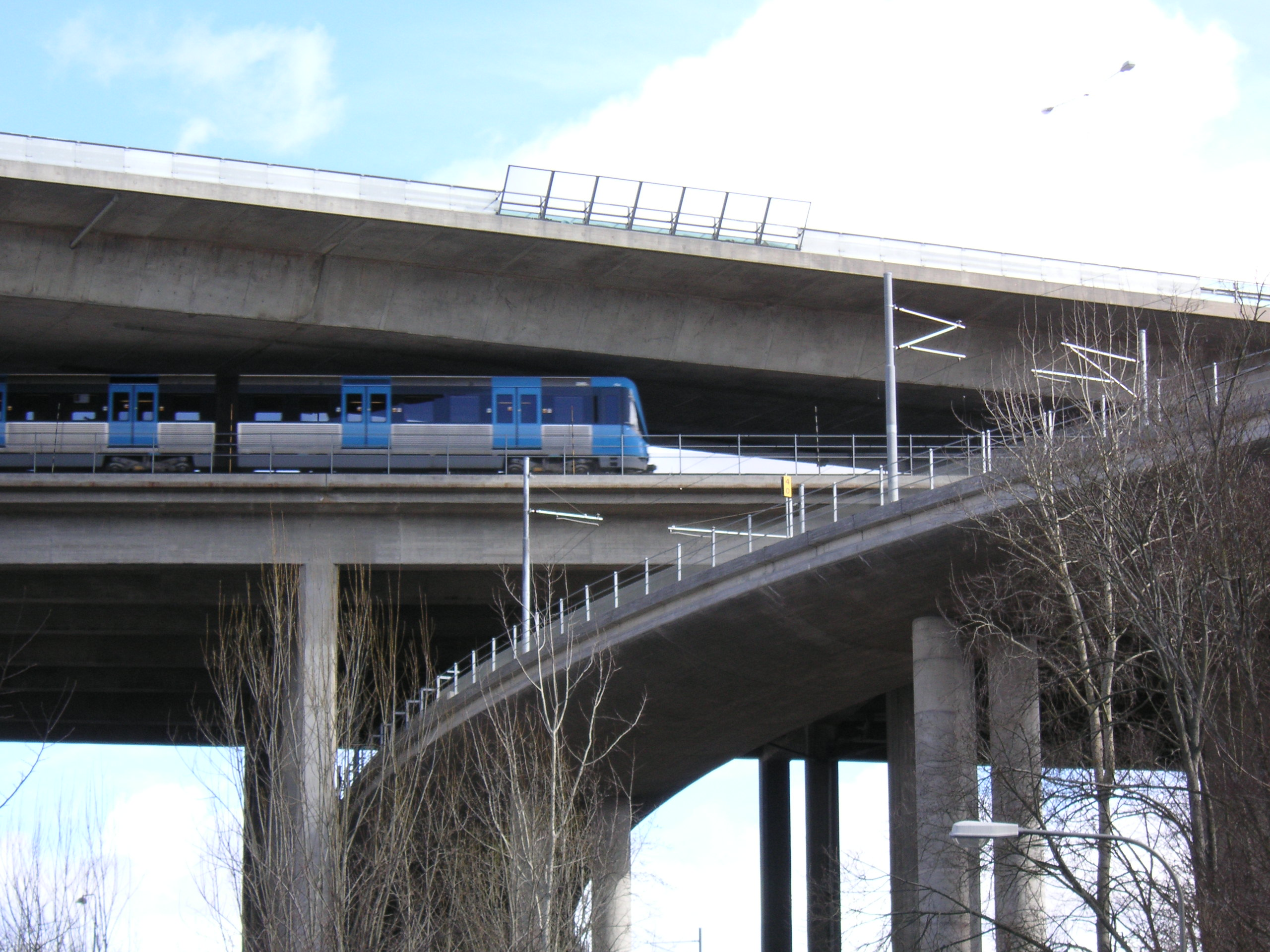
Fredriksdalsbron passing under Johanneshovsbron and Skanstullsbron in April 2006.

Fredriksdalsbron is a bridge in central Stockholm, Sweden. Serving the light rail line Tvärbanan, it stretches north from the station west of the Gullmarsplan metro station, immediately makes a sharp eastward turn to plunge under two other bridges, Skanstullsbron and Johanneshovsbron, to continue eastward over a viaduct leading down to the station Mårtensdal in the newly built suburb Hammarby sjöstad. During the planning process the project name "Kvarnbron" (Mill Bridge) was used.

The bridge was built by Nordic Construction Company (NCC) in 2000–2002 as the first part of an extension of the light rail. 379 metres in length, it rests on 15 pillars of which 2 are anchored into the bedrock while the others are steel point-bearing piles. The bridge deck is formed as a non-tensioned reinforced concrete tray rounded underneath. Abutments and revetments are dressed in slate. The maximum span is 30 metres, and the width varies from 9.4 to 11.4 metres. The longest pillar is slightly more than 20 metres, resting on a foundation mainly composed by poles up to 35 metres in length.

== See also ==
- List of bridges in Stockholm
- Skansbron
- Gröndalsbron
- Alviksbron
