= Skanstull =

Area of Stockholm, Sweden

Coordinates: 59°18′28″N 18°04′33″E

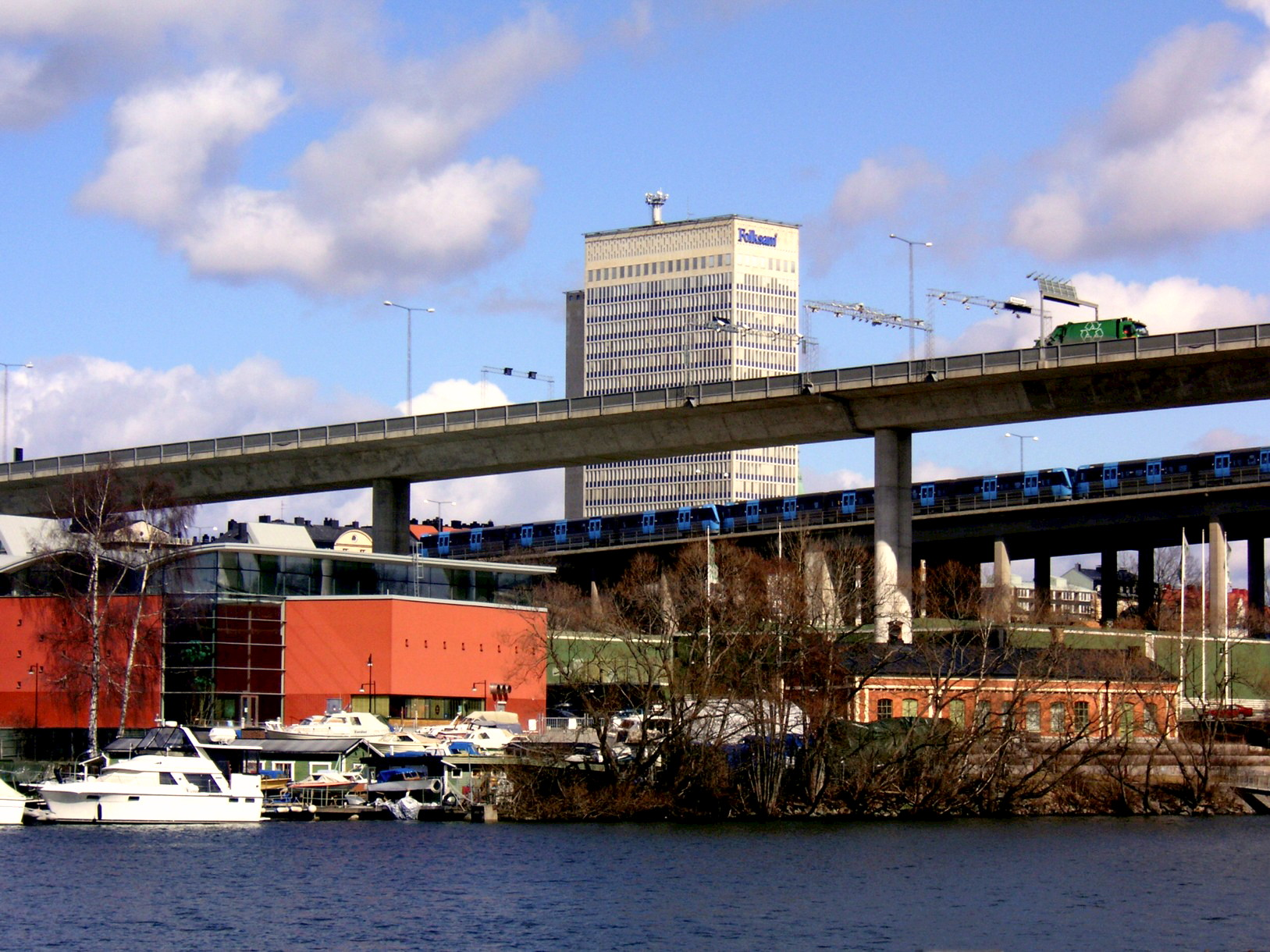
Skanstull 2006

Skanstull (from skans "sconce; small fort" and tull "customs house") is an area in Södermalm in Stockholm. Skanstull connects the traffic between the inner city and the south parts of Stockholm and its suburbs. Skanstull was originally the city's southern toll station, but the toll station was removed in 1857. Skanstull served as an execution site in the 17th century.

Skanstull is the northern bridgehead of three bridges across the Hammarbyleden connecting Södermalm with Johanneshov. From east to west, these are the lower level Skansbron (1925), and the higher level Skanstullsbron (1947) and Johanneshovsbron (1984). All three bridges carry road traffic, and the Skanstullsbron also carries the Green line of the Stockholm Metro.

The Skanstull metro station was opened in 1950, and is served by routes T17, T18, and T19 of the Green line.

Beginning in February 2020, local transmission system operator Svenska kraftnät began construction on a new electrical connection between Skanstull and Anneberg, supporting future electrical needs for the area.

Swedish artist Bladee was raised in the Skanstull area as a child.
