= Skansbron =

Bascule bridge in central Stockholm, Sweden

Coordinates: 59°18′12″N 18°04′47″E

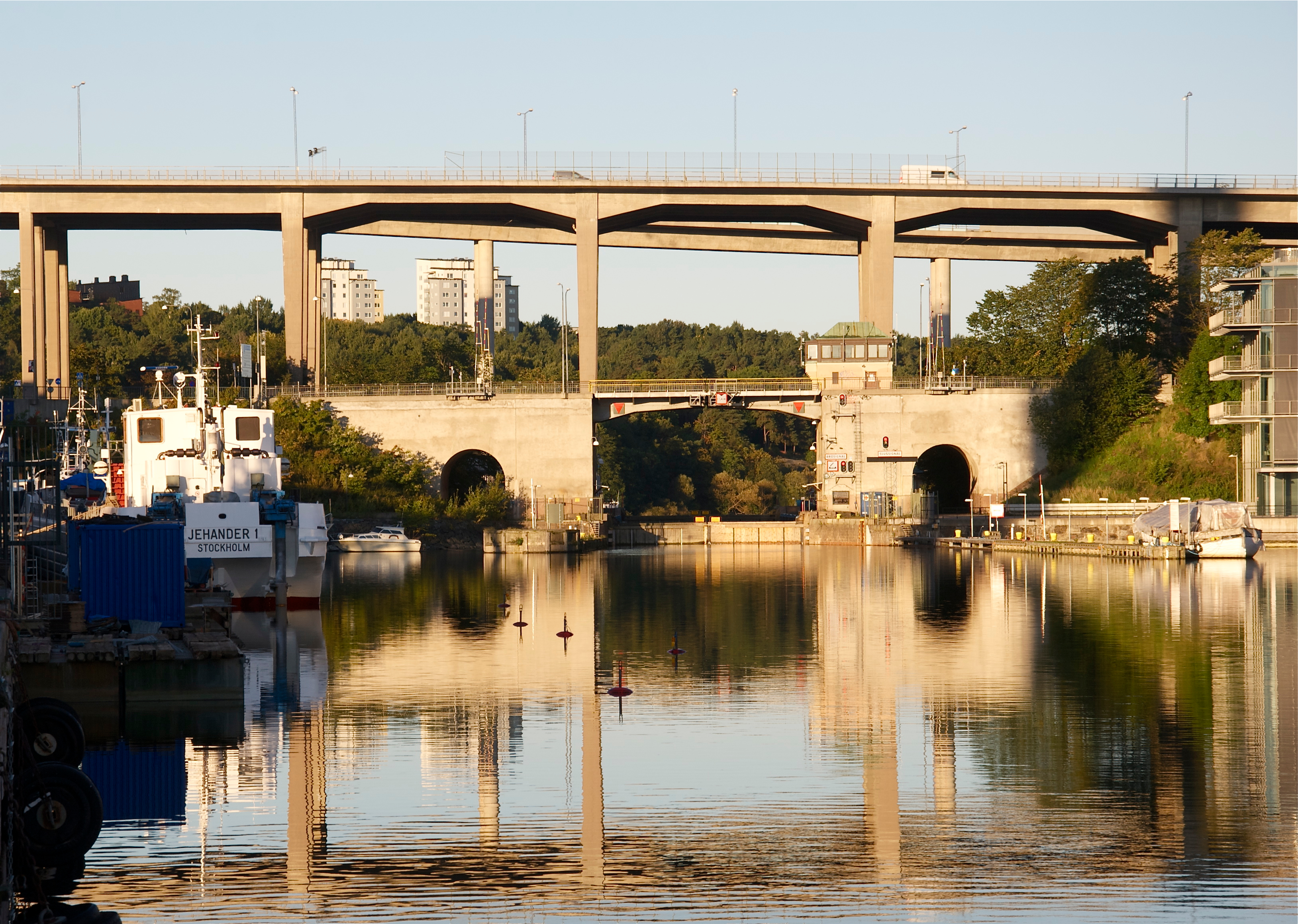
Skansbron in September 2011.

Skansbron (Swedish: "The Fortlet Bridge") is a bascule bridge in central Stockholm, Sweden. Stretching over the canal Hammarbykanalen, it connects the major island Södermalm to the southern mainland district Södra Hammarbyhamnen.

Before the lake Hammarbysjön was transformed into a canal in the 1920s, Skanstull, the southern tollgate of the city, was surrounded by fortifications, including a moat over which a simple wooden bridge led into the city.

In 1914, the City Council had determined the double traffic load at Slussen, caused by west-east going ships and north-south bound vehicles, would be solved by rerouting the ships south of Södermalm through a canal to be built.

Delayed by World War I, the works were finally begun in 1923, and by 1925 a double leaf steel drawbridge was completed. The bridge is 14.9 metres wide with a 10.7-metre wide roadway, and has a horizontal clearance of 12.5 metres.

During the construction of the bridge, the north–south traffic flow was confined to a temporary 98-metre long wooden viaduct with a central main span 32.5 metres long and pipes for water, electricity, gas, and sewer underlying the roadway.

== See also ==
- List of bridges in Stockholm
- Skanstullsbron
- Johanneshovsbron
- Fredriksdalsbron
