= Tvärbanan =

Light rail line in Stockholm, Sweden

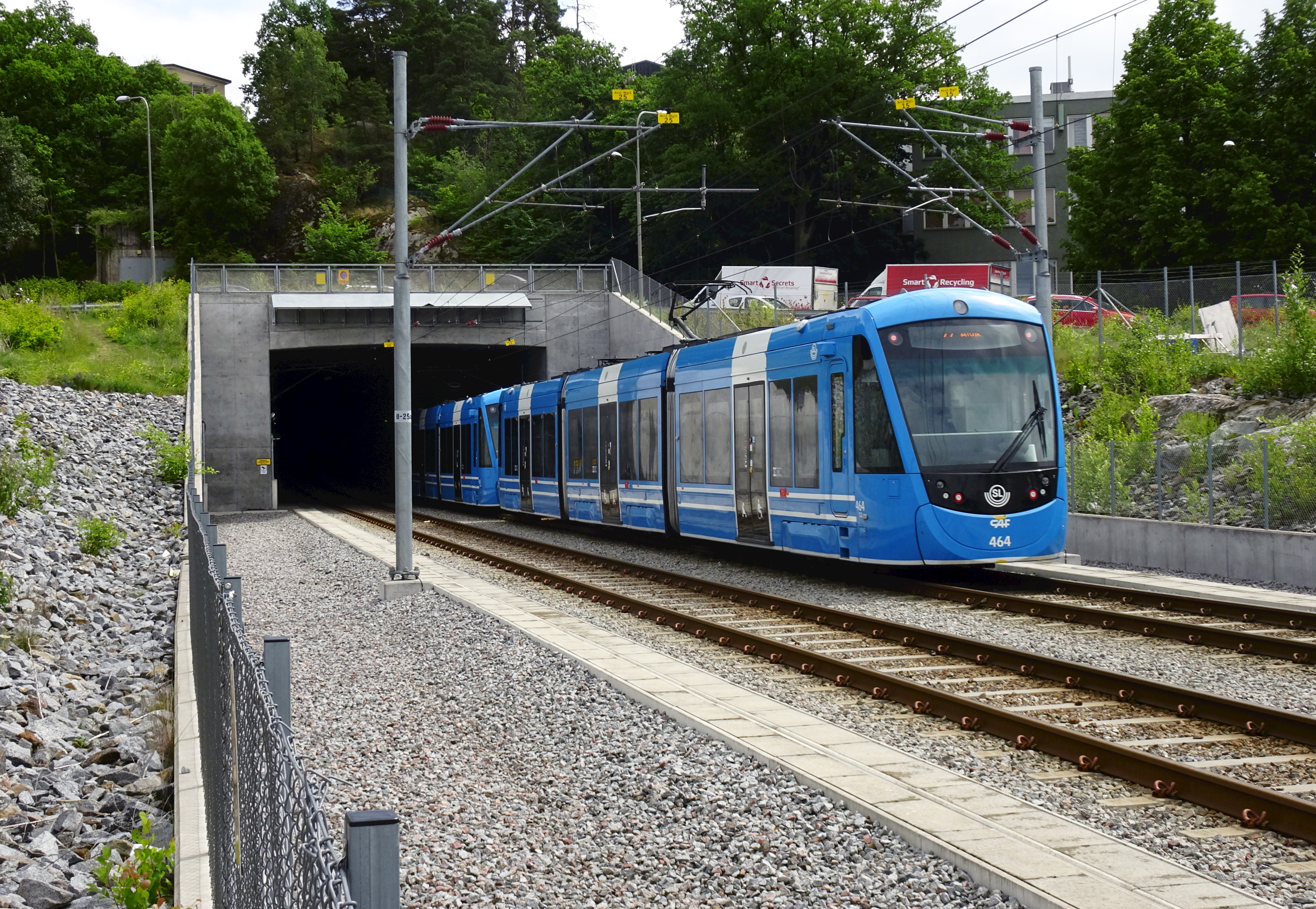

Overview
- Owner: Region Stockholm
- Line number: Line 30, Line 31
- Locale: Nacka, Solna, Stockholm, Sundbyberg
- Termini: Solna railway station; Sickla station
- Stations: 28
- Website: SL

Service
- Type: Tram/Light rail
- Operator: Stockholms Spårvägar
- Depot: Ulvsunda depot
- Ridership: 98,000 (2018)

History
- Opened: 1 August 2000; 26 years ago (Gullmarsplan–Liljeholmen) 6 January 2000 (Liljeholmen–Alvik); 14 August 2002 (Gullmarsplan–Sickla udde); 28 October 2013 (Alvik–Solna centrum); 18 August 2014 (Solna centrum–Solna railway station); 2 October 2017 (Sickla udde–Sickla station) 16 May 2021 (Norra Ulvsunda–Bromma flygplats)

Technical
- Line length: 20 km (12 mi)
- Num of tracks: 2
- Character: At-grade, elevated, in tunnels, street running
- Track gauge: 1,435 mm (4 ft 8 1/2 in) standard gauge
- Electrification: 750 V DC OHLE
Route map
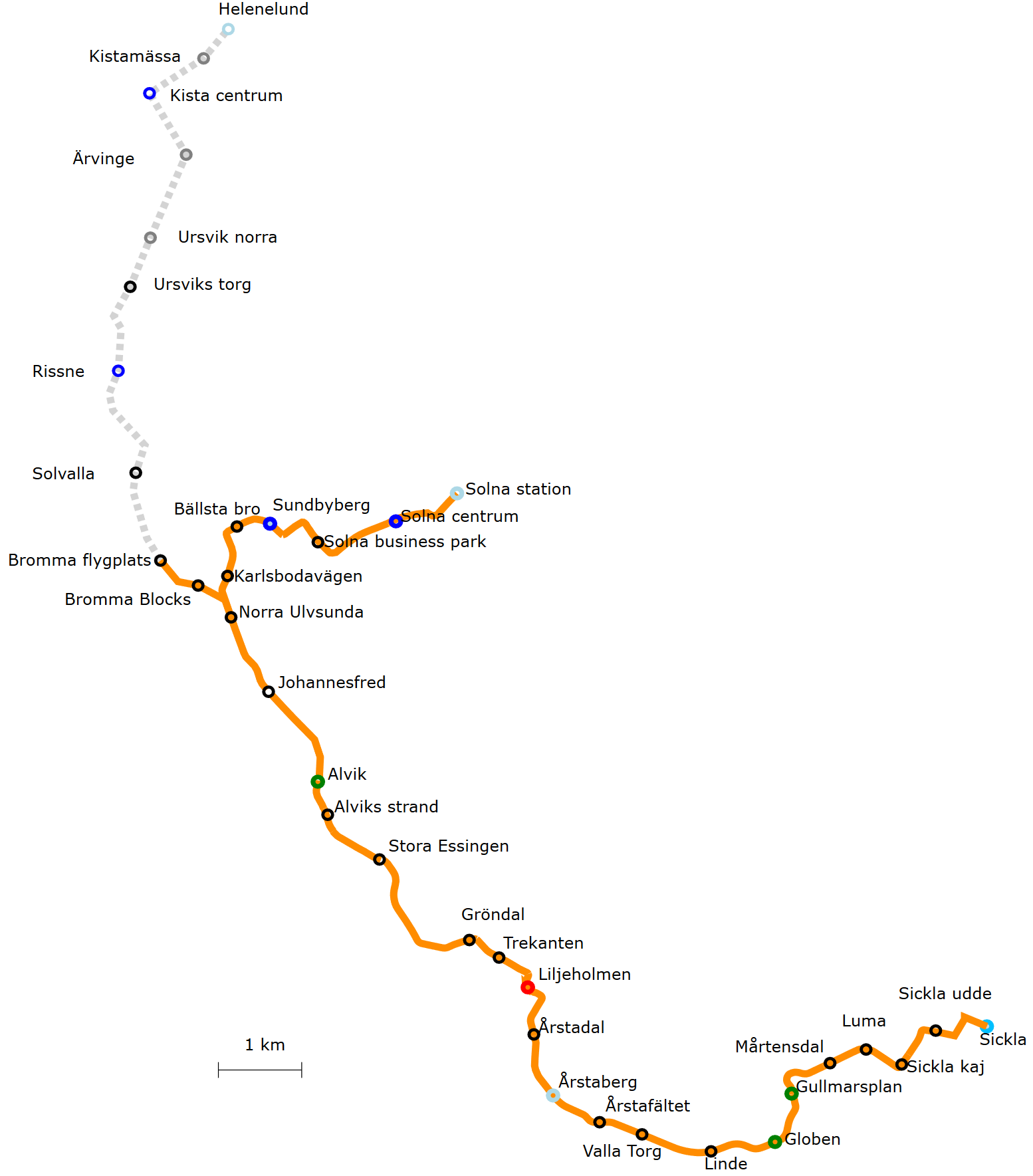

Tvärbanan (lit. 'the Transverse Line') is a light rail line in Stockholm, Sweden, which runs largely in a semicircle south, west and north around central Stockholm - crosswise to the otherwise radial metro and commuter rail lines of Stockholm. It links together several transit lines through its connections with the southern, western and northern metro branches of the Stockholm Metro (Tunnelbana) as well as three branches of the Stockholm commuter rail (Pendeltåg).

The ability to travel between southern, western and northern greater Stockholm without having to enter the city centre significantly reduces the number of transit passengers, also reducing the number of trains having to pass through Gamla Stan bottleneck during peak hours. The tramway is separated from roads in most parts, but there are sections in Gröndal, Sundbyberg and Solna where the tracks run on roads among regular road traffic. In Hammarby sjöstad the trams run in a reservation in the centre of the road rather than in mixed traffic, but there are several level crossings. Near Liljeholmen the track is shared with freight traffic for a short section, this being the only place in Sweden where freight traffic and trams share the same track.

Traffic on Tvärbanan started in 2000, first between Gullmarsplan and Liljeholmen, then later between Liljeholmen and Alvik, in 2002 between Gullmarsplan and Sickla Udde, and in 2013 between Alvik and Solna centrum. It has later been extended to Solna railway station (2014), Sickla (2017) and most recently, Bromma Airport (2021), the last of which being the first part of the new Kista branch. Tvärbanan was used by around 108,000 passengers per weekday in 2019.

The bridges used by Tvärbanan include Alviksbron, Gröndalsbron, Fredriksdalsbron and Ulvsundabron.

== History ==
During the latter part of the 1980s, interest in tramway transportation grew in the Stockholm area, with various proposals emerging from both public and private sectors. One notable group, dubbed the "Tvärspårvägsgruppen" (Cross-tramway Group), comprising Asea, Skanska, VBB, and the transport consultancy firm Transek, along with PKbanken and Skandinaviska Enskilda Banken, presented conceptual studies for tramway networks in Stockholm's northern and southern suburban regions. The proposed northern cross-tramway would run from Vällingby to Mörby via Hässelby, Barkarby, Akalla, and Häggvik, while the southern cross-tramway would connect Skärholmen and Skarpnäck via Huddinge and Farsta. Additionally, the "Hästskolinjen" (Horseshoe Line) was suggested in the Semi-central Belt, linking Hammarby Sjöstad to Ropsten, passing through Liljeholmen, Alvik, and Karolinska Hospital.

Stockholm County Council conducted a tramway investigation, prioritising the "Horseshoe Line" as the most economically viable route. However, during the planning phase, negotiations for the "Dennis package" an agreement for investments in rail and road infrastructure in Stockholm County, occurred simultaneously with regional infrastructure planning. The agreement reached in September 1992 only included the Horseshoe Line, now referred to as the "Snabbspårvägen" (Express Tramway). Consequently, it was incorporated into the regional plan of 1991, with land reserved in the Stockholm comprehensive plan for the line.

Construction of Tvärbanan (the Cross Tramway) began in 1996, with the segment between Gullmarsplan and Liljeholmen opening for traffic in January 2000, followed by an extension to Alvik later that year. This extension marked the first new North-South connection across lake Mälaren or the Baltic Sea in Stockholm in approximately 40 years. Another extension from Gullmarsplan to Sickla Udde in Hammarby Sjöstad opened in August 2002, facilitating efficient interchange with suburban trains from the south upon the opening of the Årstaberg station in January 2006.

The initial funding covered the Alvik-Gullmarsplan section, but financing for subsequent segments was anticipated to be resolved by 1996. However, no funding solution materialised, and the agreement dissolved in February 1997. Despite this setback, construction progressed, and in 2009, the expansion of Tvärbanan's Solna branch commenced. This new section from Alvik to Solna centrum opened in 2013, with the final stretch to Solna railway station completed in August 2014.

Critics highlighted the high costs and technical standards of the Alvik-Solna section, which exceeded initial estimates. Nevertheless, Tvärbanan's positive impact on commuting, especially in areas like Hammarby Sjöstad and Årstadal, led to increased frequency being required, improving from a 10-minute to a 7.5-minute service during peak hours.

From 2013 to 2017, Tvärbanan operated as two separate lines, both designated as Line 22, with interchange available at Alvik. However the original signalling system was replaced between Sickla Udde and Alvik in 2017, with entire line reopening in August 2017 for through-traffic at Alvik. The first section Kista branch, connecting Norra Ulvsunda to Bromma Airport, commenced operations in May 2021 as Line 31, with a further extension to Kista and Helenelund currently under construction.

== Lines ==
Tvärbanan has two lines (30 and 31). L30 with 26 stops, going from Sickla south of the Stockholm city centre through Gullmarsplan, Årsta, Liljeholmen, Gröndal, Stora Essingen, Alvik west of the city centre, and Sundbyberg to Solna. The part to Solna Centrum opened 28 October 2013, and the final part to Solna railway station opened 18 August 2014. The Strawberry Arena can be reached within 15 minutes' walk from there. A single-stop extension from Sickla udde to Sickla opened on 2 October 2017, allowing for transfers with the Saltsjöbanan.

L31 has only 6 stops, going from the station of Alviks strand, passing through Alvik allowing for transfers to the Green Line and Nockebybanan, until continuing to Bromma Flygplats. The line opened on 16 May 2021 and is planned to be extended further in the near future, with construction underway. The line runs on the same track as line 30 except for the branch to Bromma Airport itself. The nearby Bromma Blocks shopping centre is served with a new stop as well.

Via the Tranebergstunnel north of Alvik there is a track connection with the metro and Brommadepån, which is shared with the Nockebybanan, but is only used for setting up carriages for the Nockebybanan and is otherwise abandoned. A new carriage hall, Ulvsundadepån, located at the Johannesfred tram stop, has taken over and since 2015 is a workshop and depot for Tvärbanan and Nockebybanan.

Line	Stretch	Length	Stops
30	Solna railway station – Sickla	18.2 km (11.3 mi)	26
31	Bromma airport – Alviks strand	4.1 km (2.5 mi)	6

=== Main interchange options ===
Location	Connections		
Location	Metro	Commuter rail	Other
Solna		Stockholm commuter rail	
Solna centrum	Blue Line (Stockholm Metro)		
Sundbybergs centrum	Blue Line (Stockholm Metro)	Stockholm commuter rail	
Alvik	Green Line (Stockholm Metro)		(Nockebybanan)
Liljeholmen	Red Line (Stockholm Metro)		
Årstaberg		Stockholm commuter rail	
Globen	Green Line (Stockholm Metro)		
Gullmarsplan	Green Line (Stockholm Metro)		to Tyresö, Haninge, Årsta and Södermalm
Sickla			(Saltsjöbanan)

== Rolling stock ==
Tvärbanan is served by tram types designated A32 and A35. The A32, Flexity Swift from Bombardier, began operating on Tvärbanan in 1999. The A35, Urbos AXL from CAF was introduced in connection with the extension to Solna in October 2013. Both types are approximately 30 meters long and have 72–78 seats each, with two trams usually coupled to increase capacity, leading to a train of around 60 meters long. This compares to the 140 meter metro trains and the 214 meter commuter trains.

The trams are operated by a driver. Until June 2016, there was also a conductor on board for ticket validation. These are today replaced with ticket validators located at all stops.

Image	Model	Manufacturer	Type	Number of seats	Number of standing places	Train length [meters]	Empty weight [tonne]	Maximum power [MW]	Basket width [meters]	Maximum speed [km/h]	Introduced year
	A35	CAF	Urbos	72	203	30.8		0.48	0.265	90	2013
	A32	Bombardier	Flexity Swift	78	133	29.7	37.5	0.48	0.265	80	1999

== Signalling system ==
A signalling system monitors and controls the movements of rolling stock on a rail network to ensure safe operation. Tvärbanan previously suffered from a long-standing issue of incompatible and low performing rail signalling systems. The Tvärbanan network featured multiple different signalling systems from different vendors, because when the rail line was built, the signalling systems were tendered separately for each construction stage. A visible example of this was at the Alvik station, which was a break point between two systems. Even though the line runs straight at Alvik, the same train could not be run past the station because of the incompatibility of the systems. Passengers had to switch trains there. The section south of Alvik was closed during the summer of 2017 to upgrade the signalling.

== Extension ==
Construction on a branch line to Kista and Helenelund started in February 2018. The new branch was scheduled to open its first part to Bromma Airport in December 2020, however this was postponed, as approval from Swedavia was needed in order for the trams to be able to run past the airport. In cold weather, sparks arise from the trams' overhead contact line, which could disrupt radio signals in the air traffic control tower at Bromma Airport. Tests needed to be carried out in sub-zero temperatures to gain approval for traffic.

The first part of the new branch opened on 17 May 2021, with trams running on Line 31 between Alviks strand and Bromma flygplats.

=== New Stops ===
==== Bromma Blocks ====
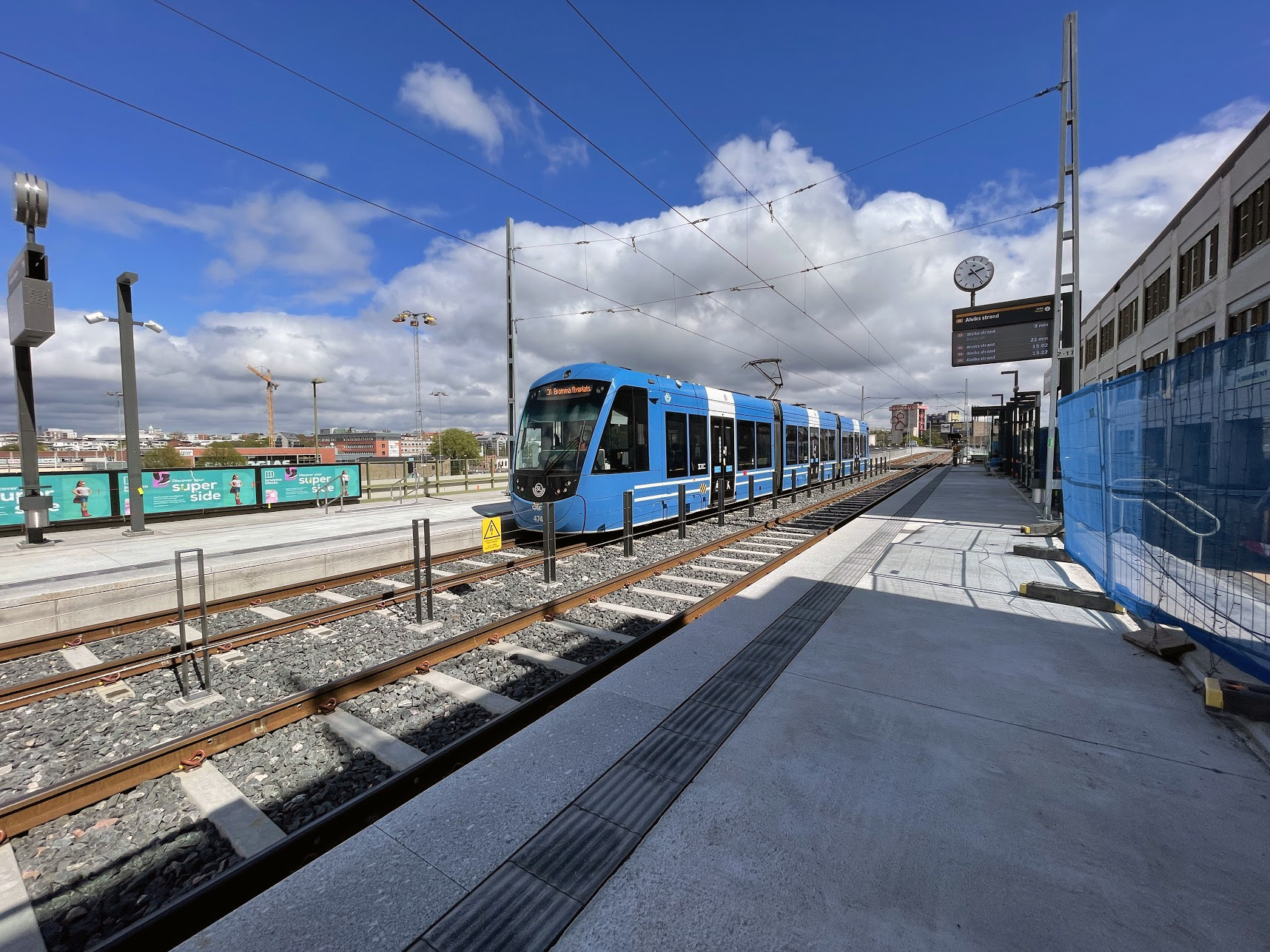

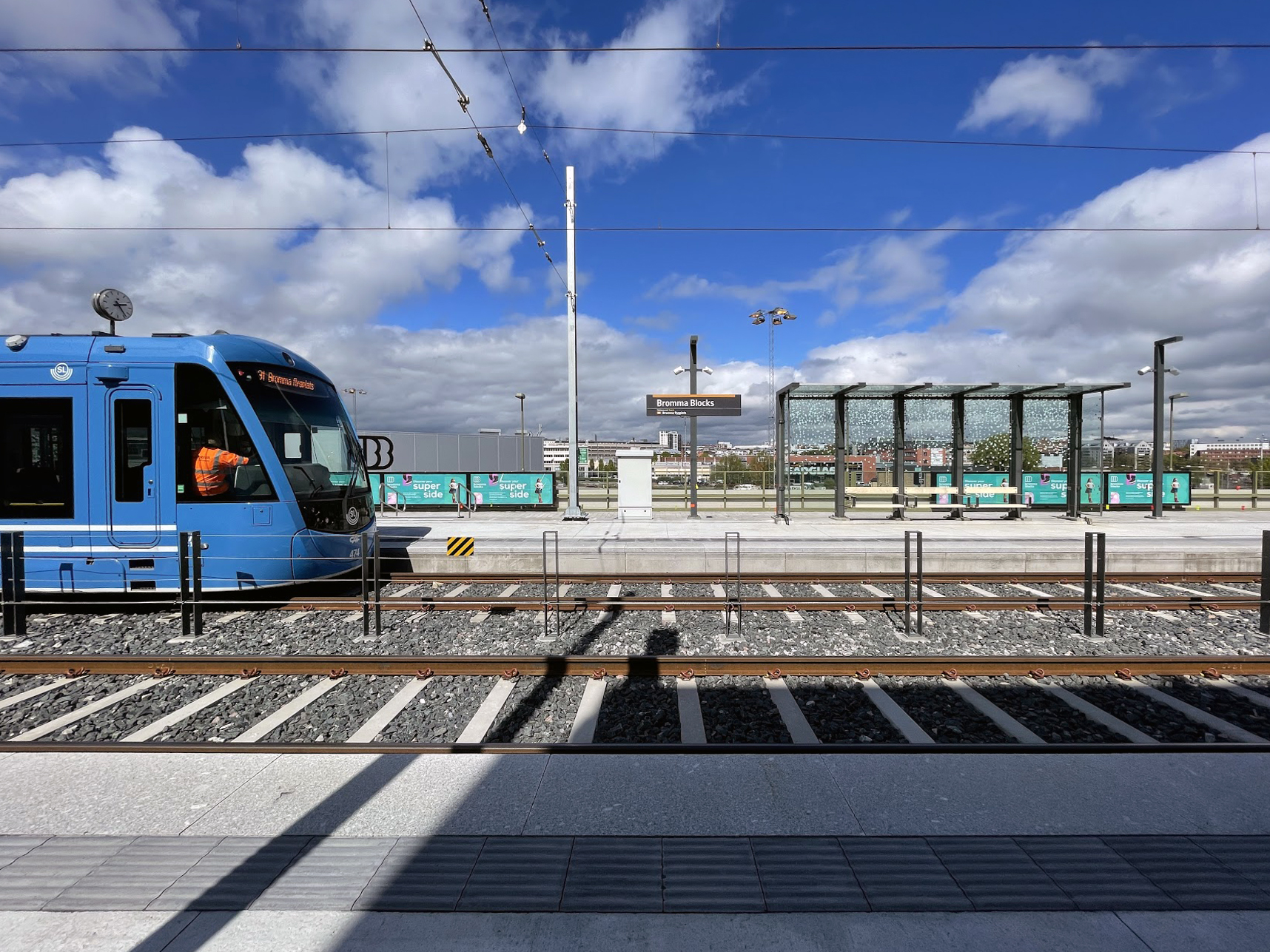

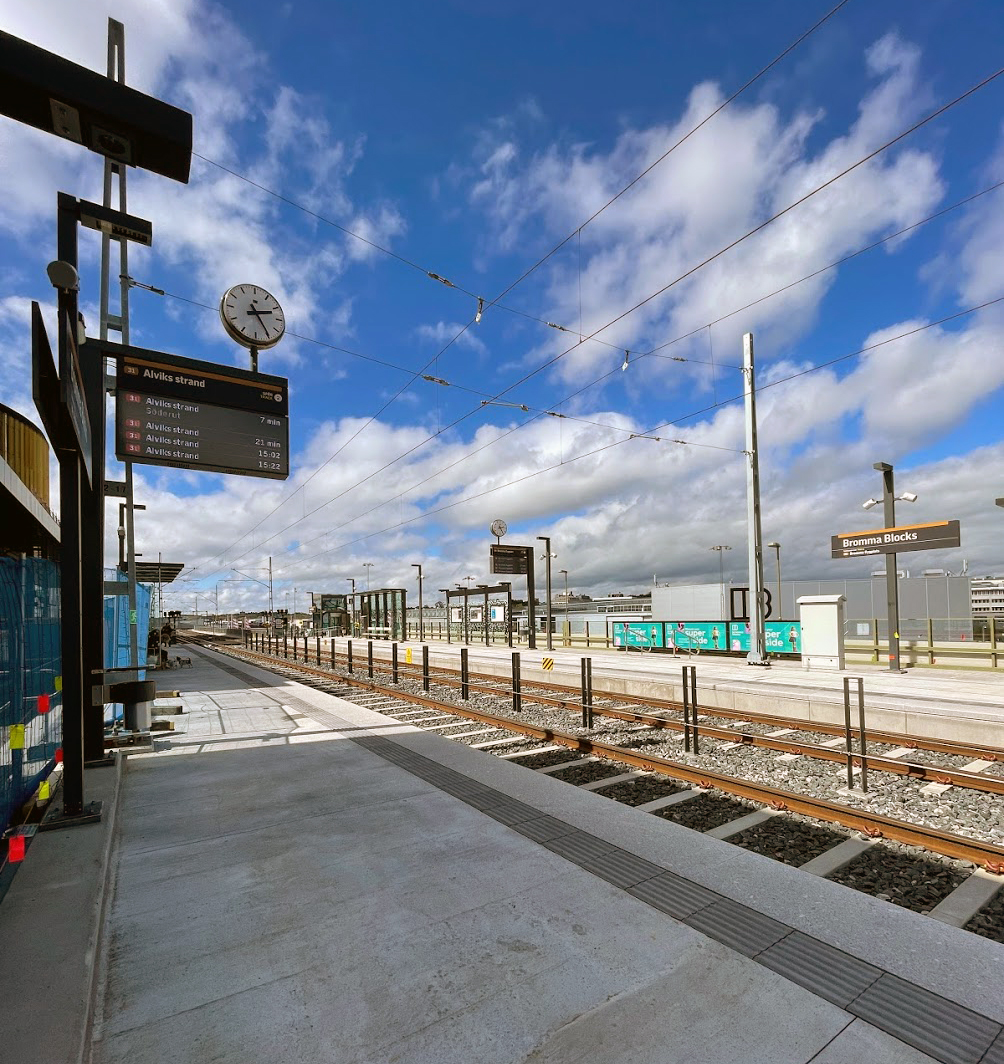

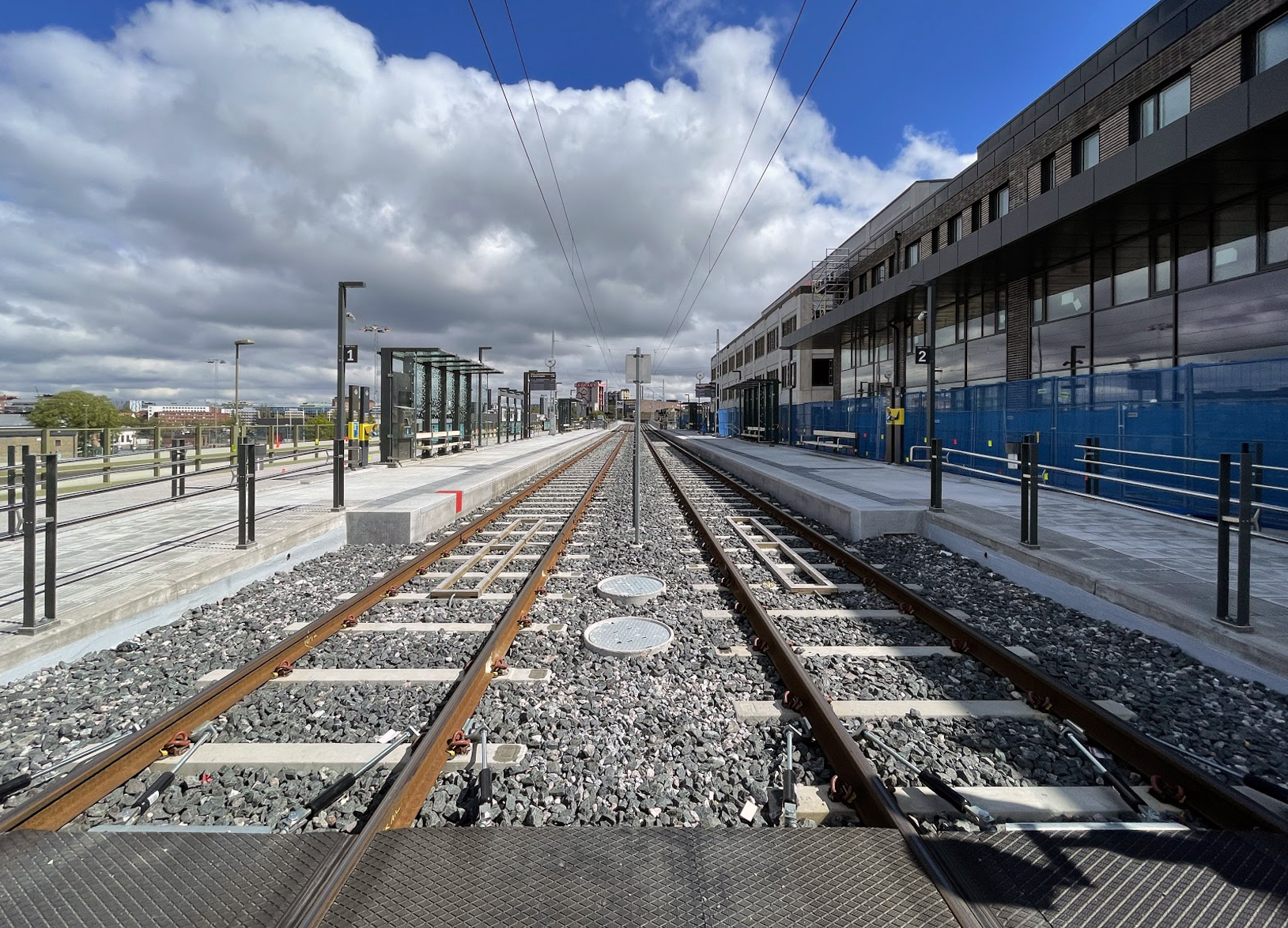

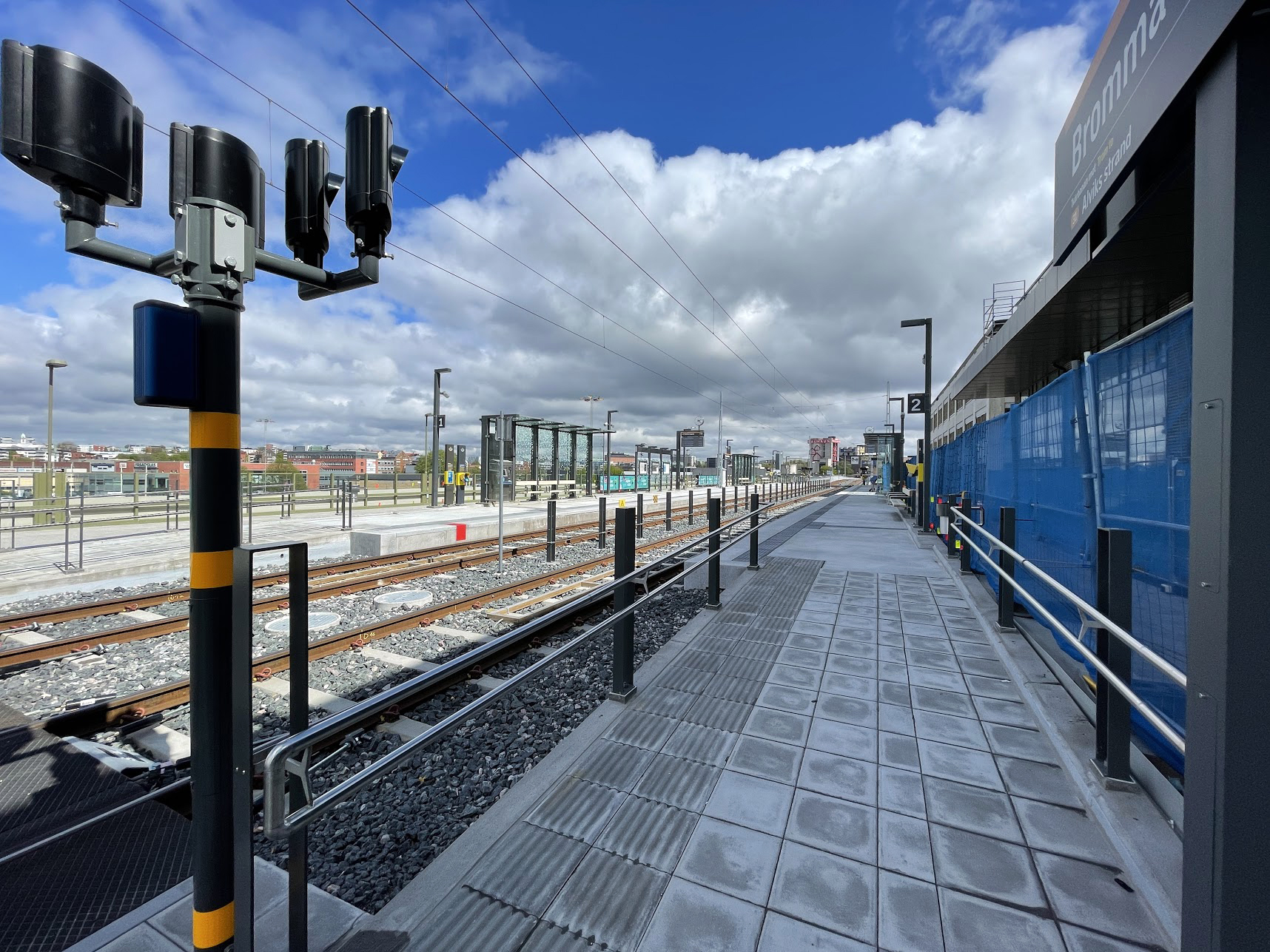

==== Bromma flygplats ====
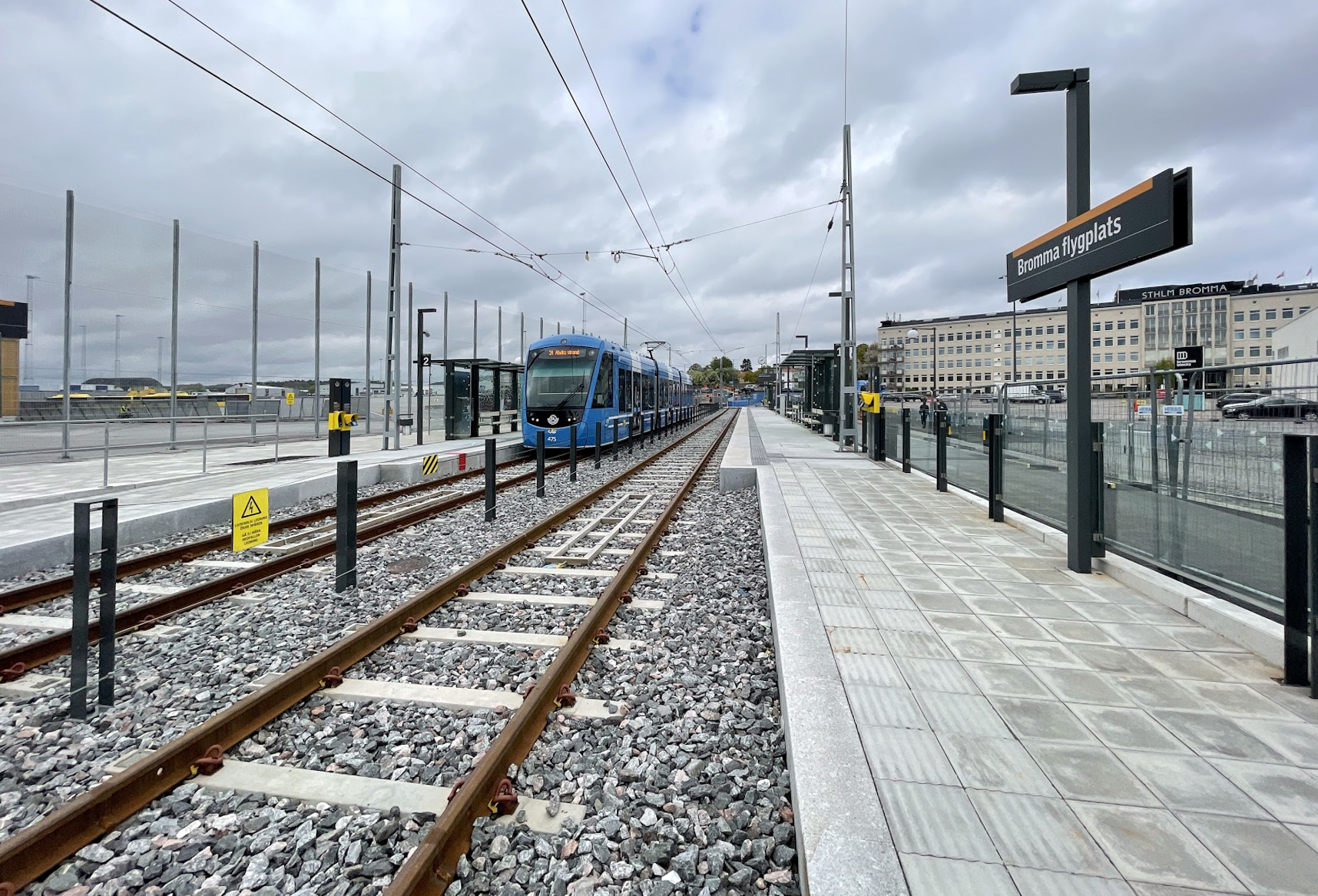

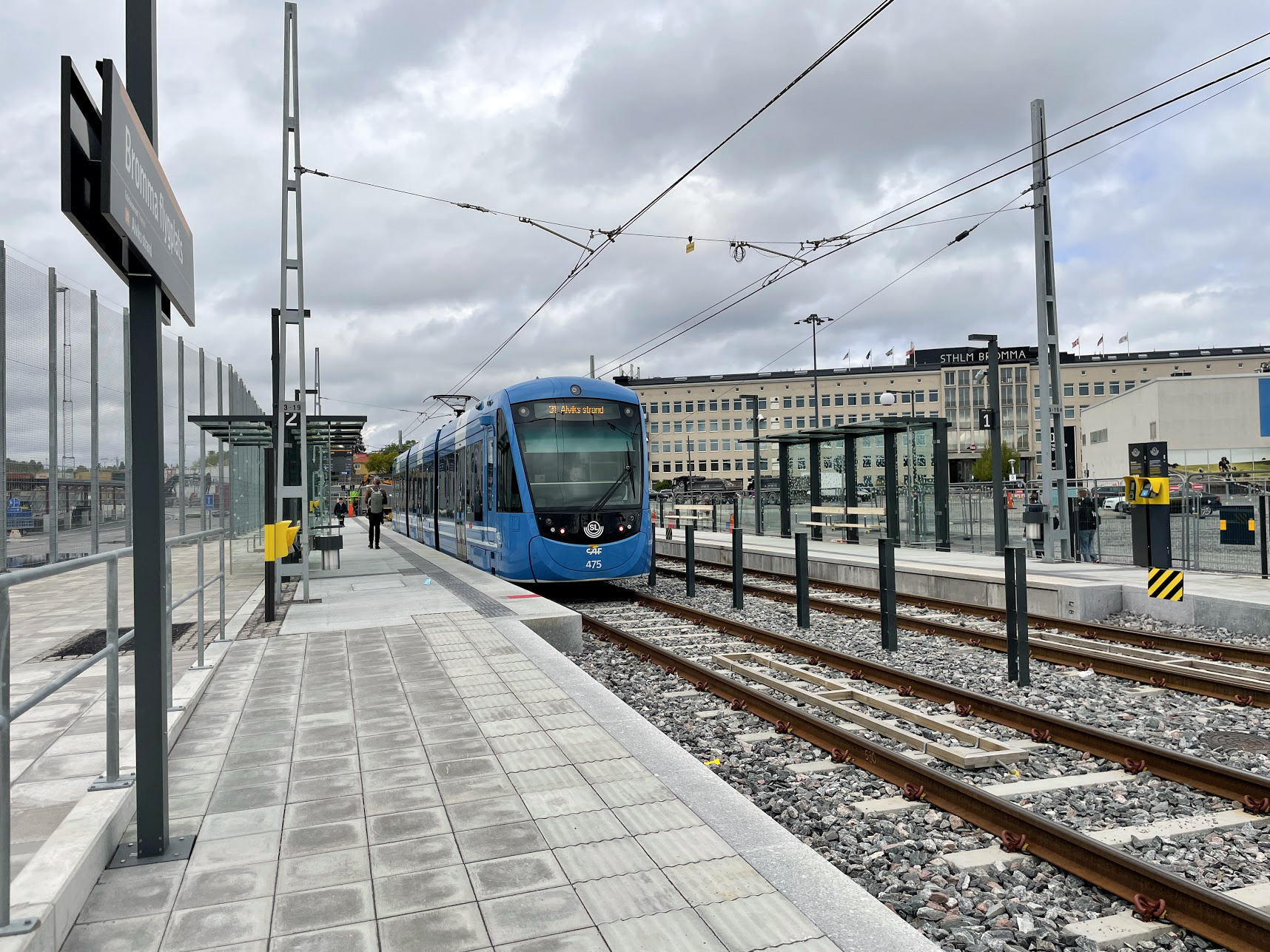

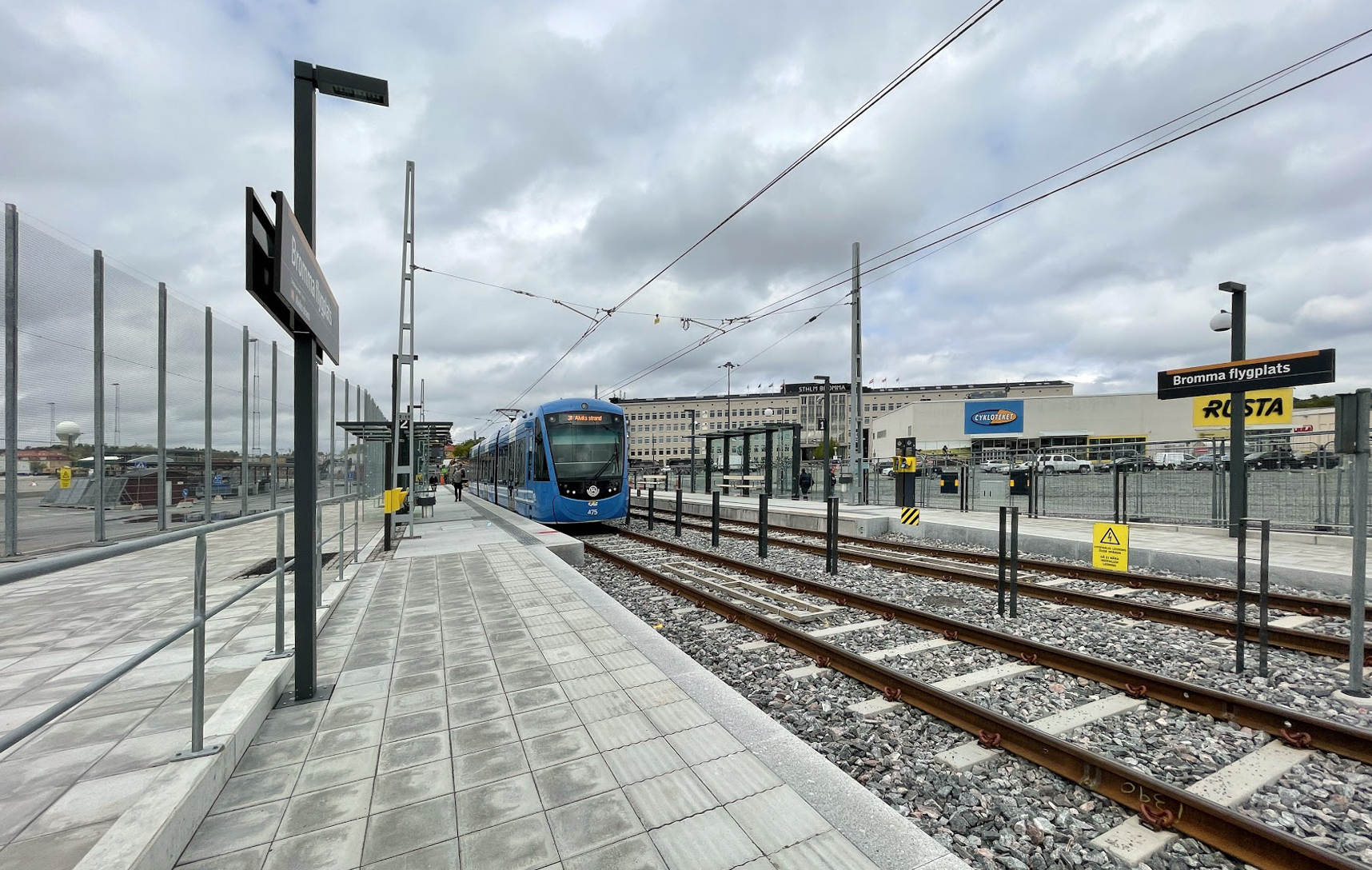

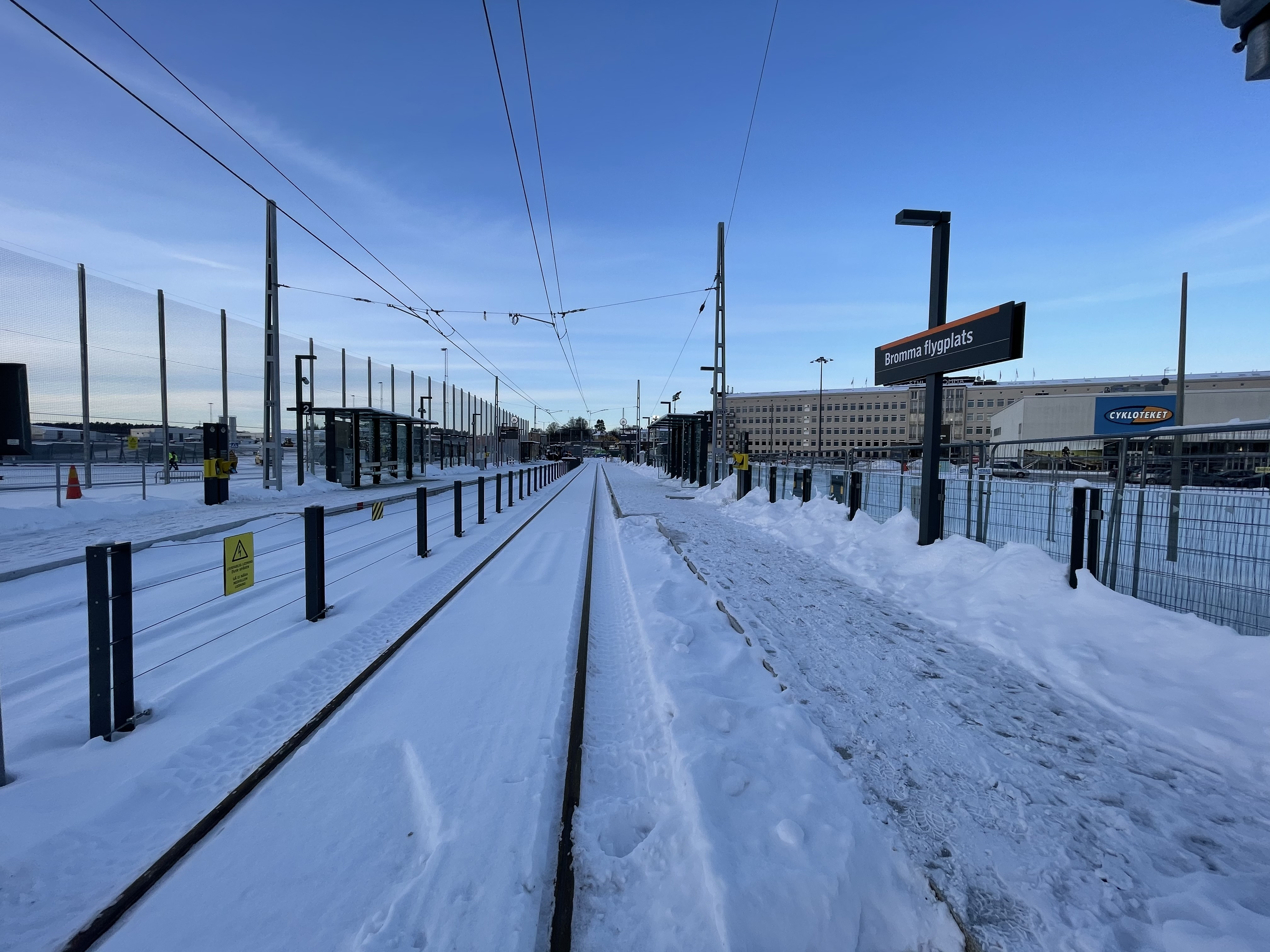

== Gallery ==
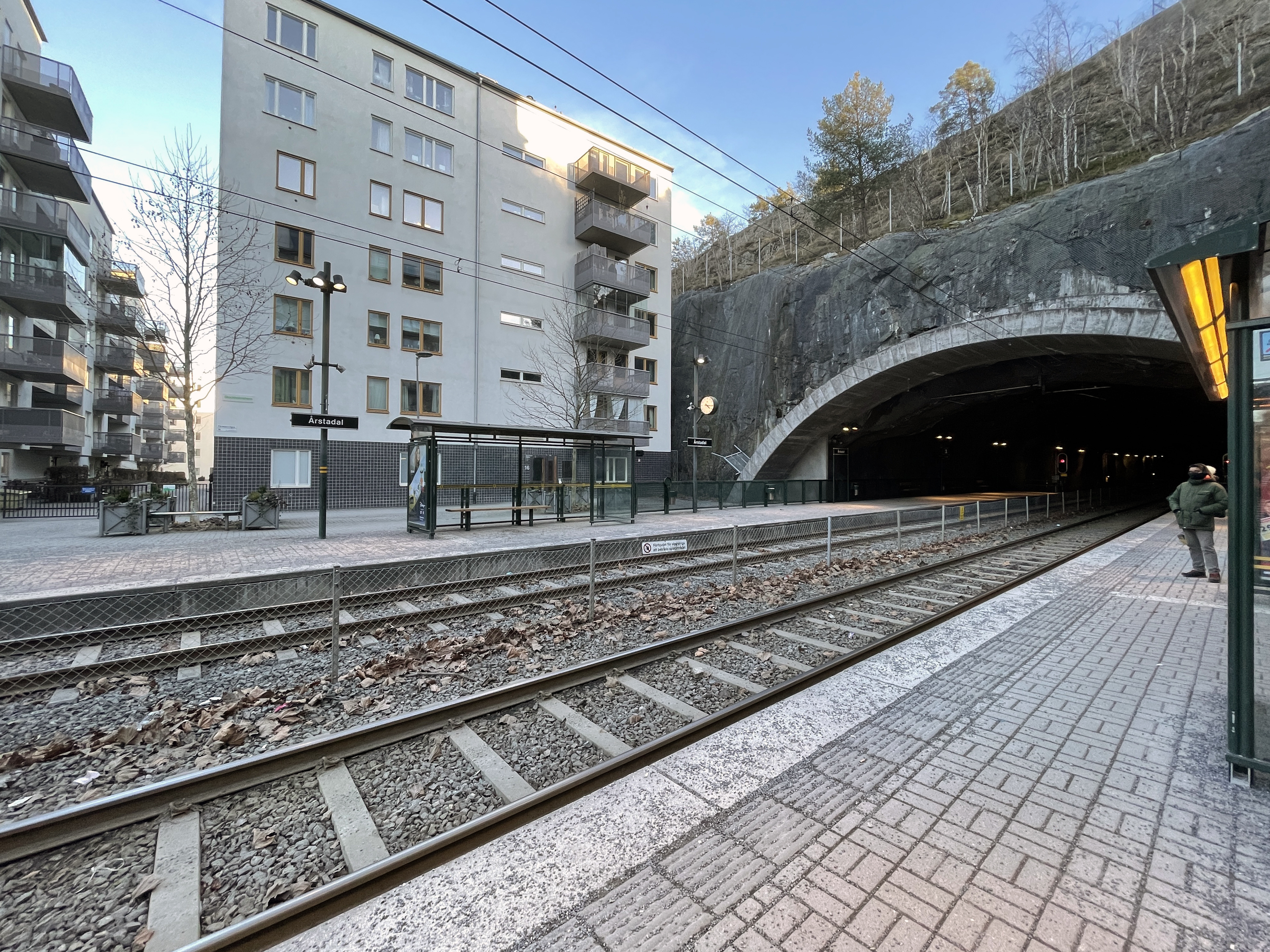
Årstadal

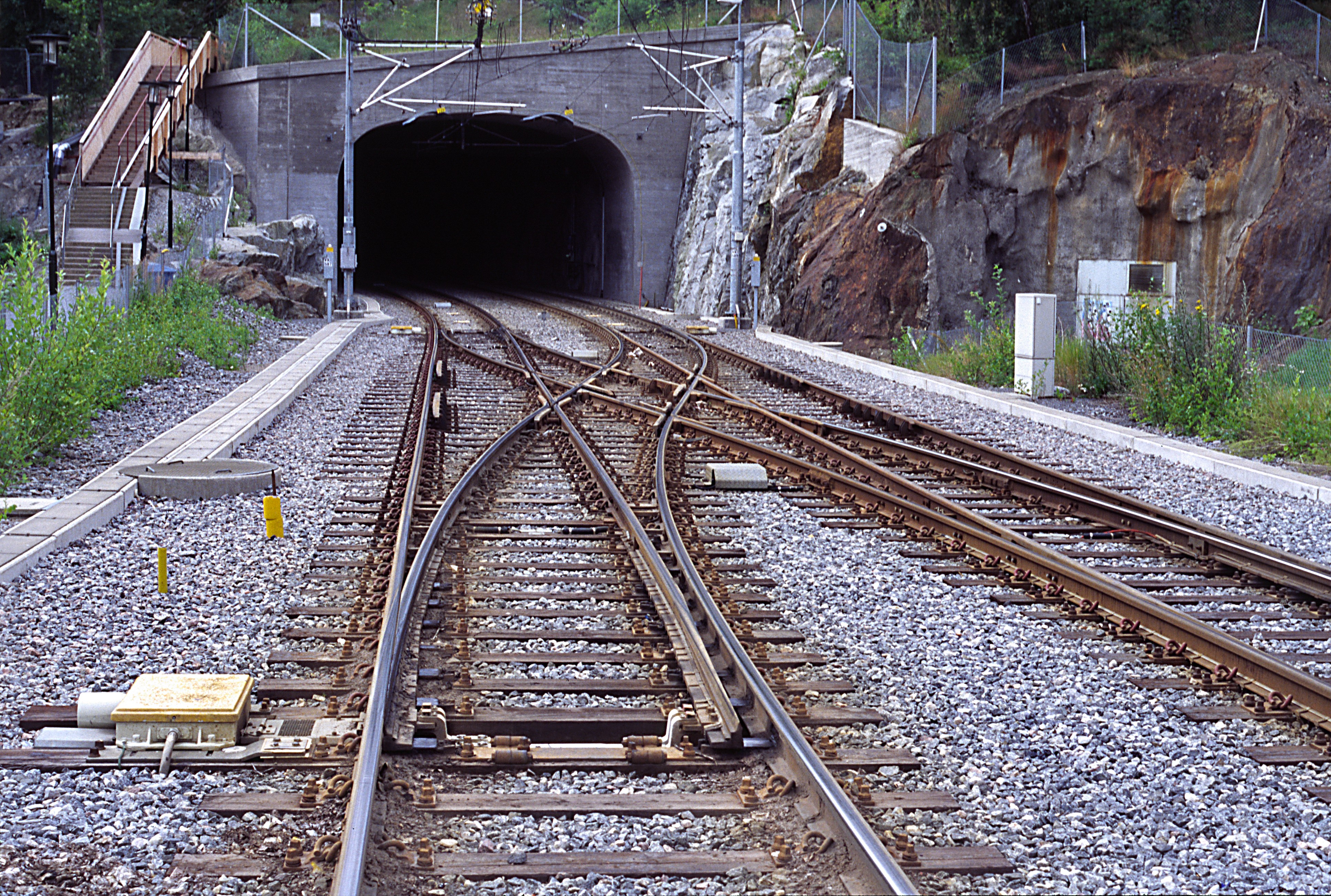
Tunnel Near Alvik

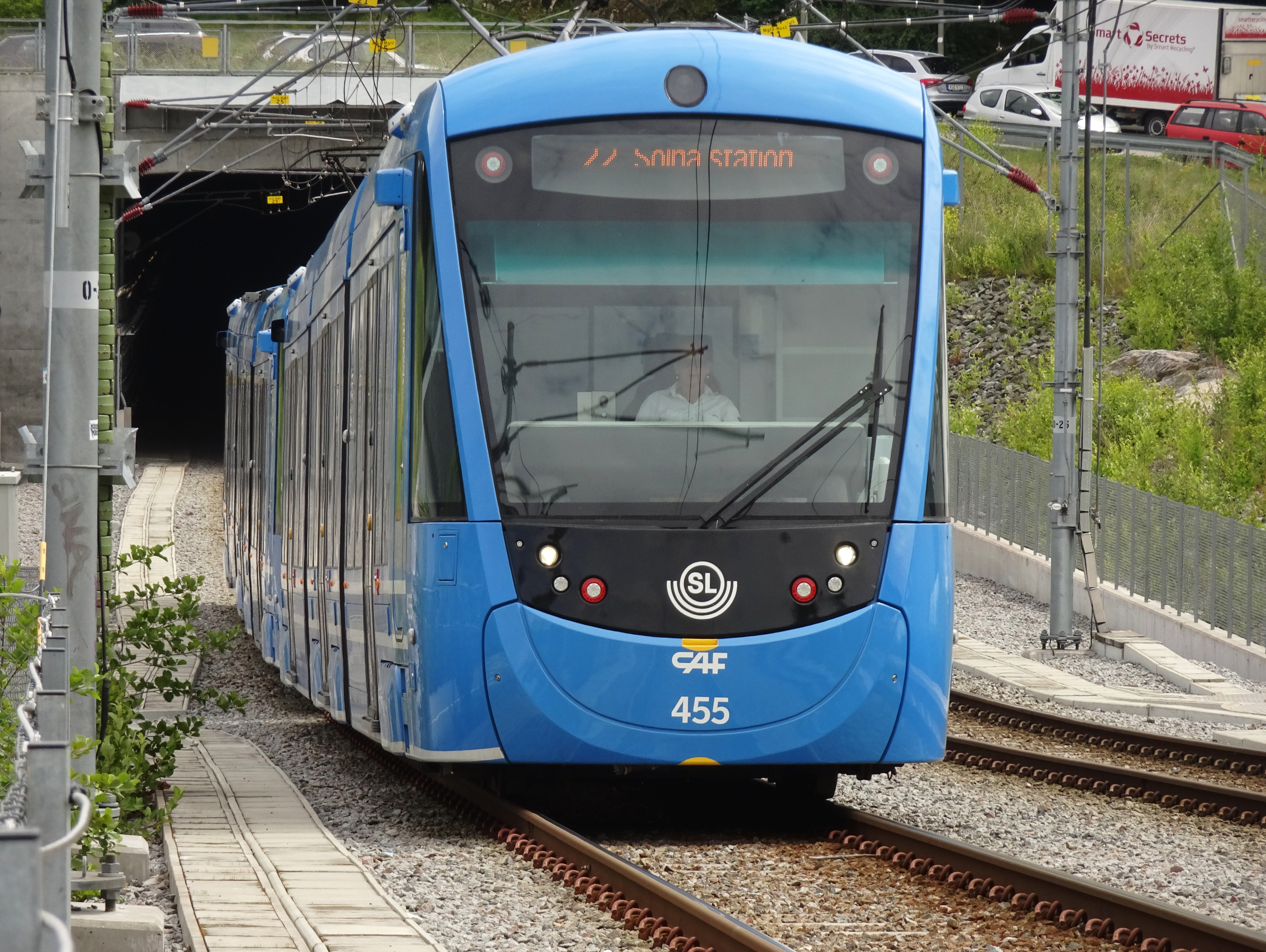
Tram Near Traneberg Tunnel

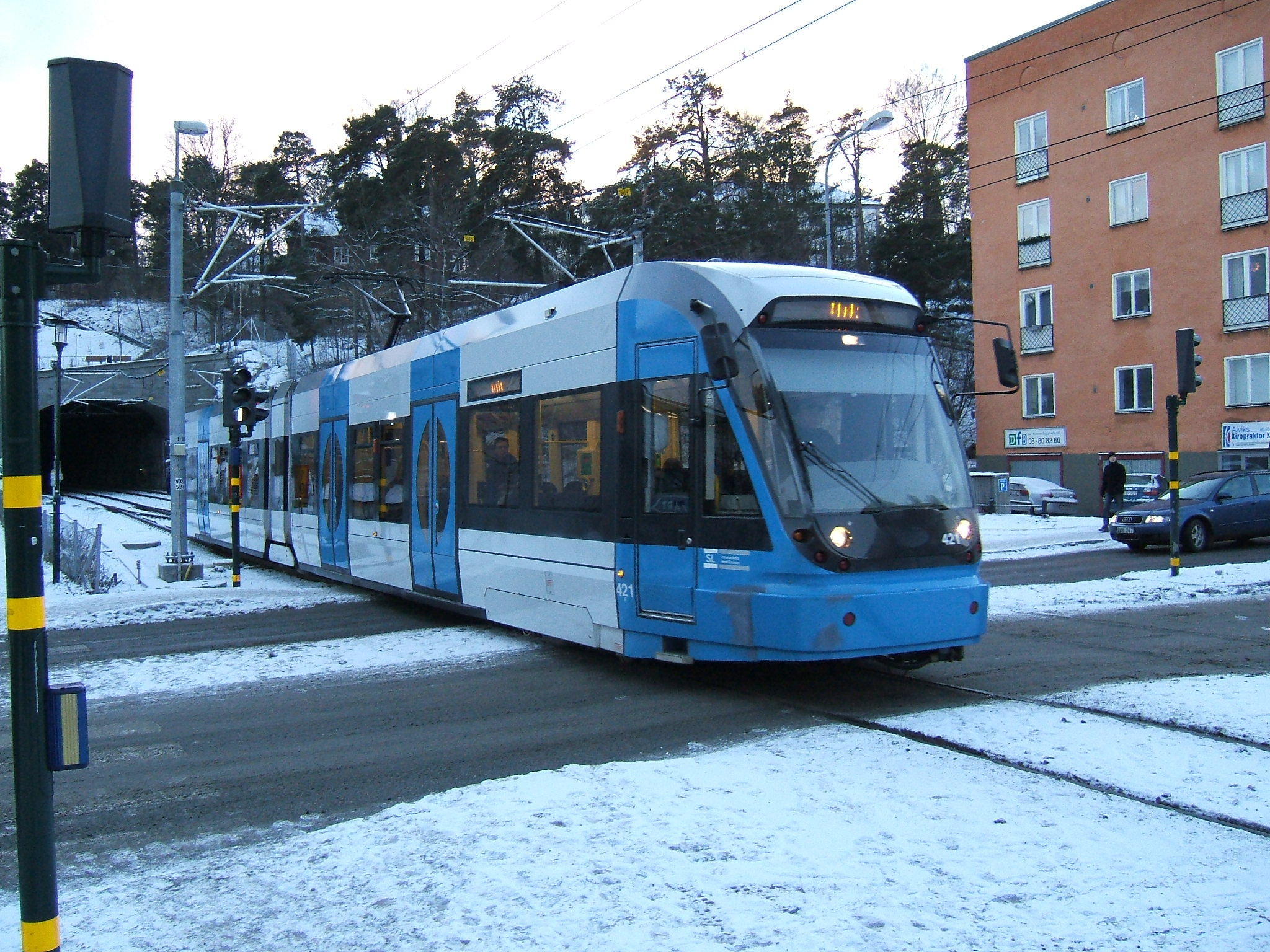
Tram Arriving at Alvik

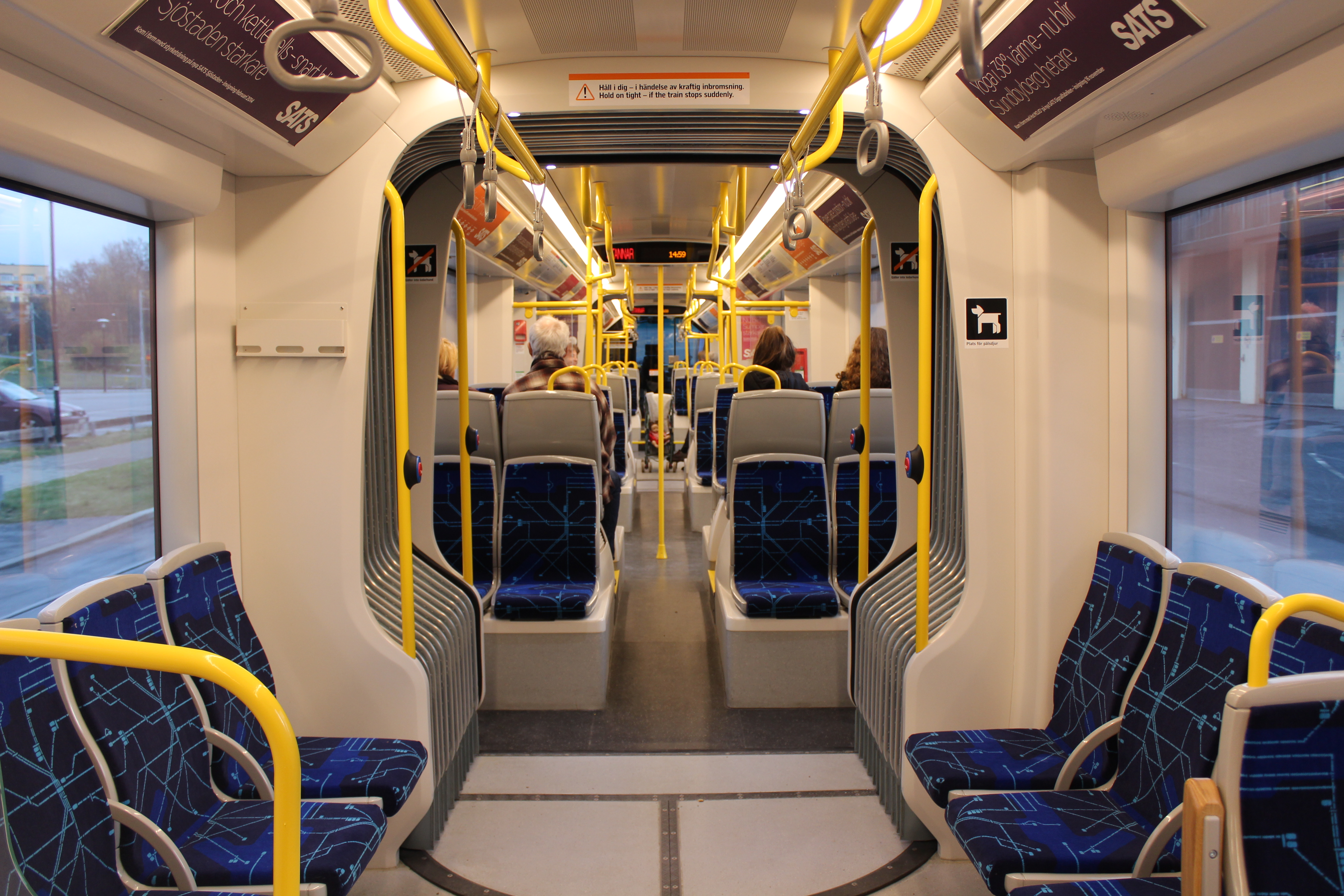
CAF A35 Interior

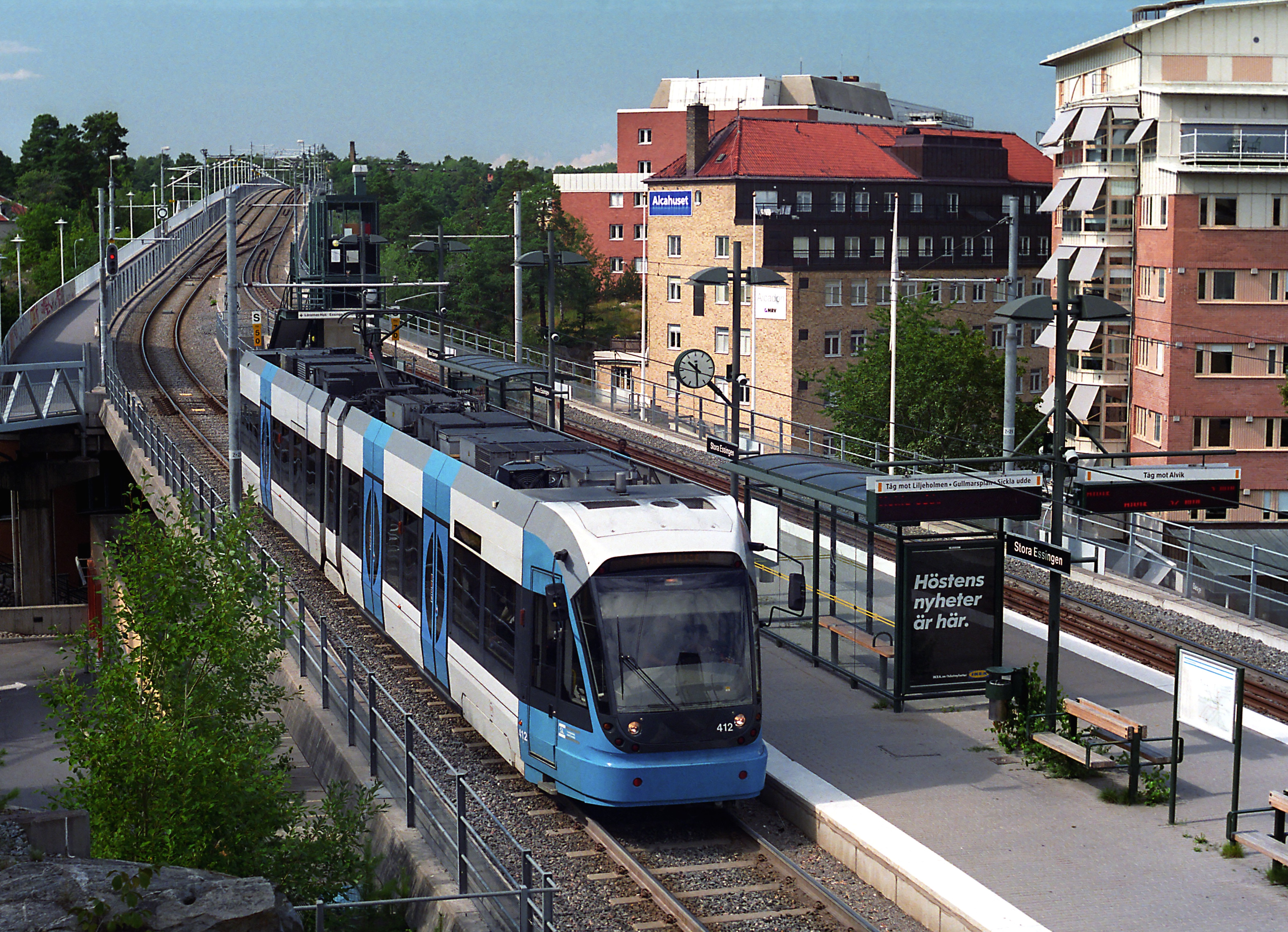
Stora Essingen

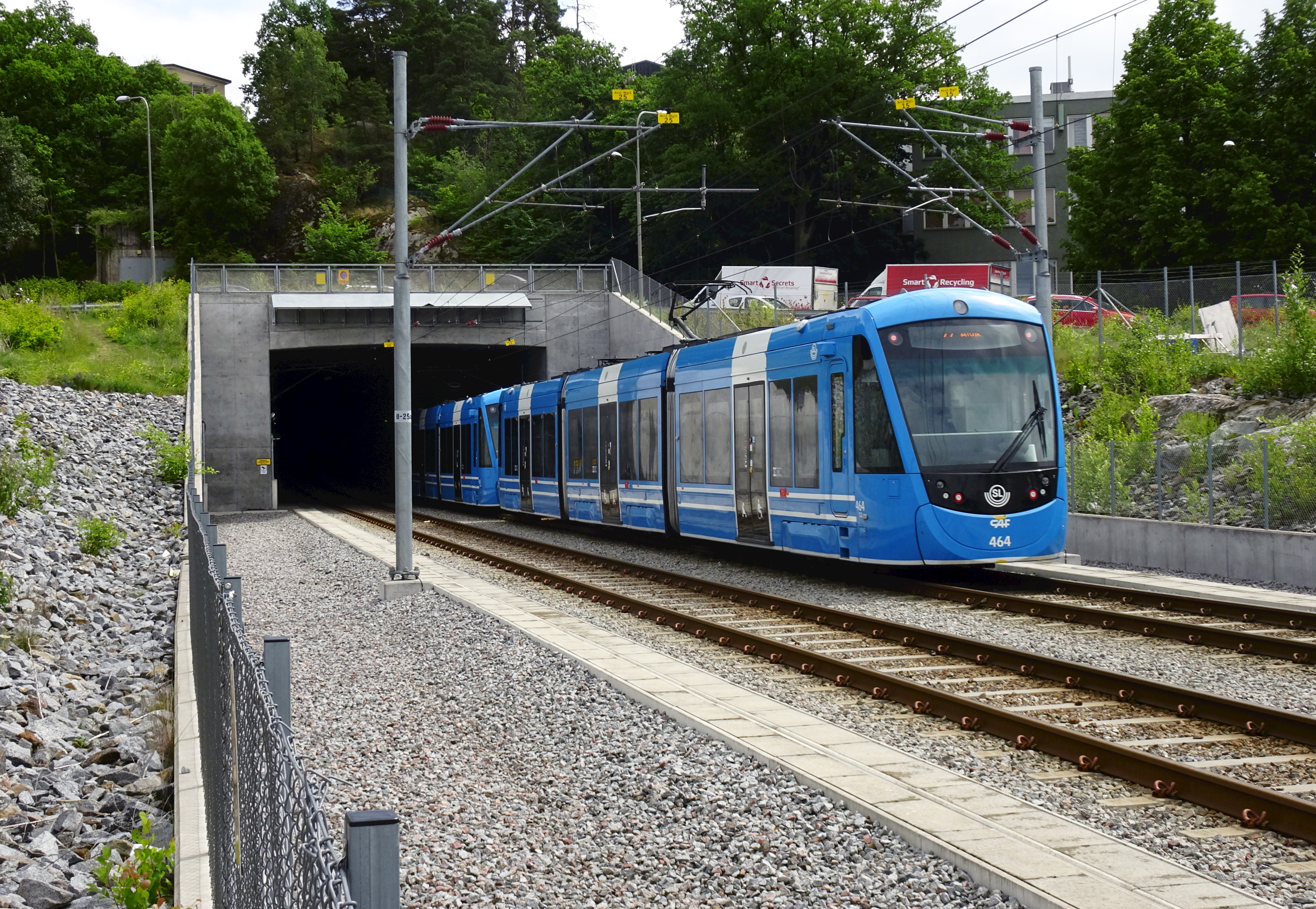
Tram Near Traneberg Tunnel

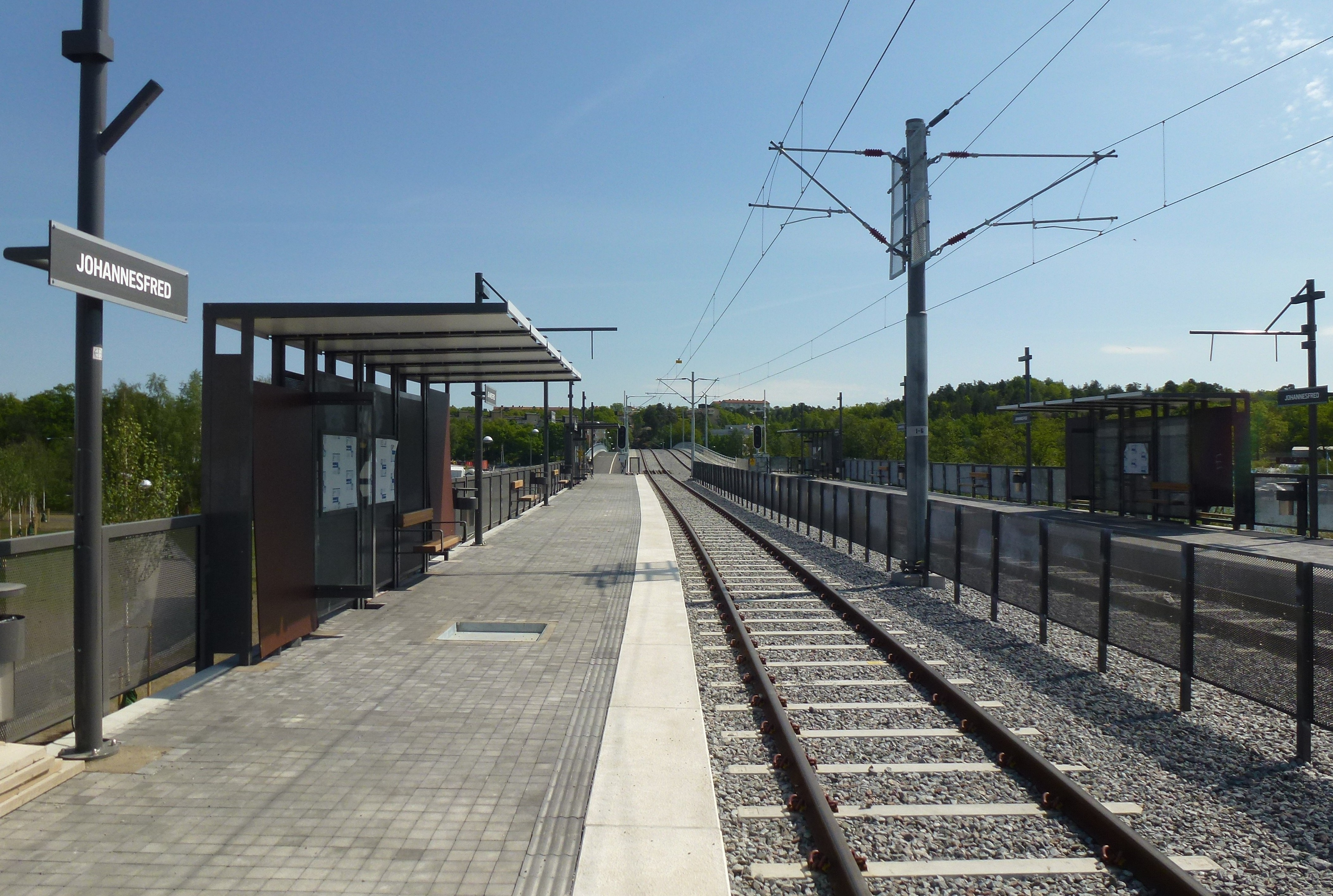
Johannesfred

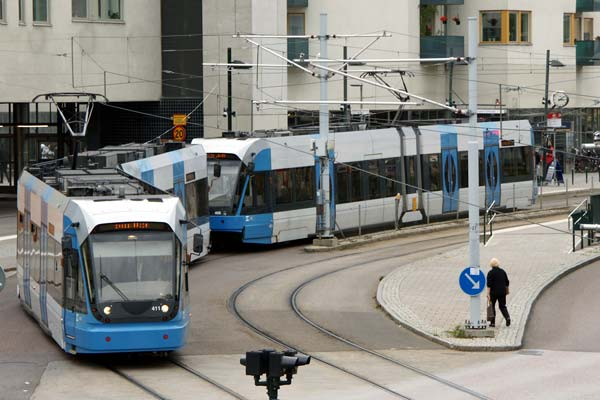
Tram Near Liljeholmen

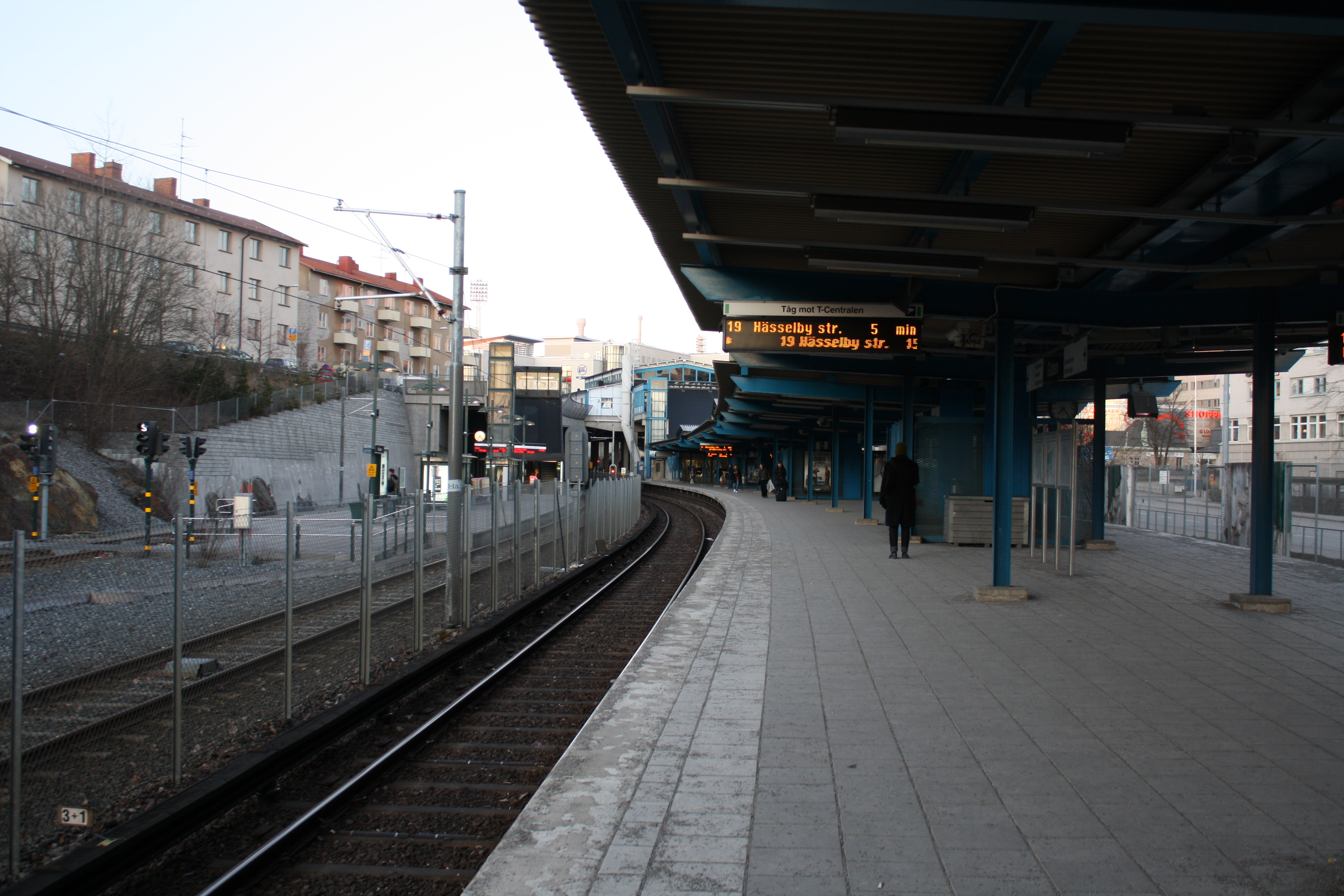
Globen

== See also ==
- List of tram and light-rail transit systems
- Public transport in Stockholm
- Trams in Stockholm
