= Liljeholmen railway station =

Railway station in Stockholm, Sweden

Coordinates: 59°18′38″N 18°01′44″E

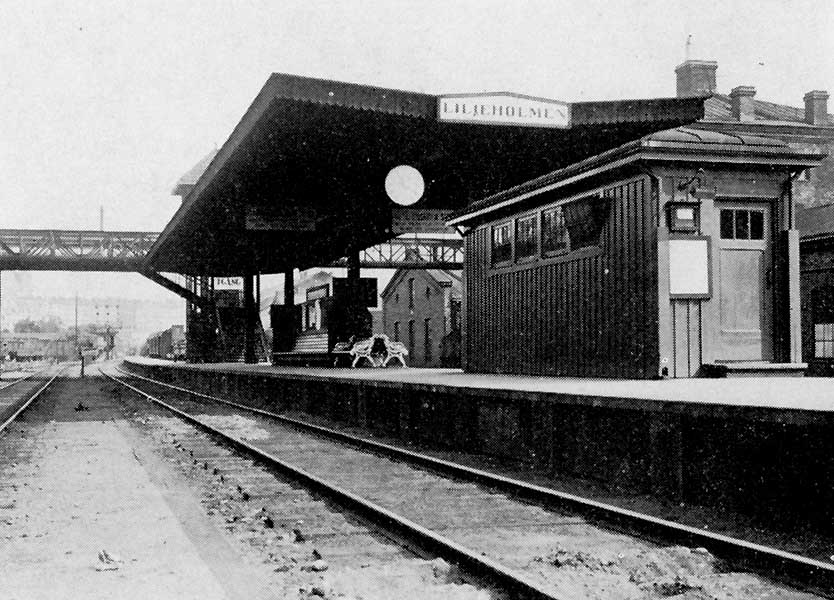
Liljeholmen station around 1910

Liljeholmen was a railway station on a now by-passed routing of the Western Main Line in Liljeholmen, Stockholm, Sweden. The station opened in 1860, closed to passengers in 1929, and to freight in 1998.

The station opened on 1 December 1860 and was situated on the original routing of the main line, which crossed the Liljeholmsviken by a low level causeway and swing bridge just to the north of the station. In 1929, the main line was diverted to use the Årsta Bridge, at a higher level and to the east of the previous bridge. This resulted in the station being closed to passengers, but it remained open as a freight station until 1998. The only vestige of railway use that still remains is an industrial track through the old station area to an industrial facility on Liljeholmsviken.
