= Trehörningen =

Trehörningen is Swedish for "The Triangle", or literally "The Three-Corner", and can refer to many different geographical locations, including:

- Trehörningen (Sjödalen) - a lake in Huddinge Municipality, in the Sjödalen-Fullersta area.
- Trehörningen, Hanveden - a lake in Huddinge Municipality, in the Hanveden area.
- Trehörningen, Tyresta - a lake in Tyresö Municipality, in Tyresta National Park

== See also ==
- Trekanten (disambiguation) ("The Three-Edge")
