= Trekanten (Stockholm) =

Lake in Stockholm, Sweden

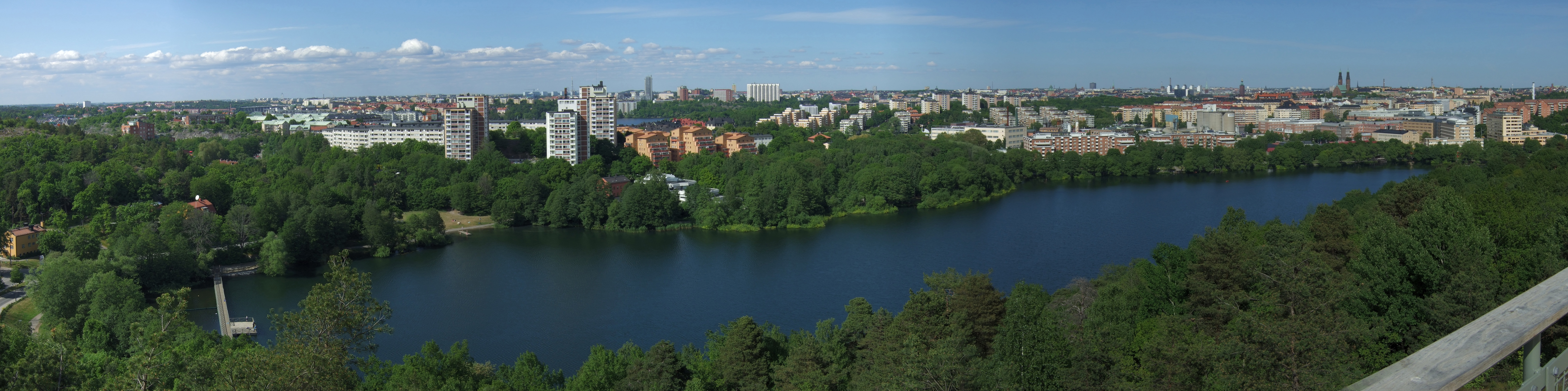
- View from Nybohov

- Location within Stockholm
- Coordinates: 59°18′42″N 18°0′56″E
- Primary outflows: Liljeholmsviken, Lake Mälaren
- Catchment area: 60 ha (150 acres)
- Basin countries: Sweden
- Surface area: 13.5 ha (33 acres)
- Average depth: 4.3 m (14 ft)
- Max. depth: 7.0 m (23.0 ft)
- Water volume: 570,000 m^{3} (460 acre⋅ft)
- Residence time: 3 years
- Shore length^{1}: 1,690 m (5,540 ft)
- Surface elevation: 0.67 m (2 ft 2 in)
- Settlements: Gröndal, Liljeholmen
- ^{1} Shore length is not a well-defined measure.

Trekanten (English: The Triangle) is a small lake in southern-central Stockholm, Sweden.

Trekanten is located in a park furnished with an artificial bathing beach and various planted-out fish species. It has a small drainage area with no major feeders. In the early 1980s, potable water was poured into the lake while water from the bottom of the lake was pumped out. These operations resulted in a significant reduction in levels of phosphorus but failed to affect levels of nutrients and oxygen depletion in the bottom layers. Levels of lead and copper are among the highest documented in any lake in Stockholm. Whilst the lake flora and fauna is roughly representative for Stockholm, the lake forms a natural link between the bays Årstaviken and Vinterviken.

== Catchment area ==
Along the shores of the lake is a park created on a flat terrain. Leading up to Nybohov on the southern side of the lake is a fault bluff with pines and deciduous trees, including hazel. On the eastern shore is a bathe next to the Liljeholmen metro station, a bus terminal, the light rail Tvärbanan, newly added flats, and some older buildings. Several residential areas surround the lake, including Gröndal.

About 30% of the catchment area is settled land and two major traffic routes passes through the area.

=== Environmental influence ===
In an old industrial area north of the lake is a timber trade, the only remaining polluting operation in the catchment area. About 60 kg of phosphorus is brought to the lake annually, of which more than half is released from lake sediments and the rest is derived from surface runoff, which also contributes some 260 kg of nitrogen. Historically, the lake was flanked by small scale industries such as tanneries, dye, and creosote works and until the early 1960s sewage and overflow water was guided into the lake. During the past 20 years, however, airing of bottom layers coupled with addition of potable water have improved the state of the lake. While the affected terrain has been restored since the operations were discontinued, in 1997 low levels of arsenic and increased levels of DDT were documented.

Though stormwater from parts of the traffic route Essingeleden has been redirected elsewhere, water from a 300 metres long viaduct is still brought into the lake via a water treatment plant lessening oil levels with some 10 per cent and heavy metals with 9-14 per cent. Water from 200 metres of the Liljeholmsvägen traffic route (45,000 vehicles/day) is still led untreated into the lake. Thus, while surrounding blocks of flats are believed to contribute with most of the phosphorus and nitrogen, an estimated fourth of the zinc brought to the lake is believed to come from car tyres and about 18 per cent from settlements, while copper roofs, formerly abundant around the lake but mostly replaced by asphalt today, are thought to cause most of the copper.

== Flora and fauna ==
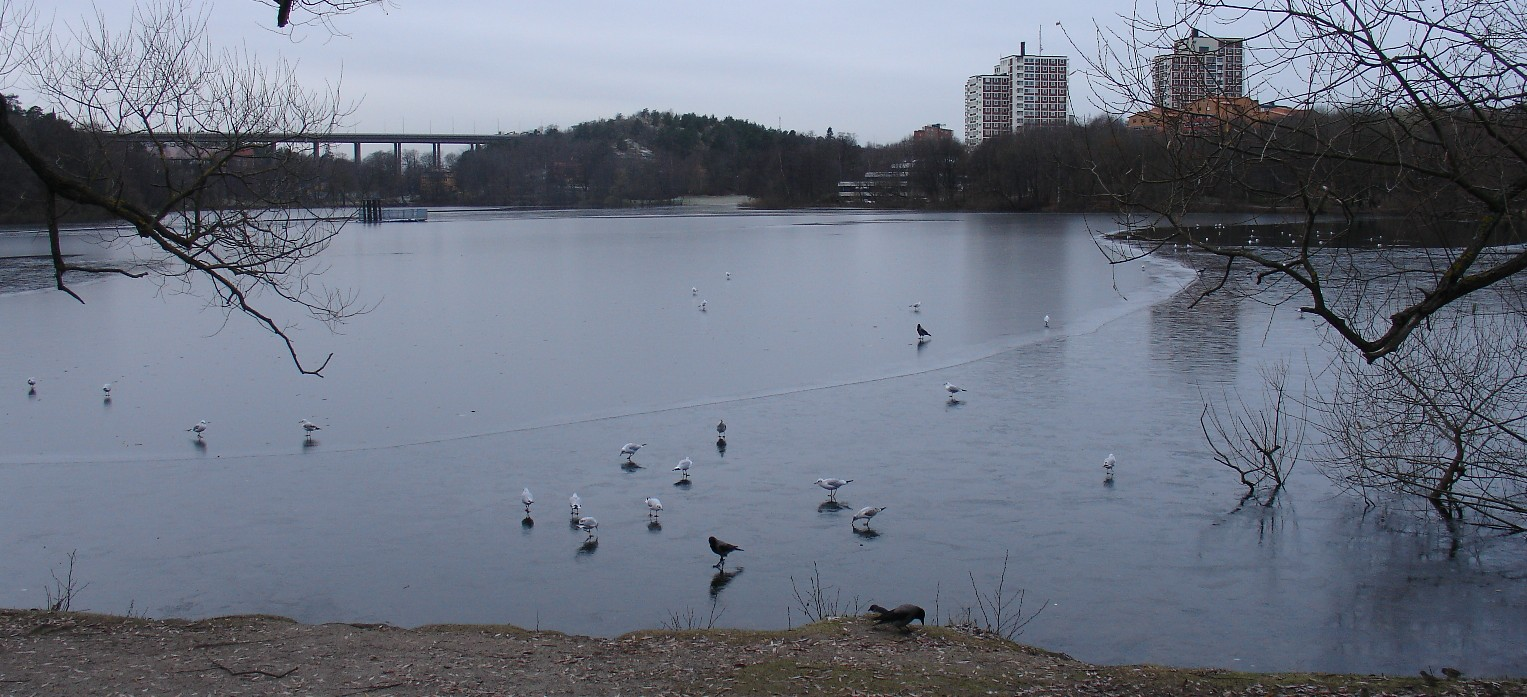
Lake Trekanten viewed from Liljeholmen.

In late summer, phytoplankton stock is dominated by green algae paired equal levels of diatoms, cyanobacteria, and a species of eutroph carapace flagellate (Ceratium hirundinella). Several of the blue green algae present in the lake are potentially poisonous and, notwithstanding non-alarming levels, therefore carefully monitored near the bathe. Lacking soft and shallow bottom areas near the shore, the lake contains only commonplace vegetation, save for the population of crack willow and the hybrid between white willow and bay willow found on the southern shore. Aquatic plants are dominated by white waterlily, amphibious bistort, and occasional curled pondweed (uncommon to Stockholm).

An inventory of lake bed fauna in 1997 produced a list of only 29 species/taxa including most common species, mostly freshwater gastropods, fireflies, and leeches but no beetles. A rotenone treatment in 1986 didn't affect the populations of crucian carp and signal crayfish still dominating the fauna. Perch was introduced shortly after the treatment, and northern pike and roach is believed to have found their way into the lake by themselves. Crucian carps are decimated by trawling annually and the population of roach has increased considerably since 2001. Carp, rainbow trout, and signal crayfish have been planted-out.

In early summer the lake is home to a number of birds including thrush nightingale, common chaffinch, garden warbler, and blackcap. Other birds common to Stockholm, such as mallard, Eurasian coot, tufted duck, and great crested grebe, are found by the lake, while heron visit the lake and common merganser fish here during winters. No amphibians have been documented by the lake.

== See also ==
- Geography of Stockholm
- Lakes of Sweden
