= Långsjön =

Långsjön ("long lake") may refer to the following lakes in Sweden:

- Långsjön, Älvsjö, on the border between Stockholm and Huddinge Municipalities
- Långsjön, Hanveden, on the border between Huddinge and Haninge Municipalities
- Långsjön (Skälsätra-Tutviken), on the border between Haninge and Tyresö Municipalities
- Långsjön, Tyresta, in Tyresö Municipality

== See also ==
- Langsjøen, a lake in Norway
