= Trekanten =

Trekanten (Danish, Swedish, and Norwegian: "the triangle") may refer to:

== Places ==
- Triangle Region (Denmark), a cooperation consisting of seven Danish municipalities on the Danish peninsula of Jutland and the island of Funen
- Trekanten (Helsinki), a small park in Kaartinkaupunki, Helsinki in Finland
- Trekanten (Stockholm), a small lake in southern-central Stockholm in Sweden
- Trekanten, Sweden, a village in Kalmar Municipality in Sweden
- Trekanten (Kristiansand), a neighborhood in the city of Kristiansand, Norway
- Trekanten (shopping center), a shopping centre in Asker municipality in Norway

== See also ==
- Trehörningen (disambiguation) ("The Three-Corner")
