= International College =

International College may refer to:

- International College, Beirut, Lebanon
- International College, Los Angeles, California, United States
- International College, Stockholm, Sweden
- London International College
- United International College, Zhuhai, Guangdong, China
- Hodges University (formerly known as International College), Naples, Florida
