= Liljeholmsbron =

Bridge in central Stockholm, Sweden

Coordinates: 59°18′49″N 18°01′56″E

Liljeholmsbron (Swedish: "The Liljeholmen Bridge") is a bridge in central Stockholm, Sweden. Stretching over Liljeholmsviken, it connects the western end of the major island Södermalm to the southern mainland district Liljeholmen.

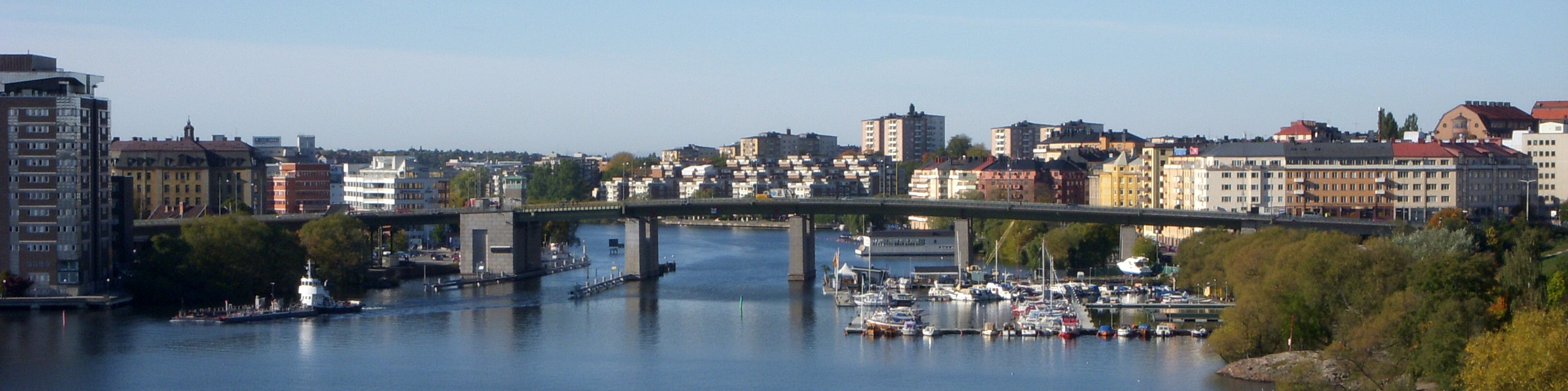
Liljeholmsbron viewed from the east.

== History ==
The first bridge to be built across the strait, then called Hornssundet, was a simple wooden bridge resting on poles built in the 1660s, within a few years replaced by a pontoon bridge defrayed by the city of Stockholm.

A more modern bridge extending the street Hornsgatan across the strait was evaluated in 1886, but the traffic load at the time, 500 vehicles per day in 1892, couldn't motivate the costs, and thus, in 1890, the old pontoon bridge was instead replaced by a new, 164 metres long, 83 .metre wides, and with a moveable section. After only a few years however, the increasing number of motor cars resulted in waiting periods extending up to 45 minutes at the raising of the bridge, and, in an attempt to reduce the traffic jam, the moveable raft was therefore supplied with an electrical device in 1909.

A decision in 1913 to construct a permanent wooden bridge with a steel swing section was intercepted by the plans to make the watercourse navigable. The resulting bridge, 8.6 metres wide and inaugurated in 1915, was supplied with two 20 metres wide swings, and also allowing the passage of trams, thus relieving the citizens from the daily walk across the bridge by tying the tram system in the city and that in the suburbs together.

After World War I, the augmenting traffic load combined with the increasing number of ships expected to follow the inauguration of the canal south of Södermalm, made it obvious the low bridge was soon to become insufficient. In 1925 it was subsequently decided a new elevated bridge should be built east of the old, thus extending Långholmsgatan over the strait. In 1928, a 390-metre-long (1,280 ft), 16-metre-wide (52 ft) bridge was inaugurated, with a flap extending the horizontal clearance of 15.5 metres to 24 metres.

By the end of World War II, however, traffic loads forced plans for a parallel bridge to be developed, and the new bridge, built 1951–1954, was made identical to the existing bridge; 390 metres in length, three spans of 40 metres each, and a flap on the west-most span.

== See also ==
- List of bridges in Stockholm
- Västerbron
- Årstabroarna
- Reimersholmsbron
- Tvärbanan
