= Liljeholmsviken =

Stretch of water in Sweden

Coordinates: 59°18′57″N 18°1′30″E

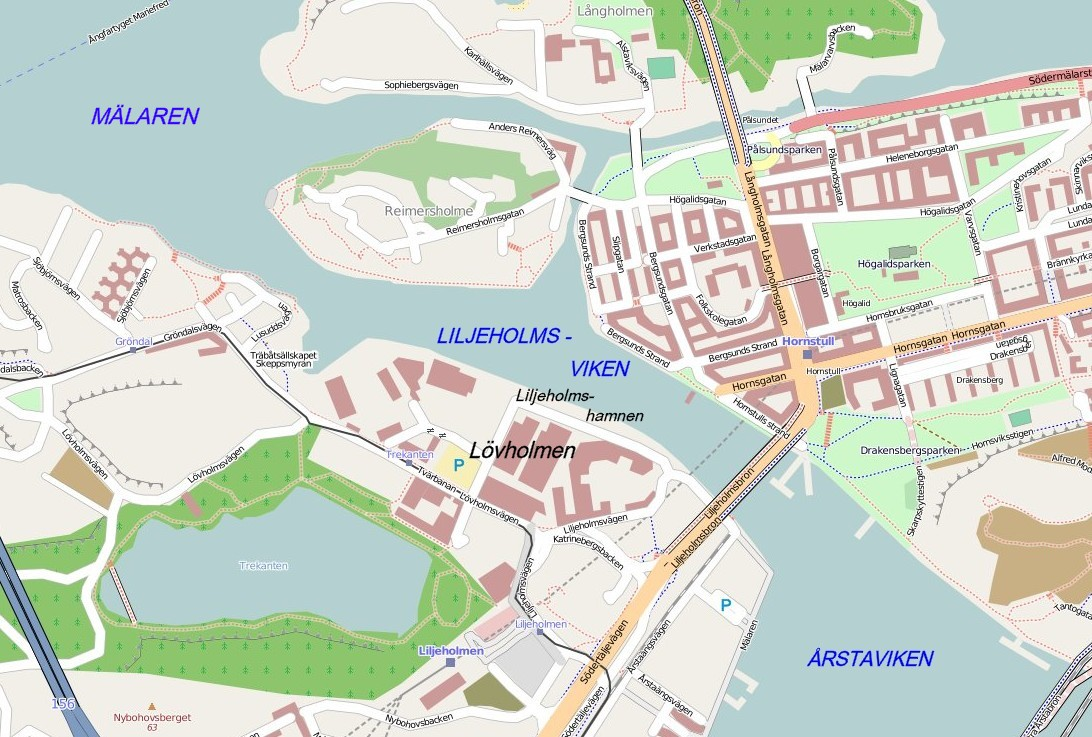
Liljeholmsviken and surroundings in 2009

Liljeholmsviken is a stretch of water in Stockholm, Sweden. It connects the eastern parts of Lake Mälaren to the Årstaviken bay, and separates Södermalm and Reimersholme, to the north, from Liljeholmen and Gröndal, to the south.

== Transport ==
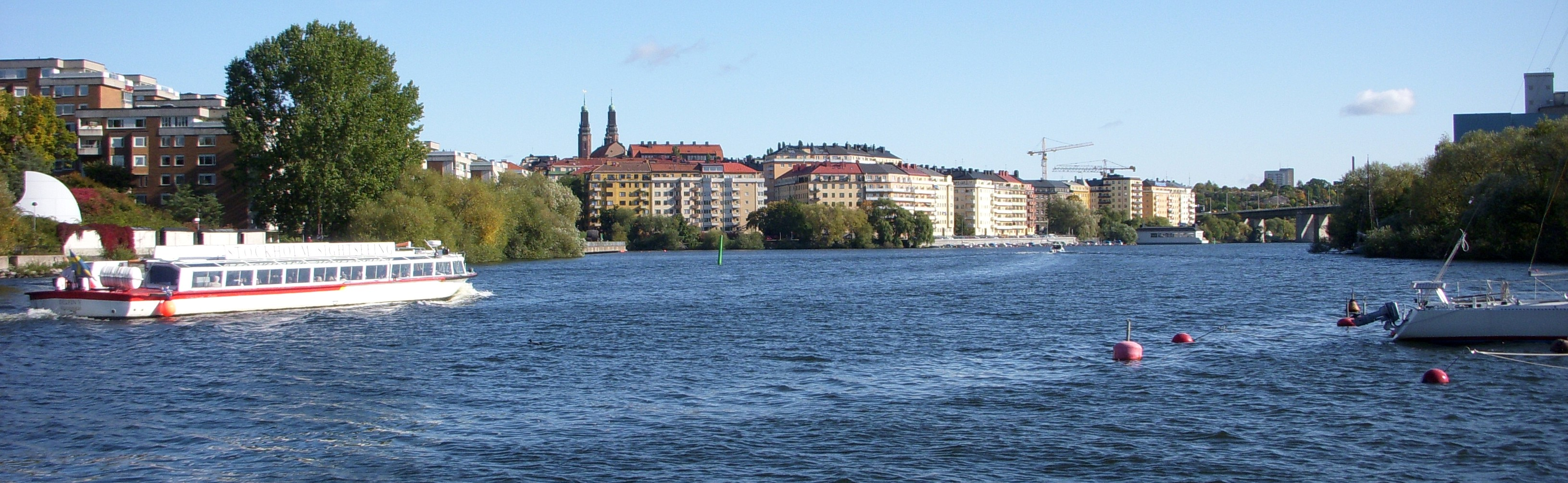
Liljeholmsviken looking east, with Liljeholmsbron in the distance

Liljeholmsviken was first bridged in the 1660s by the original Liljeholmsbron road bridge, and several subsequent bridges on the same alignment followed. In 1860, this was joined by a swing bridge carrying the Western Main Line railway. In 1929, both Liljeholmsviken and Årstaviken became part of the Hammarbyleden artificial navigation channel between Lake Mälaren and the Baltic Sea. As a consequence, a new and higher Liljeholmsbron was built, and the railway relocated east to cross the Årstaviken on the Årsta Bridge.

When the Red Line of the Stockholm Metro was built in the late 1950s, the line needed to pass under Liljeholmsviken. This was achieved using an immersed tube tunnel. The concrete tunnel sections were built in the large dry dock on Beckholmen and were then transported to Liljeholmsviken where they were sunk to form the tunnel.
