= Vinterviken =

Bay in southern Stockholm, Sweden

Coordinates: 59.31133°N 17.98783°E

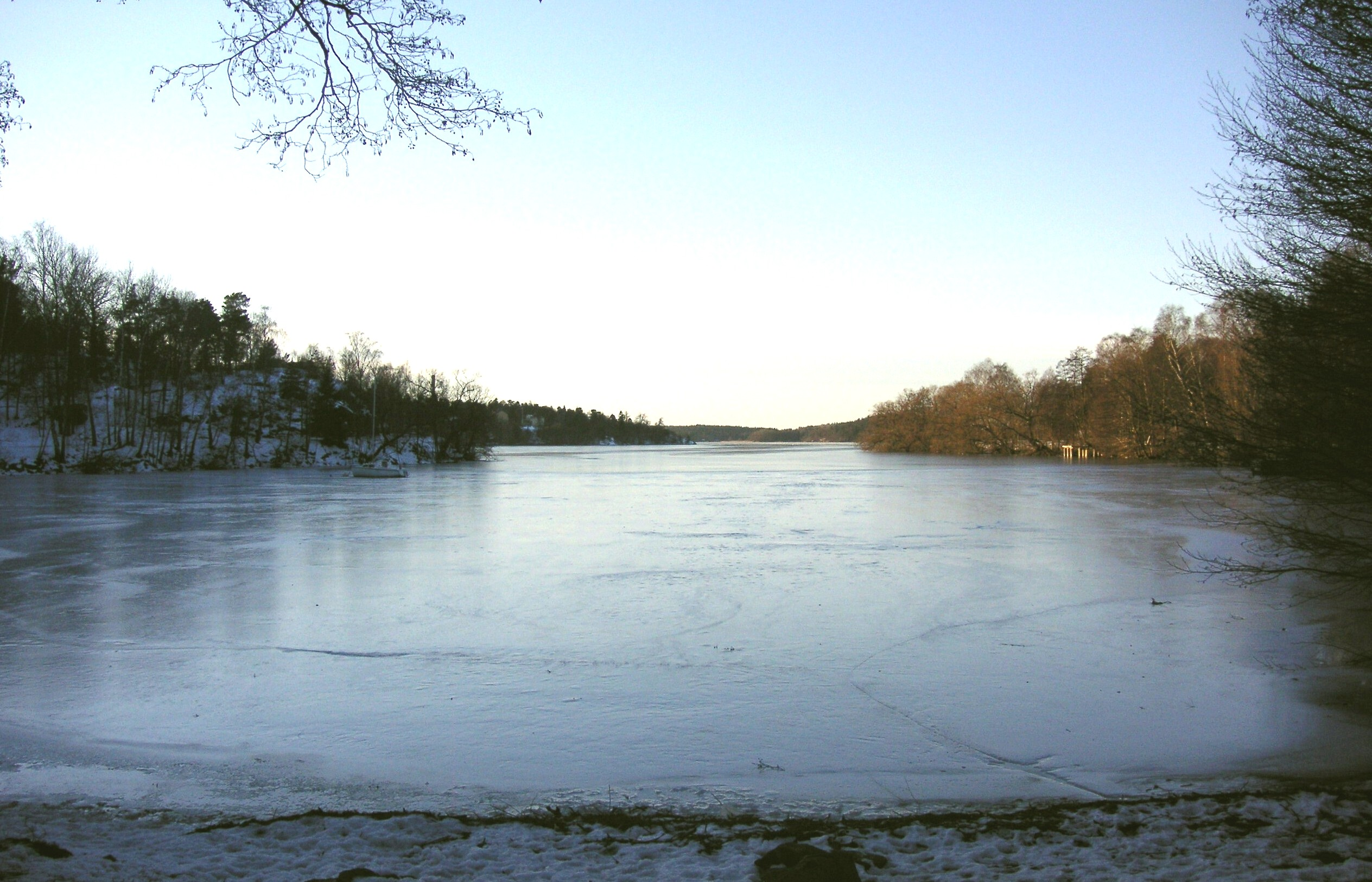
The actual cove in winter.

Vinterviken ("Winter-cove") is a bay in the Mälaren lake in southern Stockholm, Sweden. Vinterviken is located in a valley surrounded by the Gröndal and Aspudden suburb areas.

== Etymology ==
The origin of the name Vinterviken can be traced back to the 17th century. Back then a common winter route (on the lake ice) used to go from Fittja and the Mälaren islands, and entered the city through Vinterviken and lake Trehörningen (nowadays named Trekanten).

== Historical and cultural area ==
During its history, Vinterviken has transformed from a vital industrial area to a recreational region. The most important stage was when Alfred Nobel, a Swedish chemist, established his new research laboratory and factory there. In his Vinterviken laboratory, Nobel invented an enormous revolution for armaments and explosive manufacturing, dynamite.

=== Alfred Nobel’s factory ===
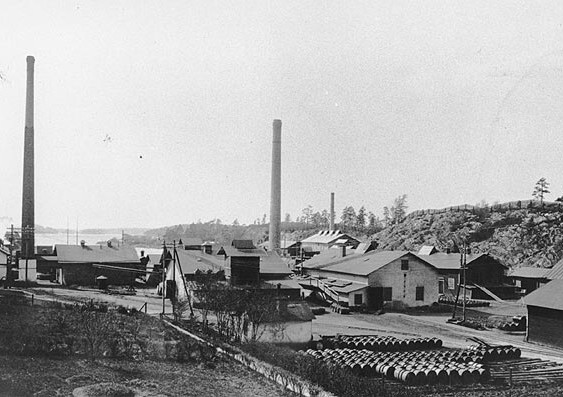
The factory area, ca. 1900

Nobel bought the whole area of Vinterviken in 1865. Due to safety issues he moved his research lab and his factory (Nitroglycerin Aktiebolaget) from a populated area in Stockholm to Vinterviken which was surrounded by cliffs and therefore suitable for his dangerous experiments. Gradually, Nobel developed the area by constructing a local rail-road, a harbour, testing grounds/tunnels (Nobels spränggropar) for exploring dynamite and also, housing for factory workers. Dynamite used to be manufactured in this area until 1921 but Nobel's factory remained working until the 1980s.

=== Recreation area ===
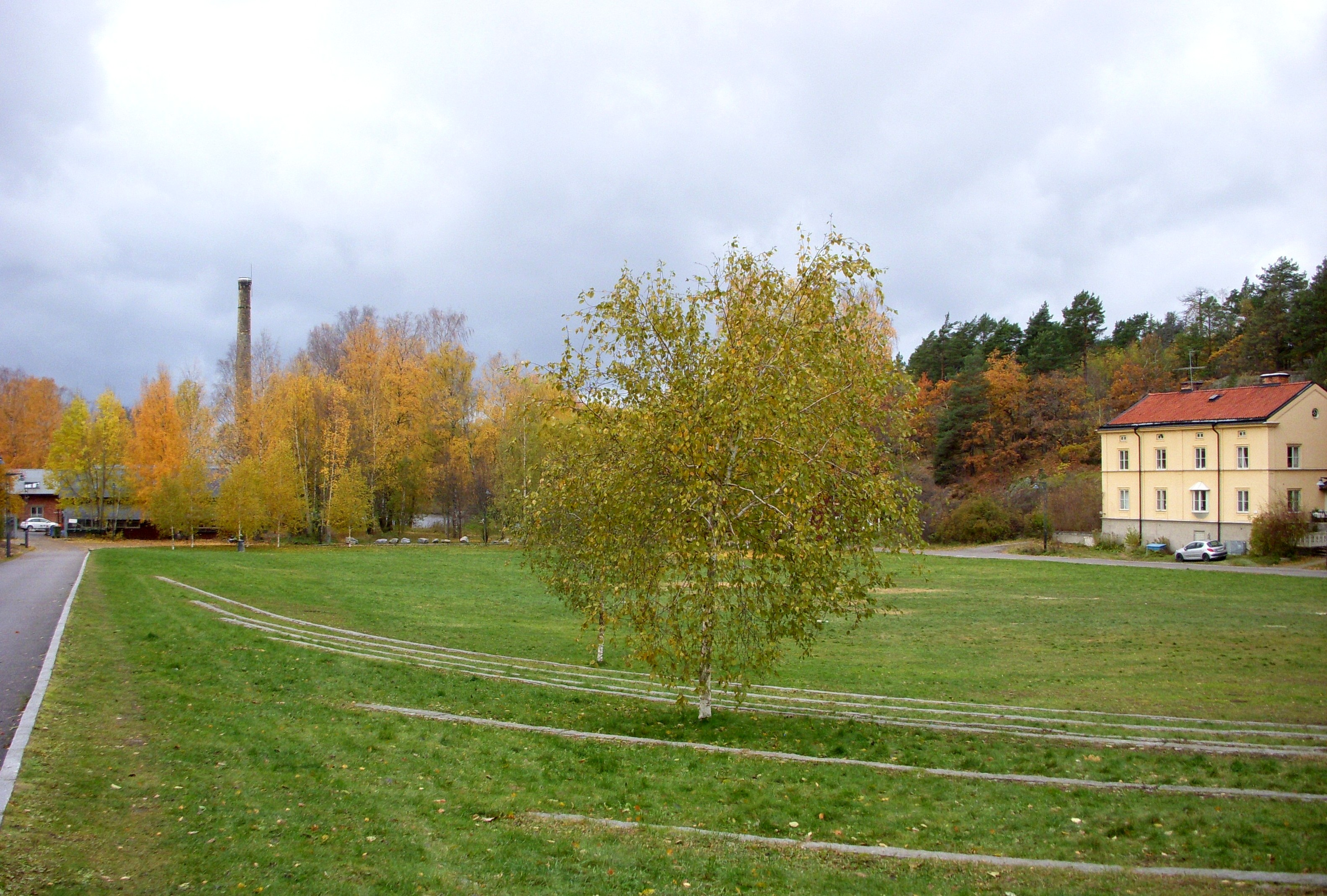
The former factory area is now a big lawn, popular for recreational activities in summer.

Since 1974 Stockholm city owns the Vinterviken region and by renovating this area has converted it from an industrial place to a public recreational area. A major reconstruction in the beginning of the 1990s provided the park with sculptures, walking paths, small gardens, restaurants and a cafe. One of the Nobel factory buildings has become a banquet hall called Winterviken. In the area are several places to swim among cliffs and pebbled shores. Vinterviken park also offers boating and canoeing services.

=== Environmental pollution ===
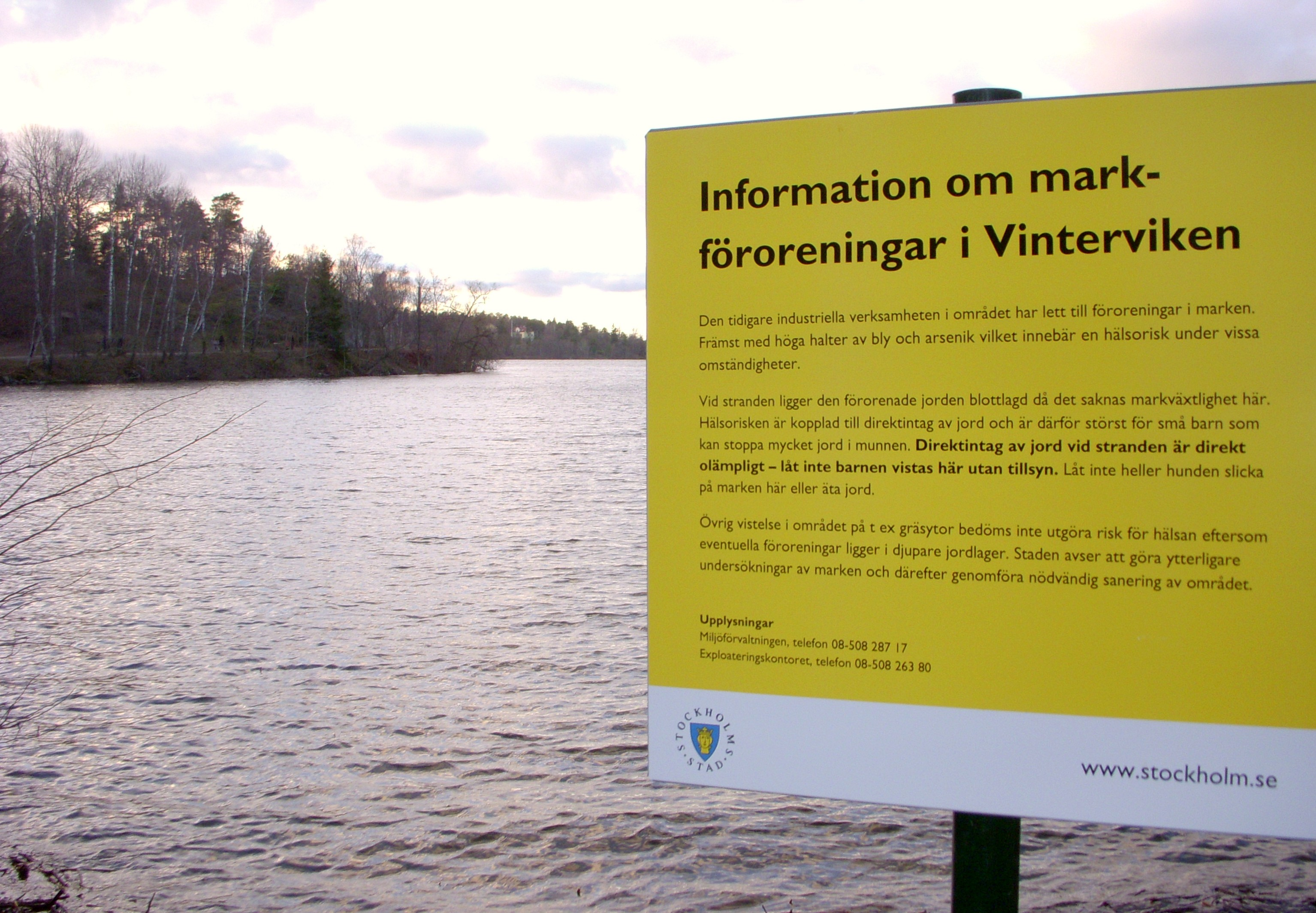
Warning sign from the city council about the pollution. Letting children and dogs ingest soil from the area is potentially dangerous.

The industrial activities in the Vinterviken since the 1860s have led to severe soil contamination in the area, with high levels of lead and arsenic. It was ranked in 2011 by the City of Stockholm as the ninth most polluted area in the city.

Unusually high levels of uranium have also been detected in the cove's bottom sediment, likely owing to the activities of a nuclear technology company which was previously residing in the area; however, the actual levels of radioactivity are considered low enough not to be considered a health risk.

== Vinterviken through history ==
Vinterviken:

	Year	Usage
1	17th century	An ice-crossing to Stockholm during Winter
2	1865	Alfred Nobel bought the entire area for his research
3	1866	Nitro-Nobel AB factory established
4	1868	A fatal explosion in Alfred's lab (14 casualties)
5	1921	Discontinued the manufacture of Dynamite
6	1980	Nitro-Nobel AB terminates its activities in the area
7	1974	The Stockholm city owned the area
8	1990	Reconstruction begins and Vinterviken became a recreational park
