= Mörtsjön, Tyresta =

Lake in Tyresta National Park, Sweden

Mörtsjön
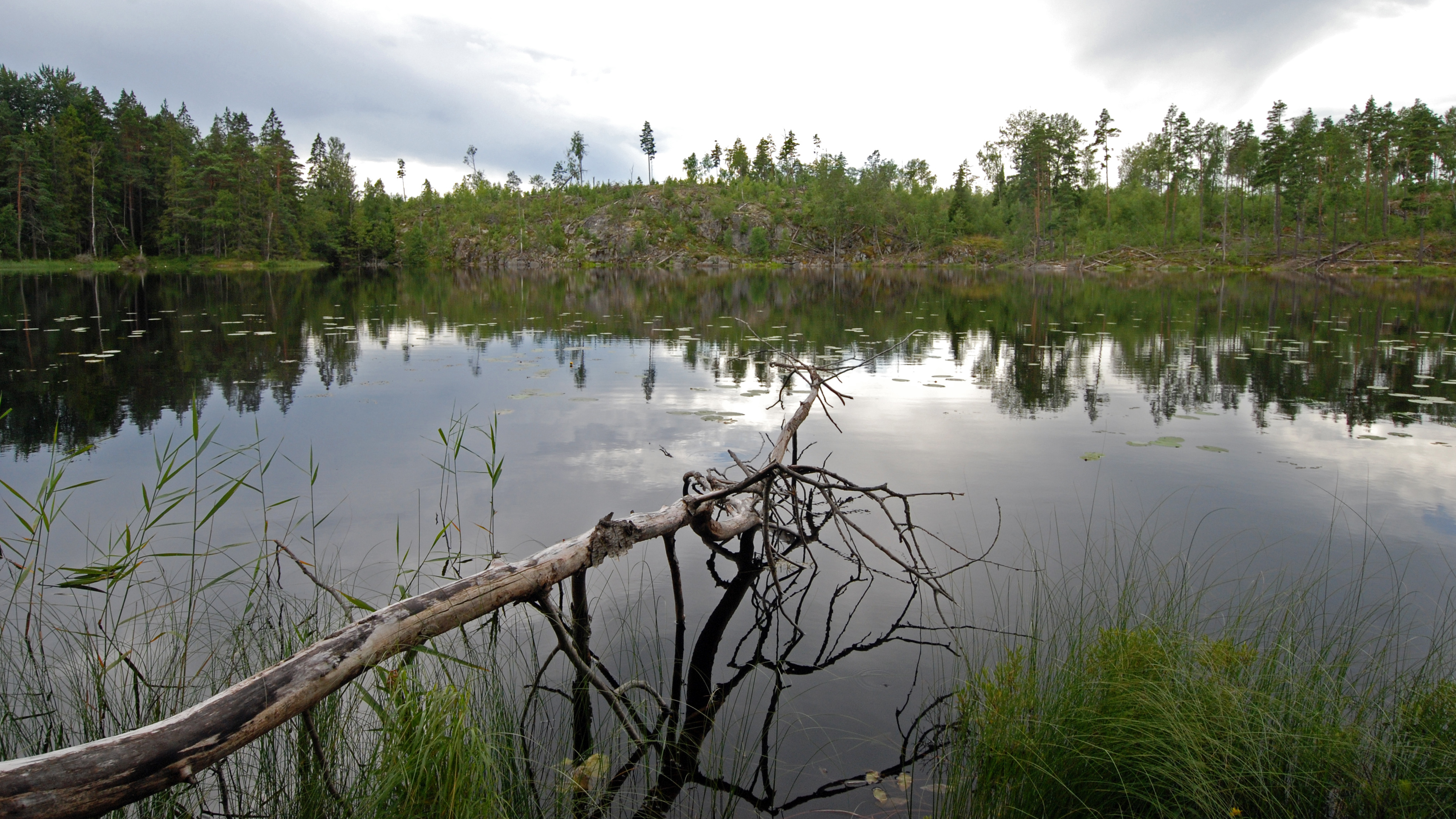

- Location within Stockholm
- Coordinates: 59°11′18″N 18°17′55″E
- Basin countries: Sweden

Mörtsjön is a lake in Stockholm County, Södermanland, Sweden. It is located in Tyresta National Park.
