= Årsjön, Tyresta =

Lake in Sweden

Årsjön
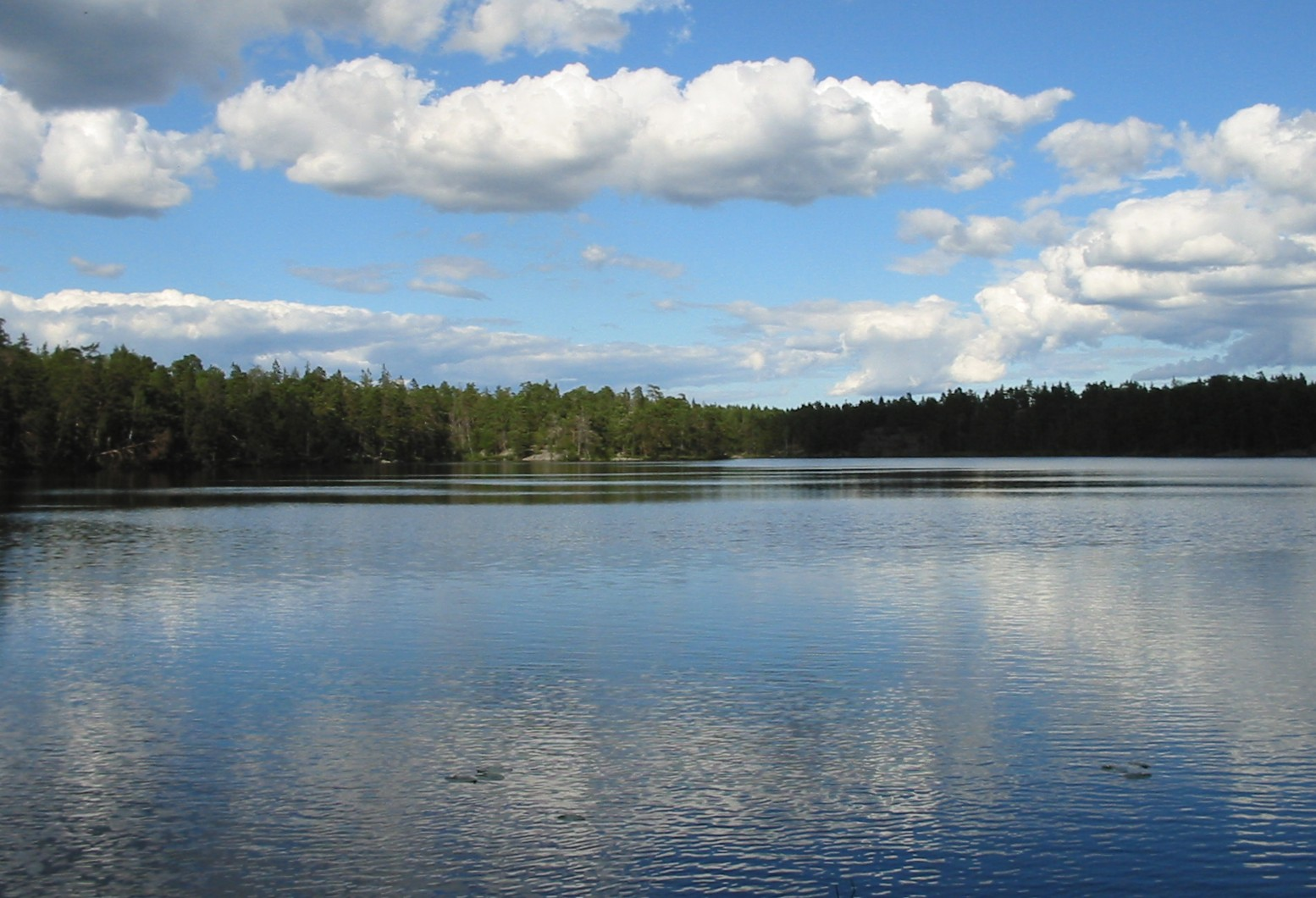
- Lake Årsjön, view towards north-east along the lake from the western shore.

- Location within Stockholm
- Coordinates: 59°11′23″N 18°16′20″E
- Basin countries: Sweden

Årsjön is a lake in Stockholm County, Södermanland, Sweden. It is located in Tyresta National Park.
