= Stensjön, Tyresta =

Lake in Tyresta National Park, Sweden

Stensjön
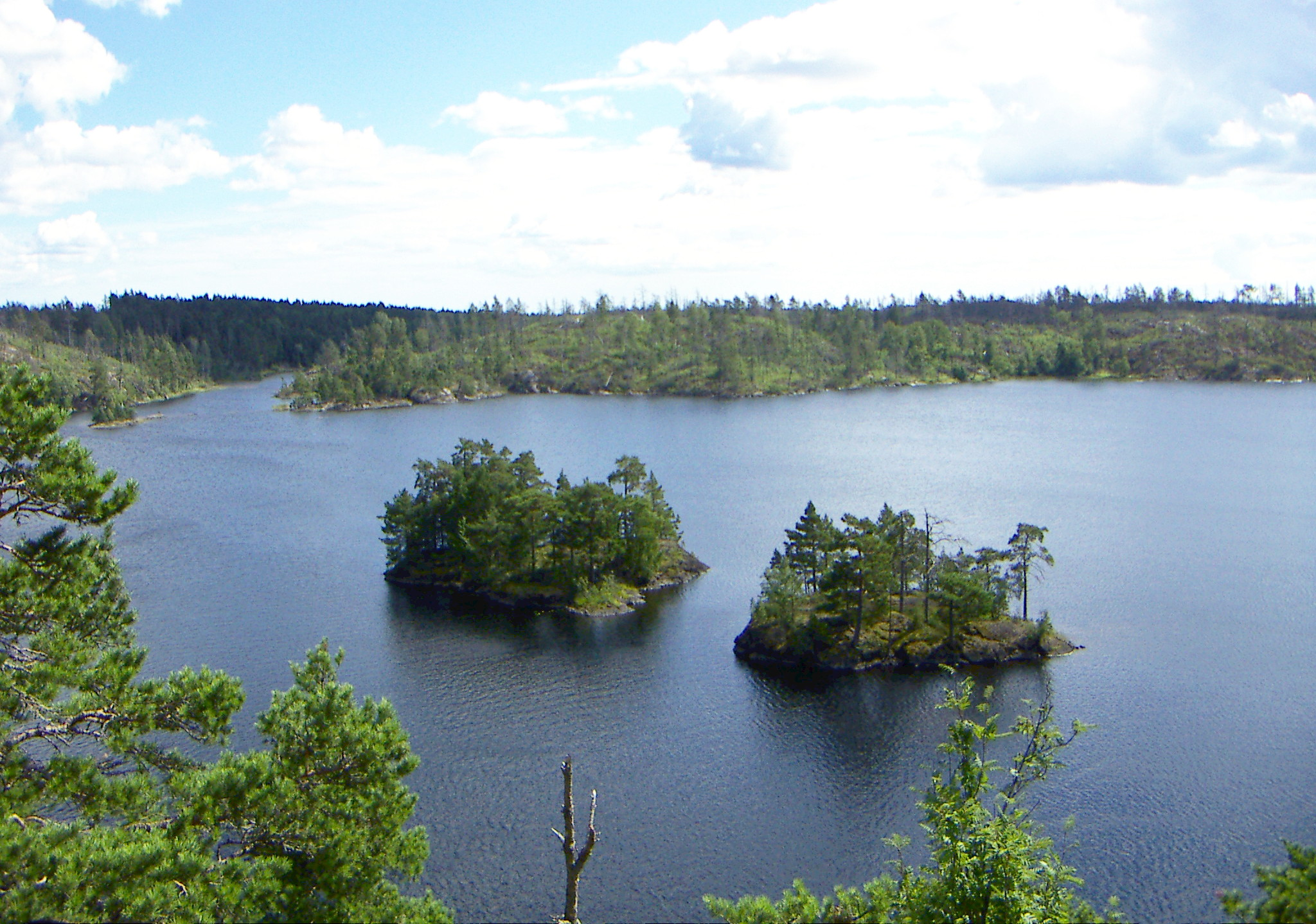

- Location within Stockholm
- Coordinates: 59°10′59″N 18°18′42″E
- Basin countries: Sweden
- Surface area: ~40 ha (99 acres)

Stensjön is a lake in Stockholm County, Södermanland, Sweden. It is the largest lake in Tyresta National Park.
