= Långsjön, Hanveden =

Lake in Huddinge Municipality, Sweden

Långsjön
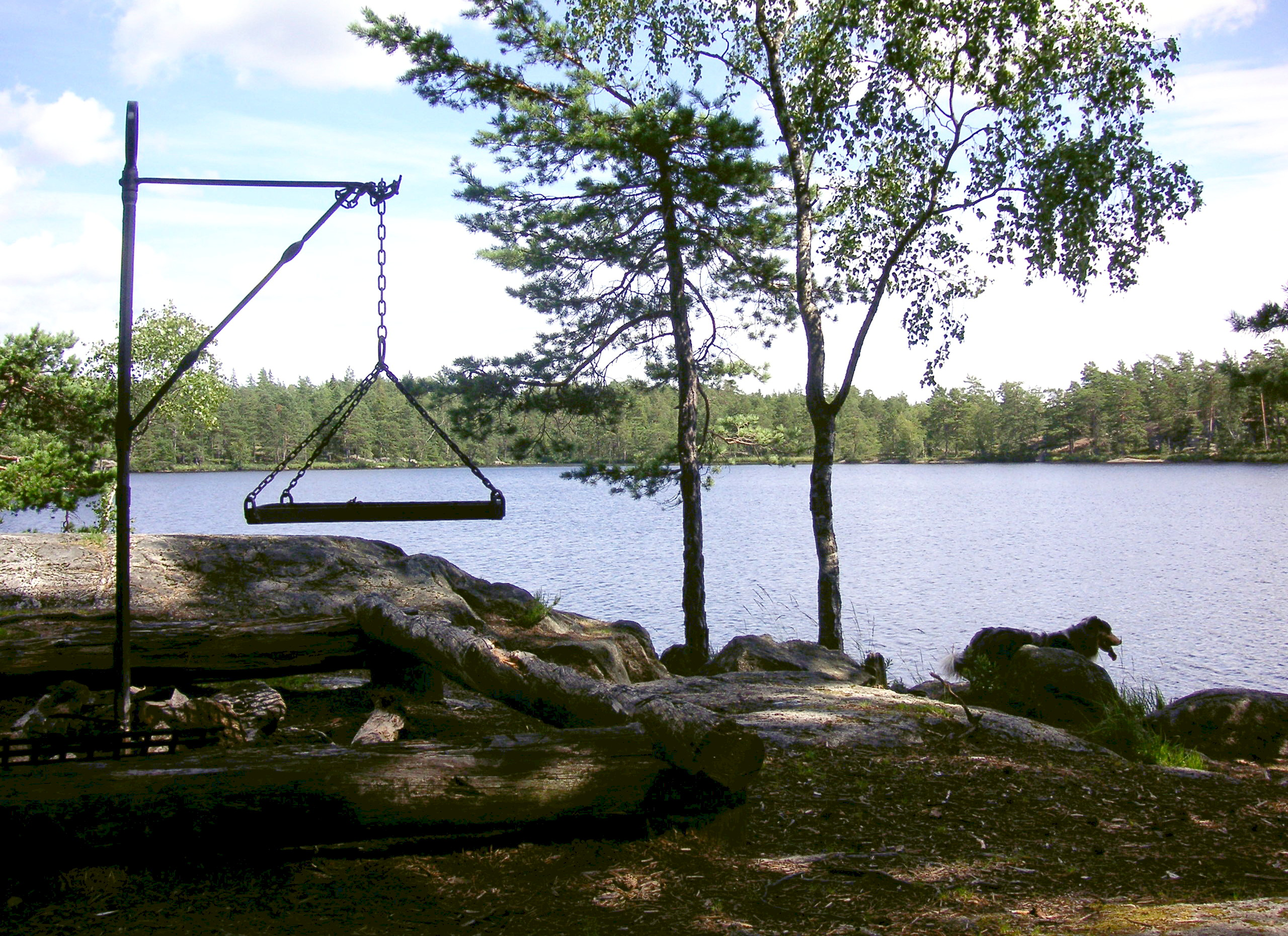

- Location within Stockholm
- Coordinates: 59°8′38.54″N 18°2′16.94″E
- Basin countries: Sweden

Långsjön is a lake in Stockholm County, Södermanland, Sweden.
