= Trehörningen, Hanveden =

Lake in Hanveden, Huddinge municipality, Sweden

Trehörningen
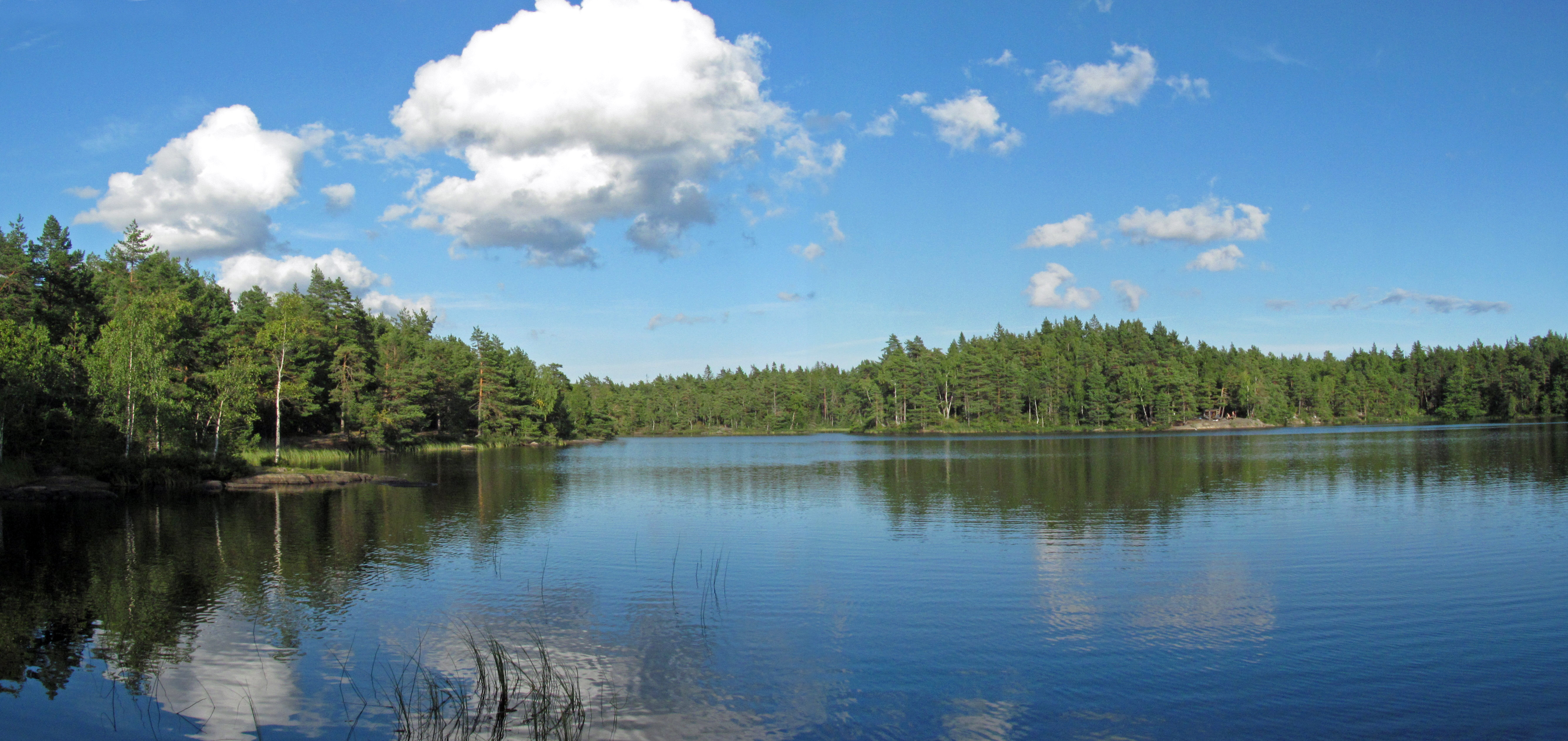

- Location within Stockholm
- Coordinates: 59°09′02″N 18°02′01″E
- Basin countries: Sweden
- Surface area: 0.0621 km^{2} (0.0240 sq mi)
- Average depth: 2.5 m (8 ft 2 in)
- Max. depth: 6.8 m (22 ft)
- Water volume: 150,000 m^{2} (1,600,000 sq ft)
- Surface elevation: 76.8 m (252 ft)

Trehörningen is a lake in Huddinge Municipality in Södermanland, which is part of Tyresån's main catchment area. The lake is 6.8 metres (22 ft) deep, covers an area of 0.0621 square kilometres (0.0240 sq mi) and is 76.8 metres (252 ft) above sea level. The lake is dewatered by the watercourse Lissmaån.

Trehörningen is located in Hanveden and Paradise Nature Reserve. The lake is the highest Tyresån lake system and is also the southernmost lake in that system.

Trehörningen is near several hiking trails, such as the Sörmland Trail and some that have their beginning at the paradise Paradiset, which is about 1 km (0.62 mi) from the Three Horses. The area around the lake consists largely of rocky fields with pine-dominated forest. The area is part of Paradise's nature reserve.
