= Tyresta National Park =

National park of Sweden

- Tyresta nationalpark
- IUCN category II (national park)
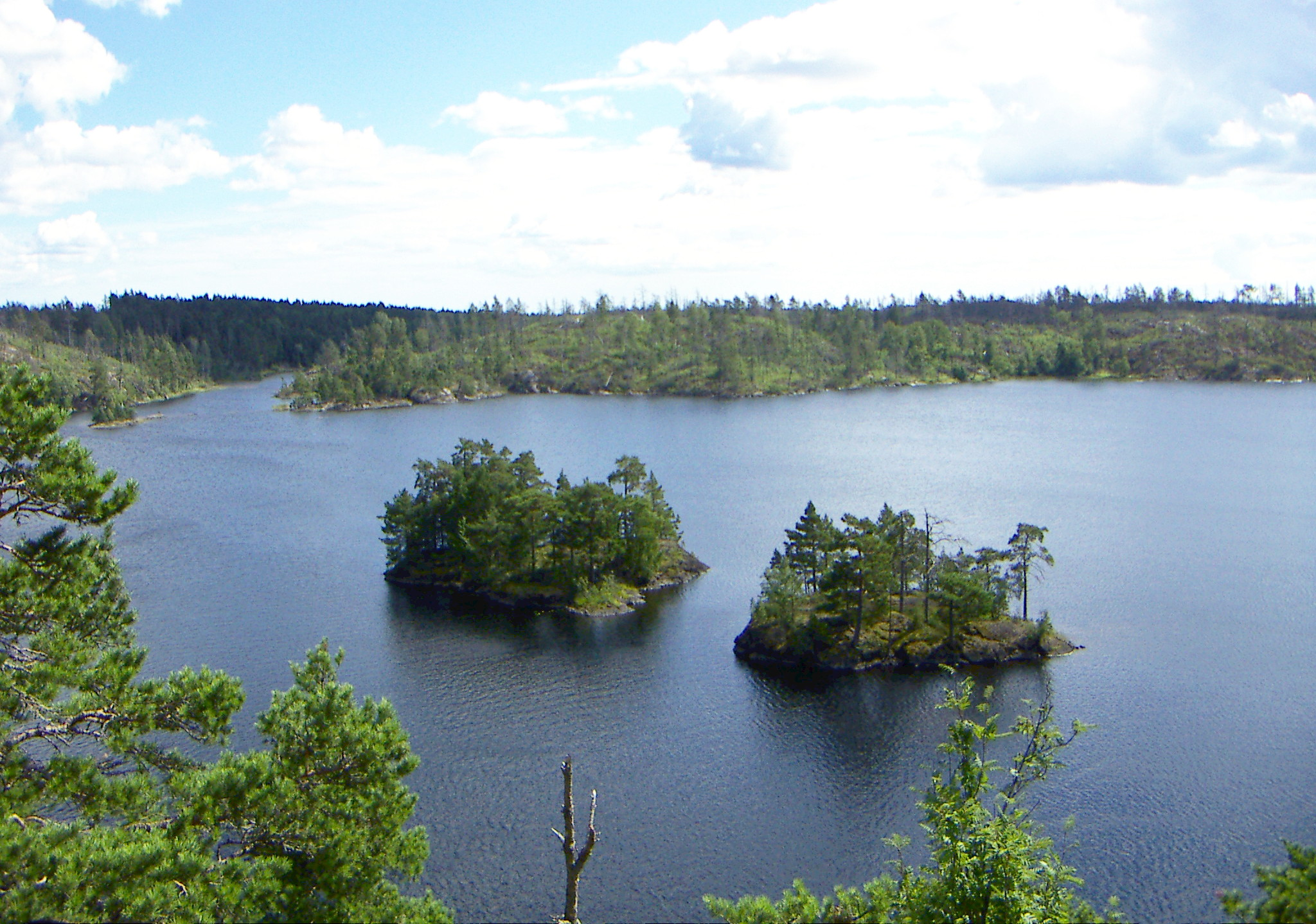
- Lake Stensjön
- Interactive map of Tyresta National Park
- Location: Stockholm County, Sweden
- Coordinates: 59°11′N 18°18′E
- Area: 20 km^{2} (7.7 sq mi)
- Established: 1993
- Governing body: Naturvårdsverket

National parks of Sweden (clickable map)

Tyresta National Park (Swedish: Tyresta nationalpark) is a national park with a surrounding nature reserve in Sweden, located in Haninge and Tyresö municipalities in Stockholm County.

== Geography ==
About 20 km (12 mi) from central Stockholm are the Tyresta National Park and Nature Reserve. The area is characterised by a rift valley landscape which is typical for central Sweden but unique in an international perspective. The national park has an area of 19.7 km^{2} (7.6 mi^{2}), and the surrounding nature reserve 27 km^{2} (10 mi^{2}), making the total protected area about 47 km^{2} (18 mi^{2}). It has been protected to preserve its noted natural values, e.g. one of the largest sections of untouched forest in southern Sweden, and to safeguard its importance for recreation.

=== Lakes and dams ===
The following lakes and dams are located within Tyresta National Park:

- Bylsjön
- Lanan
- Långsjön
- Mörtsjön
- Nedre dammen
- Stensjön
- Trehörningen
- Årsjön

== Plants and animals ==
The park and reserve are notable for containing one of the largest coniferous old-growth forests in southern Sweden, with some parts of the forest containing pine trees up to 400 years old. Ridge tops are dominated by scotch pine while lowlands are dominated by Norwegian spruce. Common broad leaf tree species are aspen, birch, and alder. Much of the park has a low site index leading to very old trees with slow growth rates and comparatively low DBH. Blueberries are a common understory species in the park and can be easily found.

The park also has deciduous broadleaf forests, open arable land and historical buildings of cultural interest. A typical feature of primeval forest is the great number of plant and animal species. Up to 8,000 species of animals can be found here which is four times as many as in managed forests. Many species are also completely dependent on primeval forest as their habitats and can not survive under other conditions.

=== Fire ===
In August 1999, about 10% of the national park area was consumed in a fire. The hot and dry conditions in the area at the time were optimal for a forest fire to start. While the fire results in high tree mortality in the burn area, much of the tree species have recovered and saplings are common. However, due to the low site index it will take decades before the trees become canopy species.

== Gallery ==
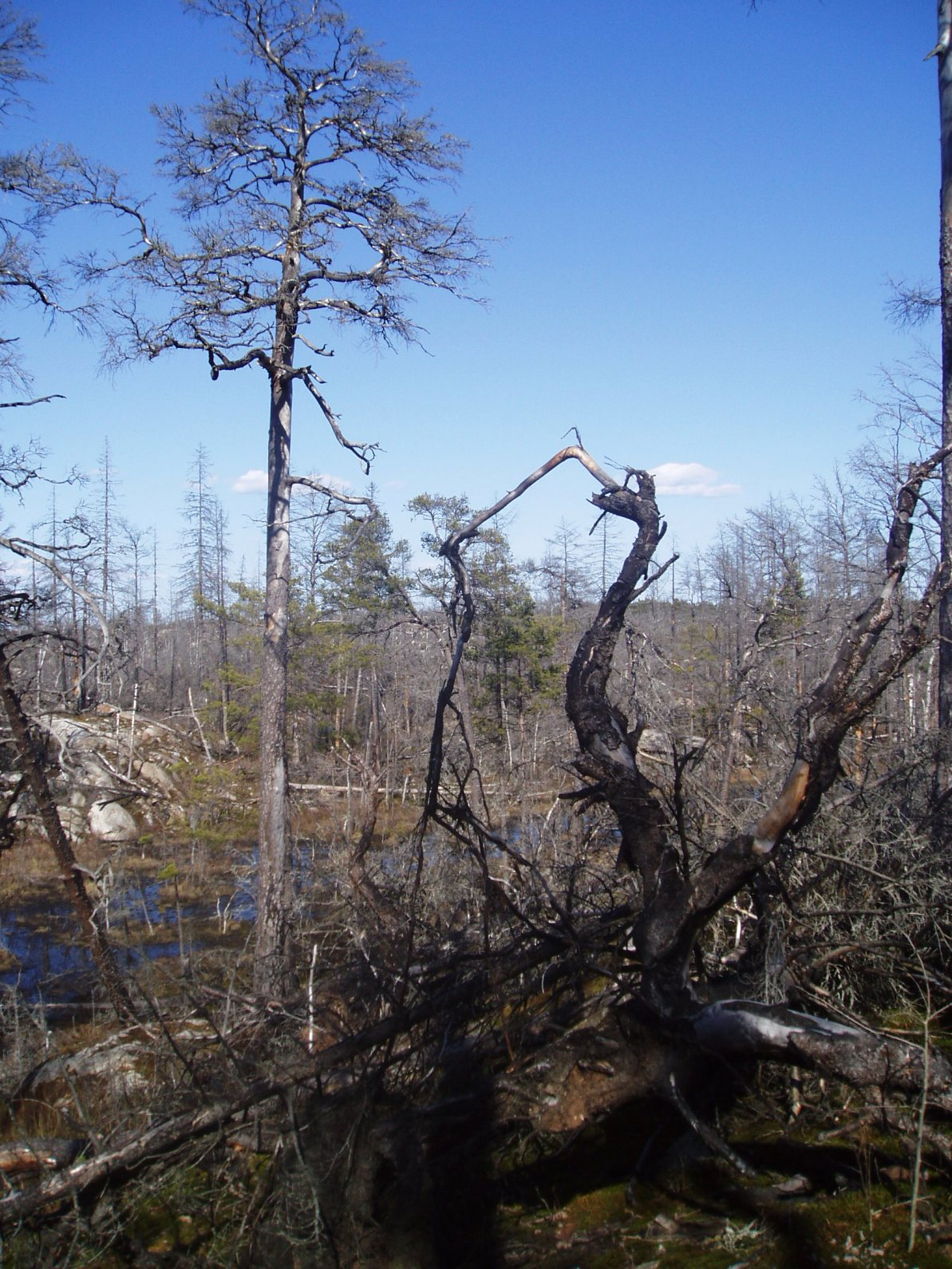
Six years after the fire

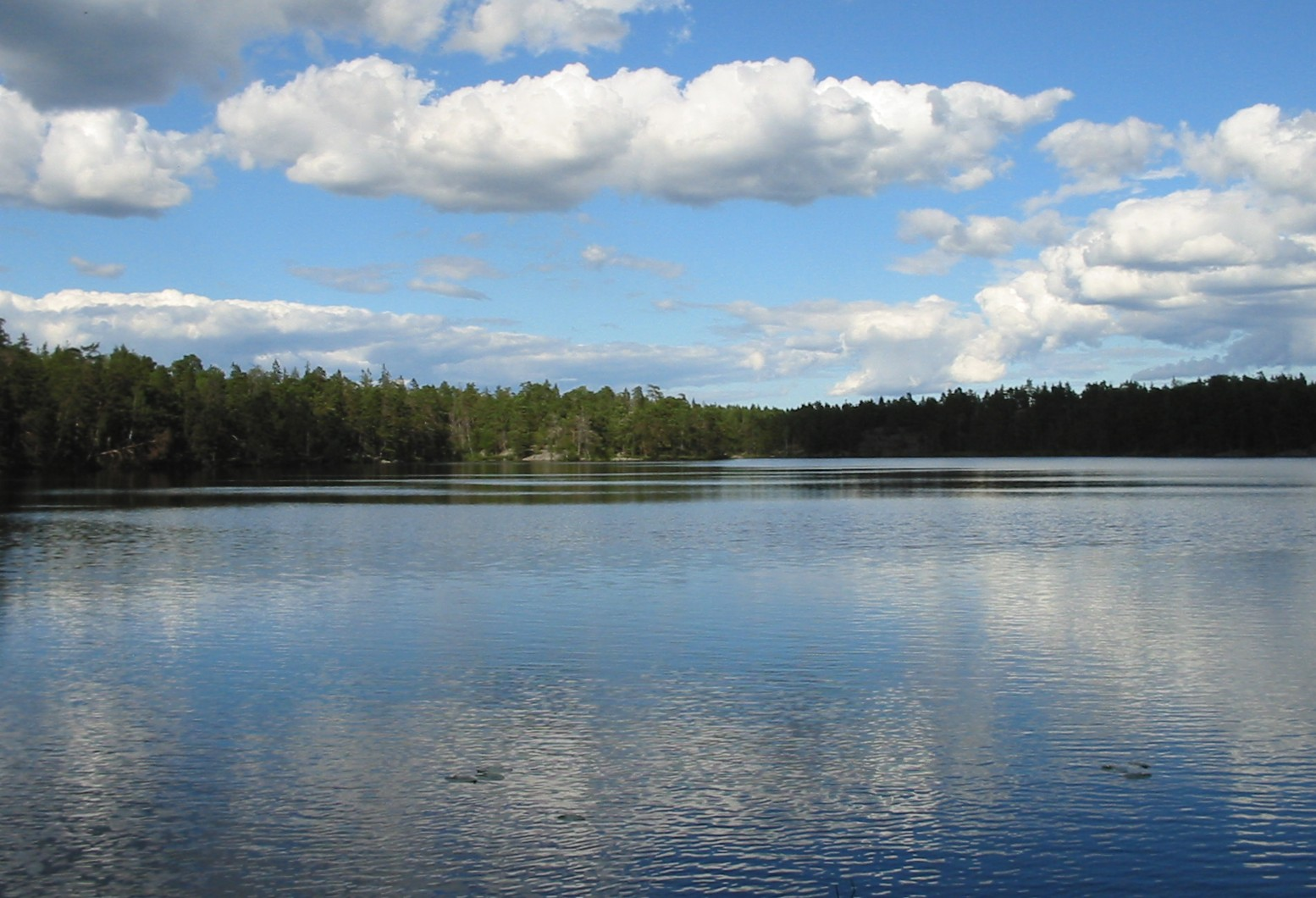
Lake Årsjön

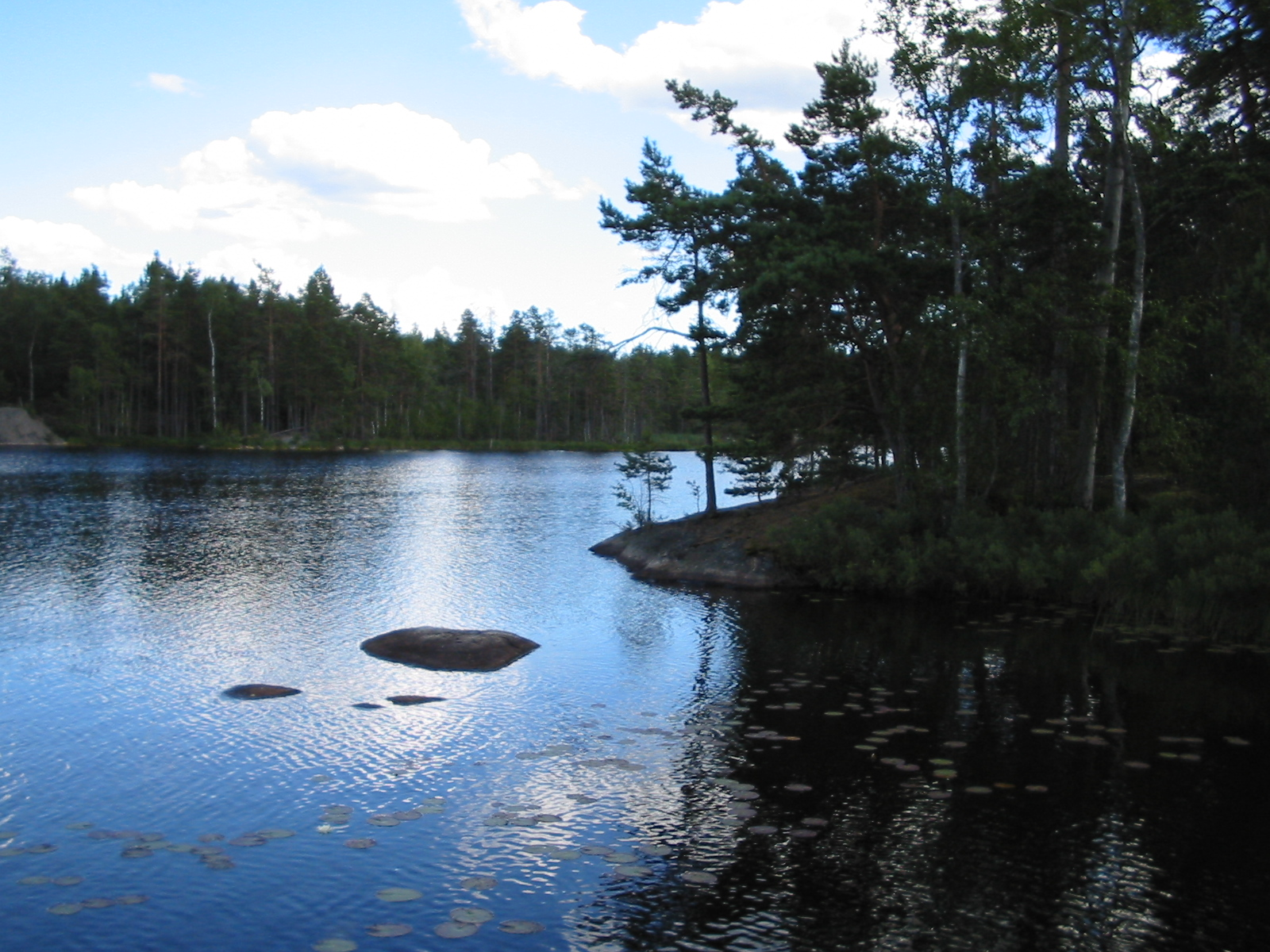
Lake Årsjön

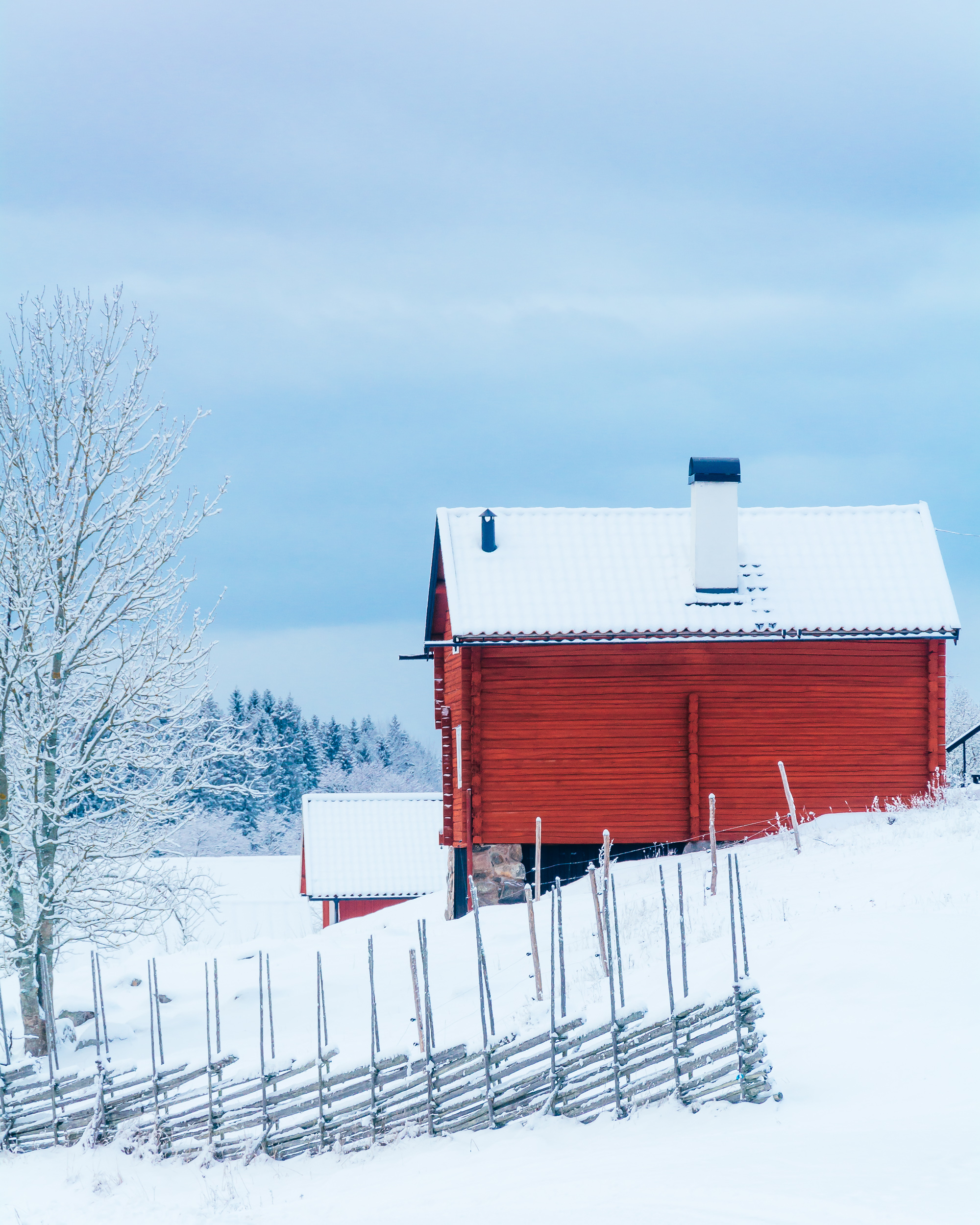
A typical Swedish building in Tyresta National Park, painted in red. Winter of 2018-19.

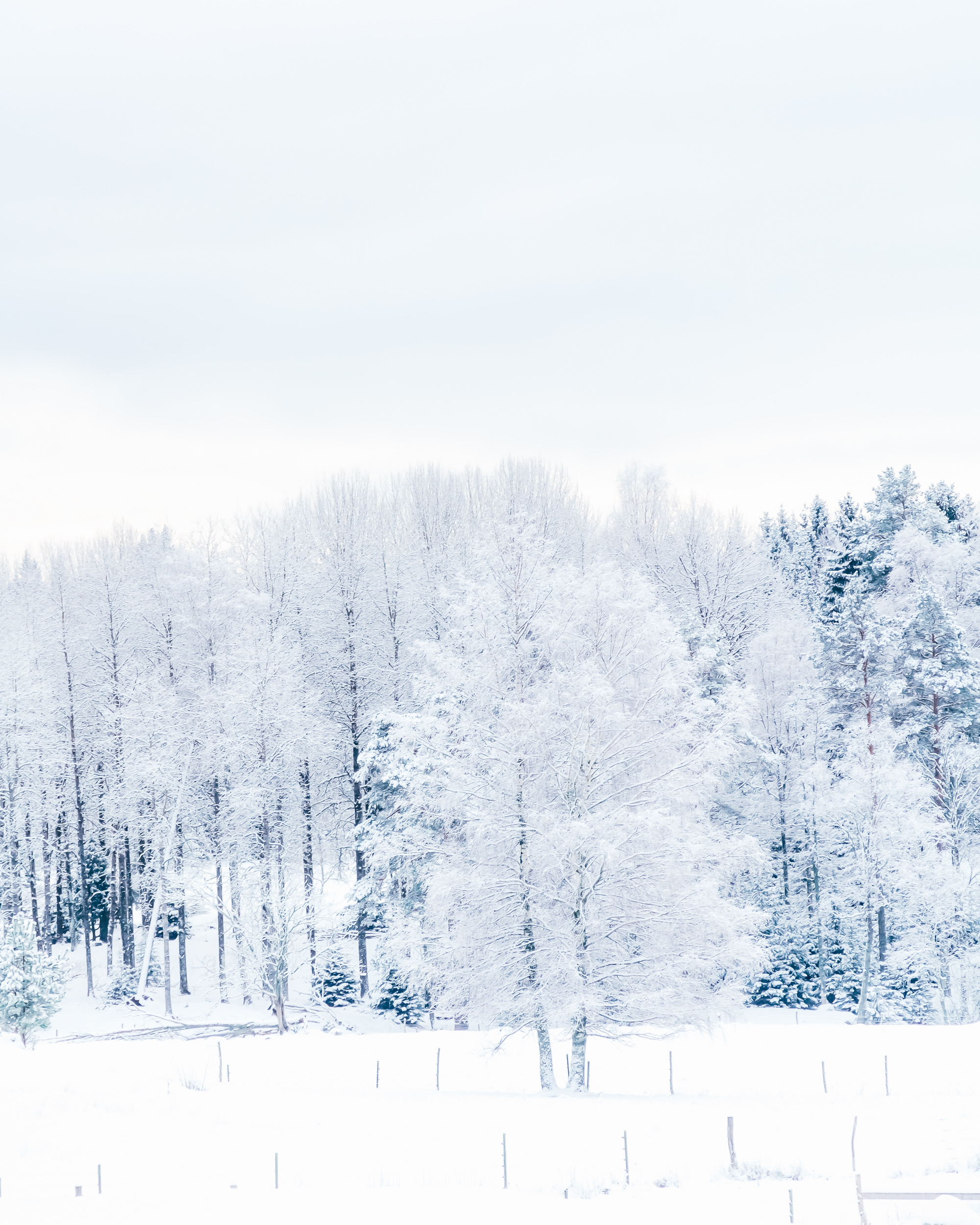
A tree in Tyresta National Park, covered in snow during the winter of 2018-19.
