= Årstaviken =

Bay in Sweden

Coordinates: 59°18′21″N 18°03′00″E

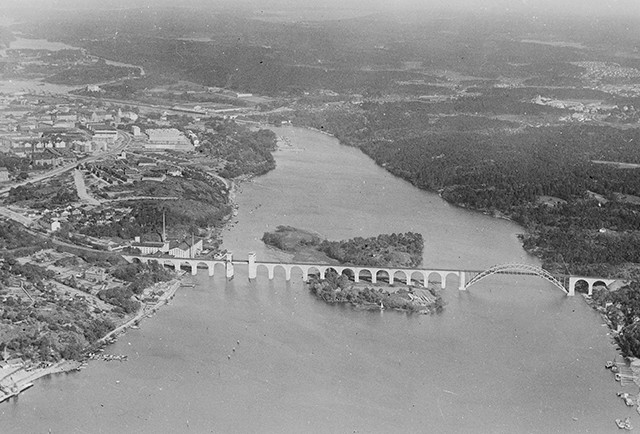
Årstaviken and the Årsta bridge in the 1930s.

Årstaviken is a bay in Stockholm, Sweden. It is connected to the eastern parts of Lake Mälaren by the Liljeholmsviken. It is bordered by the Södermalm, Liljeholmen and Årsta neighborhoods of Stockholm.

Since 1929, both Liljeholmensviken and Årstaviken have been among the natural waterways that form part of the Hammarbyleden artificial navigation channel between Lake Mälaren and the Baltic Sea.
