= Långsjön, Tyresta =

Lake in Tyresta National Park, Sweden

Långsjön
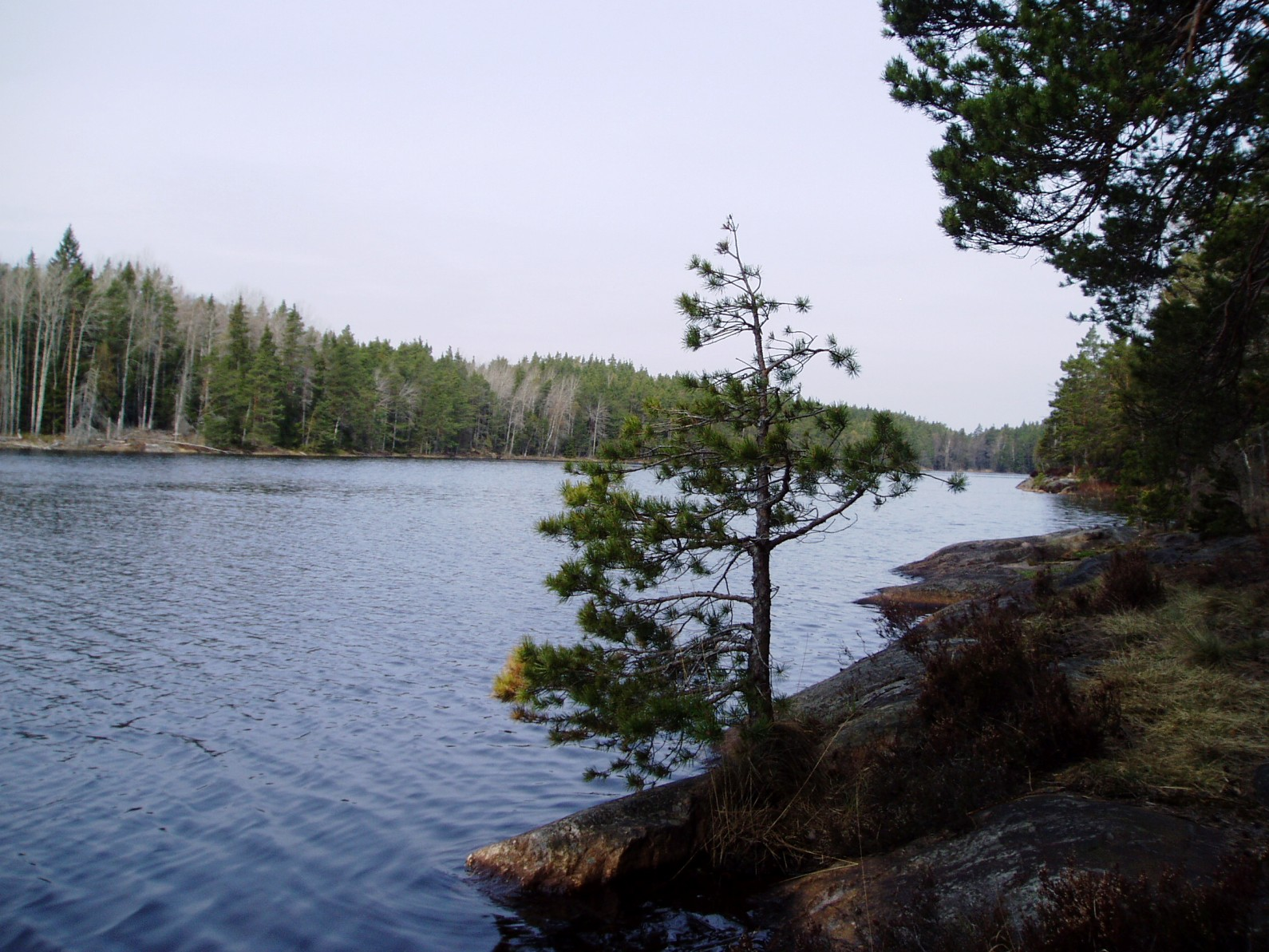

- Location within Stockholm
- Location: Tyresö Municipality
- Coordinates: 59°11′45″N 18°17′38″E
- Basin countries: Sweden

Långsjön, Tyresta is a lake in Stockholm County, Södermanland, Sweden. It is located in Tyresta National Park.
