= Internationella kunskapsgymnasiet =

Independent secondary school in Stockholm, Sweden

Coordinates: 59.308872°N 18.027149°E

Kunskapsgymnasiet Liljeholmen
- Liljeholmen, Stockholm; Sweden

Information
- Former name: Internationella gymnasiet
- Established: 1998; 28 years ago
- Enrollment: 370 (1998)
- Website: https://www.kunskapsgymnasiet.se/internationella/

Kunskapsgymnasiet Liljeholmen (ex. Internationella kunskapsgymnasiet) is an independent gymnasium (upper secondary school) in Liljeholmen in Stockholm, Sweden. It was established in 1998 as Internationella gymnasiet with approximately 370 students.

In the summer of 2006, the school was sold to the company Kunskapsgymnasiet, thereby becoming Internationella Kunskapsgymansiet.

In the autumn of 2007, the school switched premises.

In the summer of 2021, the school changed name to Kunskapsgymnasiet Liljeholmen.

The school was permanently closed in June 2025 as Kunskapsgymnasiet Liljeholmen was merged with Kunskapsgymnasiet Globen to create Kunskapsgymnasiet Stockholm.
