= Trehörningen, Tyresta =

Lake in Tyresta National Park, Sweden

Trehörningen
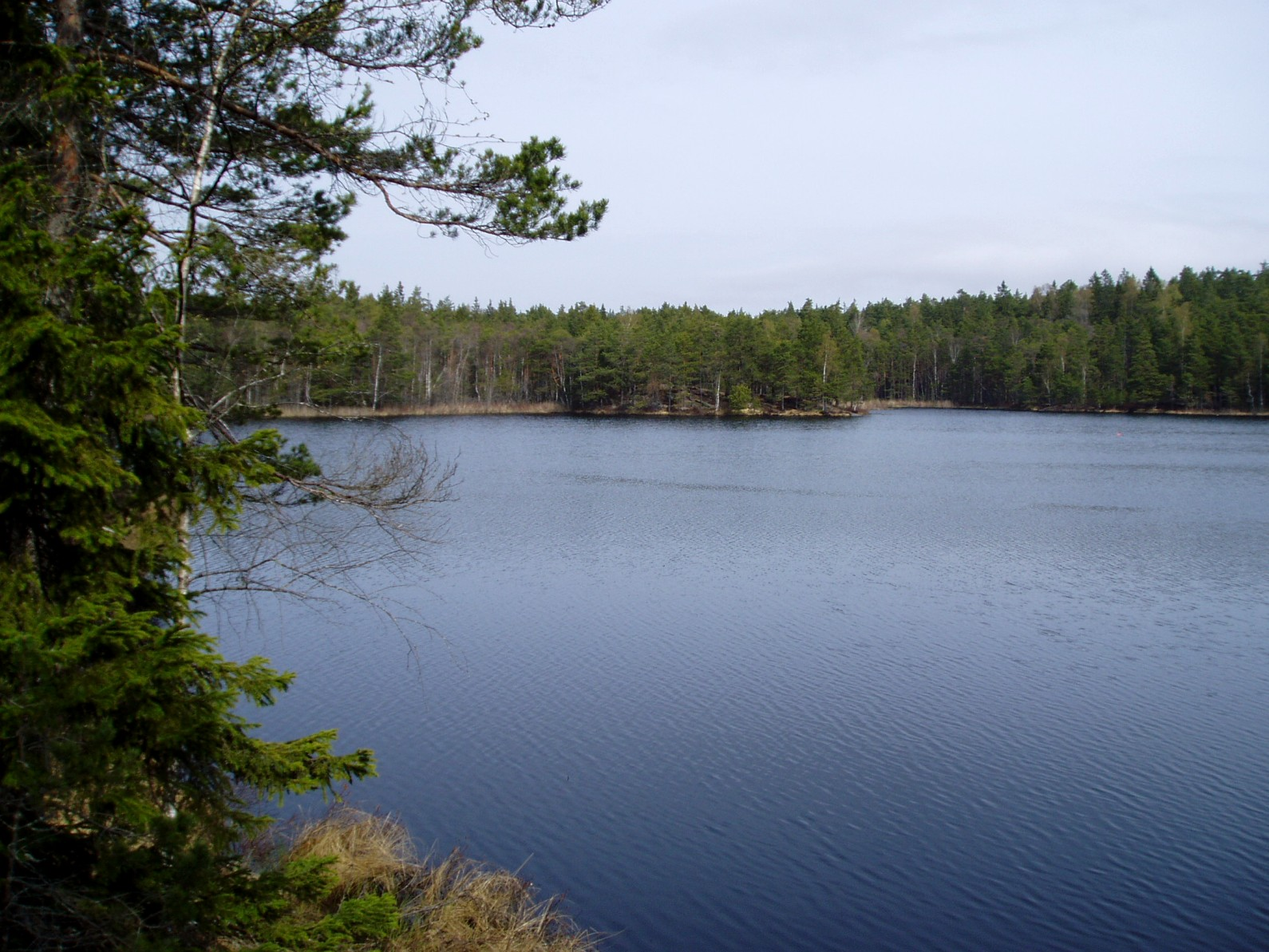
- Lake Trehörningen, in Tyresta National Park

- Location within Stockholm
- Coordinates: 59°11′46″N 18°17′55″E
- Basin countries: Sweden

Trehörningen is a lake in Tyresta National Park in Stockholm County, Sweden.
