= Gröndal =

District of southern Stockholm, Sweden

Coordinates: 59°19′N 18°00′E

- District
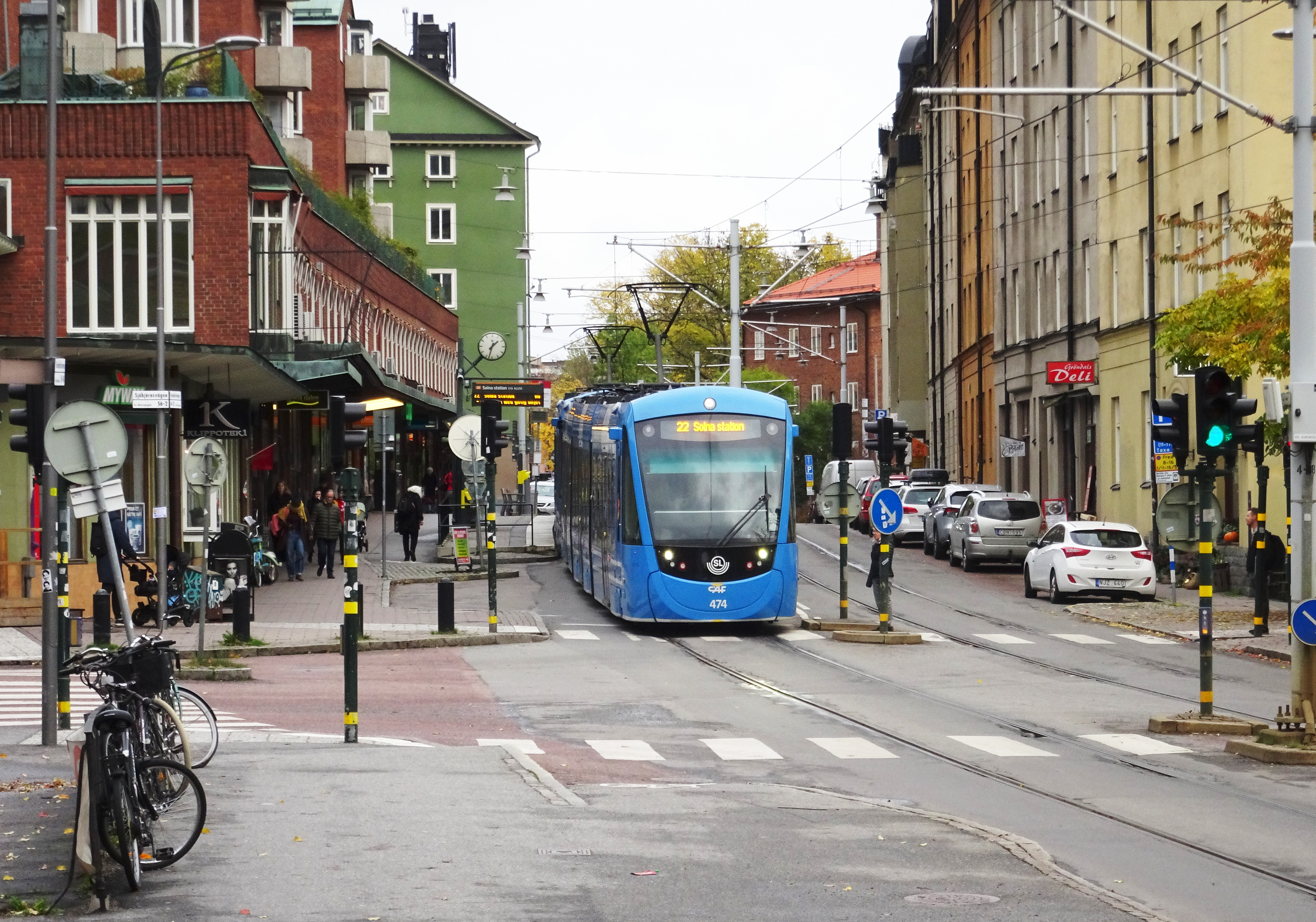
- Interactive map of Gröndal
- Borough: Hägersten-Liljeholmen
- Established: 1926

Gröndal (Green Valley) is a district of the Hägersten-Liljeholmen borough in Söderort, the southern suburban part of Stockholm, Sweden. The name Gröndal means Green Dale or Green Valley. Gröndal developed as a working class and industrial suburb after the opening of Liljeholmen freight station in the 1860s. The district was a part of Liljeholmen municipal community in the Brännkyrka municipality until 1913, when Brännkyrka was incorporated into the city of Stockholm.
