= Årstabroarna =

Two parallel railway viaducts in Stockholm, Sweden

Coordinates: 59°18′33″N 18°02′38″E

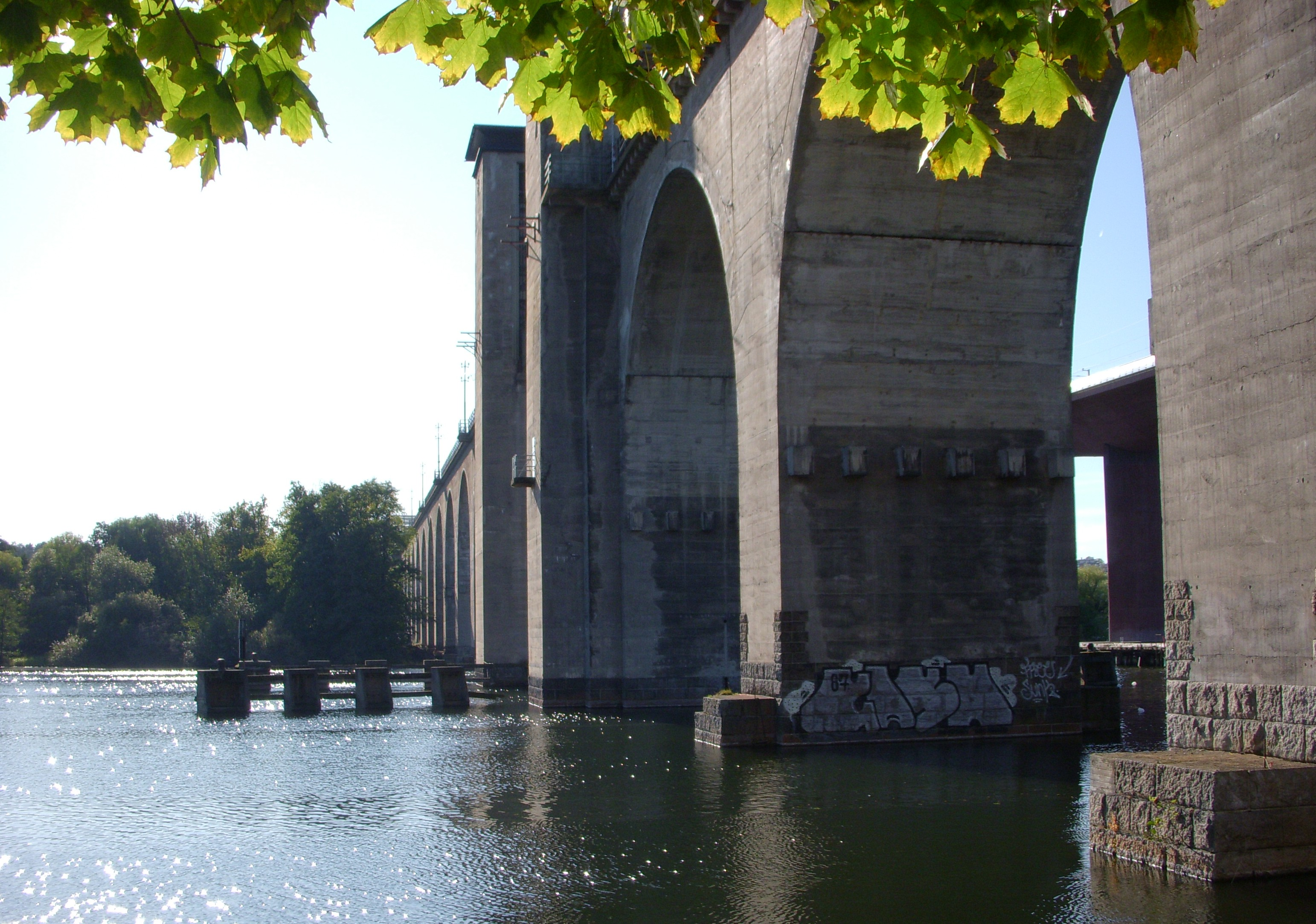
Eastern Årsta Bridge viewed from Södermalm.

Årstabroarna (English: The Årsta bridges) are two parallel railway viaducts in central Stockholm, Sweden. Passing over the watercourse of Årstaviken and the islets Årsta holmar, they connect the major island Södermalm to the southern mainland district Årsta.

== Eastern Årsta Bridge ==
The eastern bridge, the older of the two and still often referred to as Årstabron ("The Årsta Bridge"), is still in operation almost 100 years after its inauguration in 1929. When projected in the early 1920s, an agreement between the state and the city stipulated the arterial railway passing through the city had to be made independent of the sea route passing beneath it. It was therefore decided that the railway should be relocated to a bridge passing over Årsta holmar, with a horizontal clearance of 26 metres ensured by a bascule bridge over the northern passage, and a truss arch bridge (The truss is the old one) over the southern passage offering a span of 100 metres.

In front of a reworked agreement in 1925, the city, intending to add an iron roadway passing above the present railway, required the bridge to be reinforced accordingly, and additionally it was decided the planned bascule bridge should be replaced by a lift bridge. The plans were carried through and the 753-metre-long (2,470 ft) bridge opened in 1929.

The bridge, on its completion the longest bridge in Sweden, was designed be the architect Cyrillus Johansson (1884–1959) and the engineers Ernst Nilsson (1874–1946) and Salomon Kasarnowsky (1887–1960). It has often been compared to a classical Roman aqueduct, and is today declared a historical landmark.

Possible ways of adding car lanes atop the bridge were discussed on several occasions during the remainder of the 20th century, the most elaborate plans, in 1960, being to have a motorway, called Tantoleden, connect Ringvägen and Årsta by building a new bridge on the west side of the old.

== Western Årsta Bridge ==
A western bridge, designed by Sir Norman Foster (1935-), 833 metres long and 19,5 metres wide, was finally inaugurated in 2005. Along with the new bridge a new commuter train station, Årstaberg, was created south of the bridges. Twice the width of the old, thus permitting an elevated pathway next to the railway, the pillars of the new bridge are not only much more slender, but also reduced to ten, less than half of the old. Foster had the concrete of the new bridge pigmented with iron oxide. The bridge's construction was preceded by two decades of fiery debate, and it was nicknamed falukorven (a Swedish sausage) by its critics due to its colour's resemblance to falu red, a traditional deep red colour.

== Gallery ==
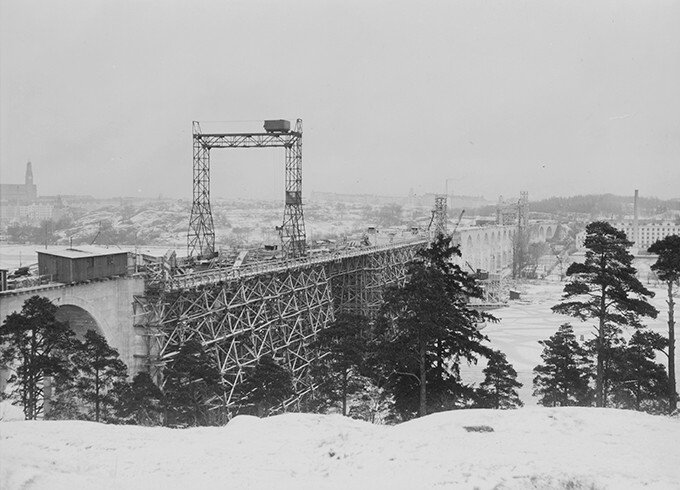
Eastern bridge ca 1925

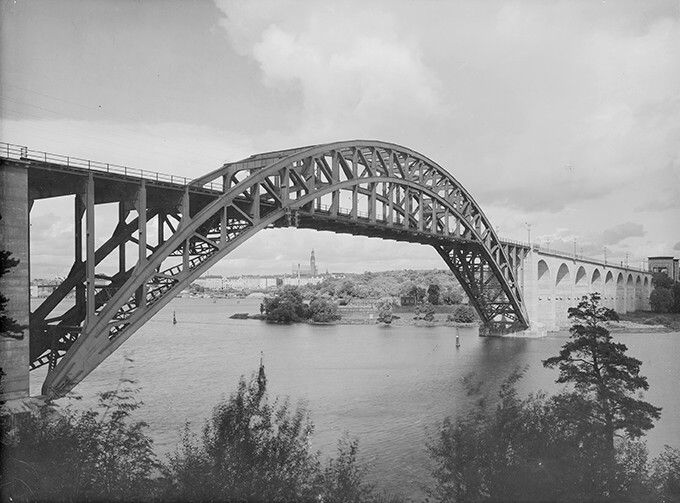
Eastern bridge ca 1930

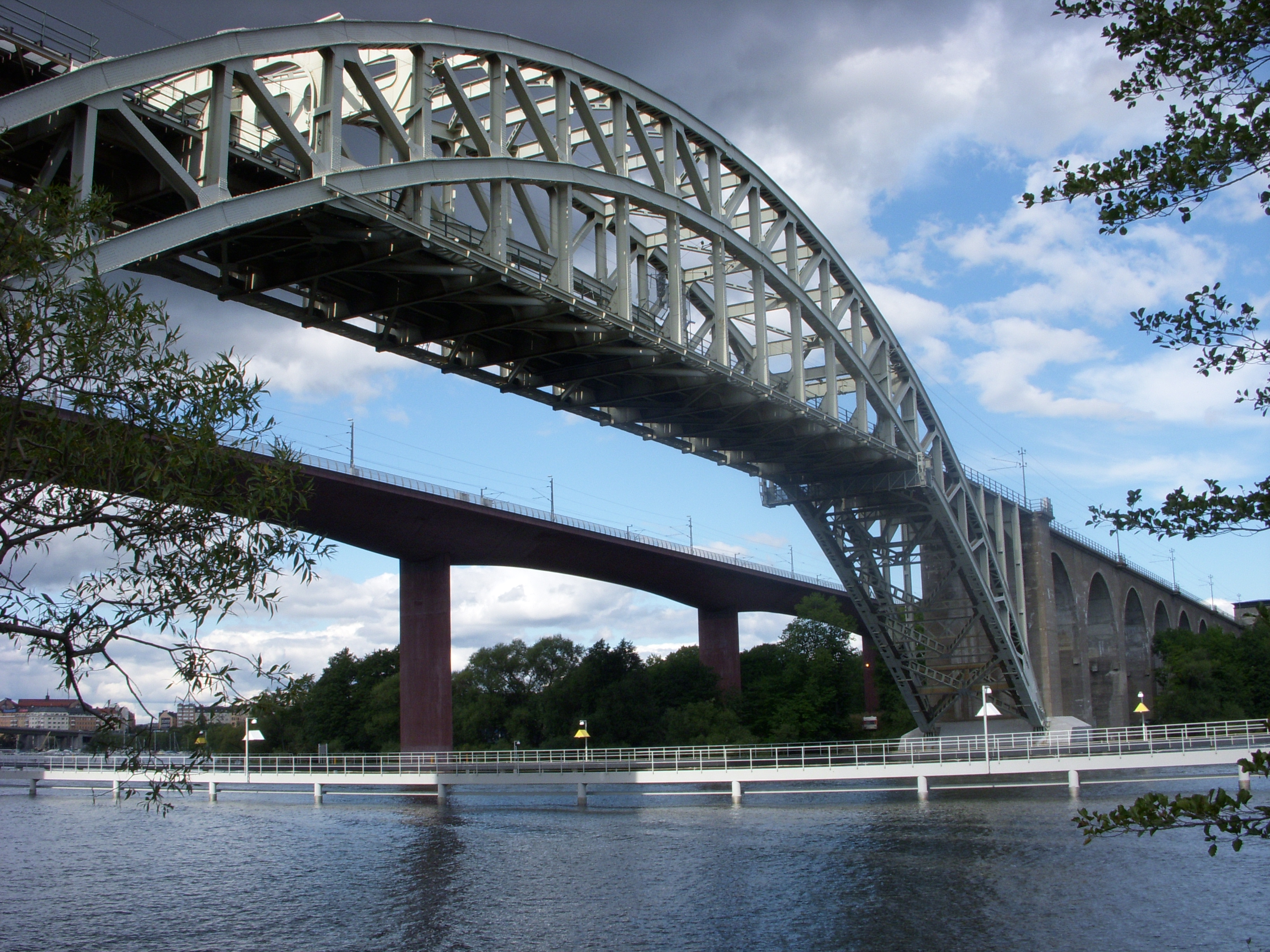
Eastern bridge 2008

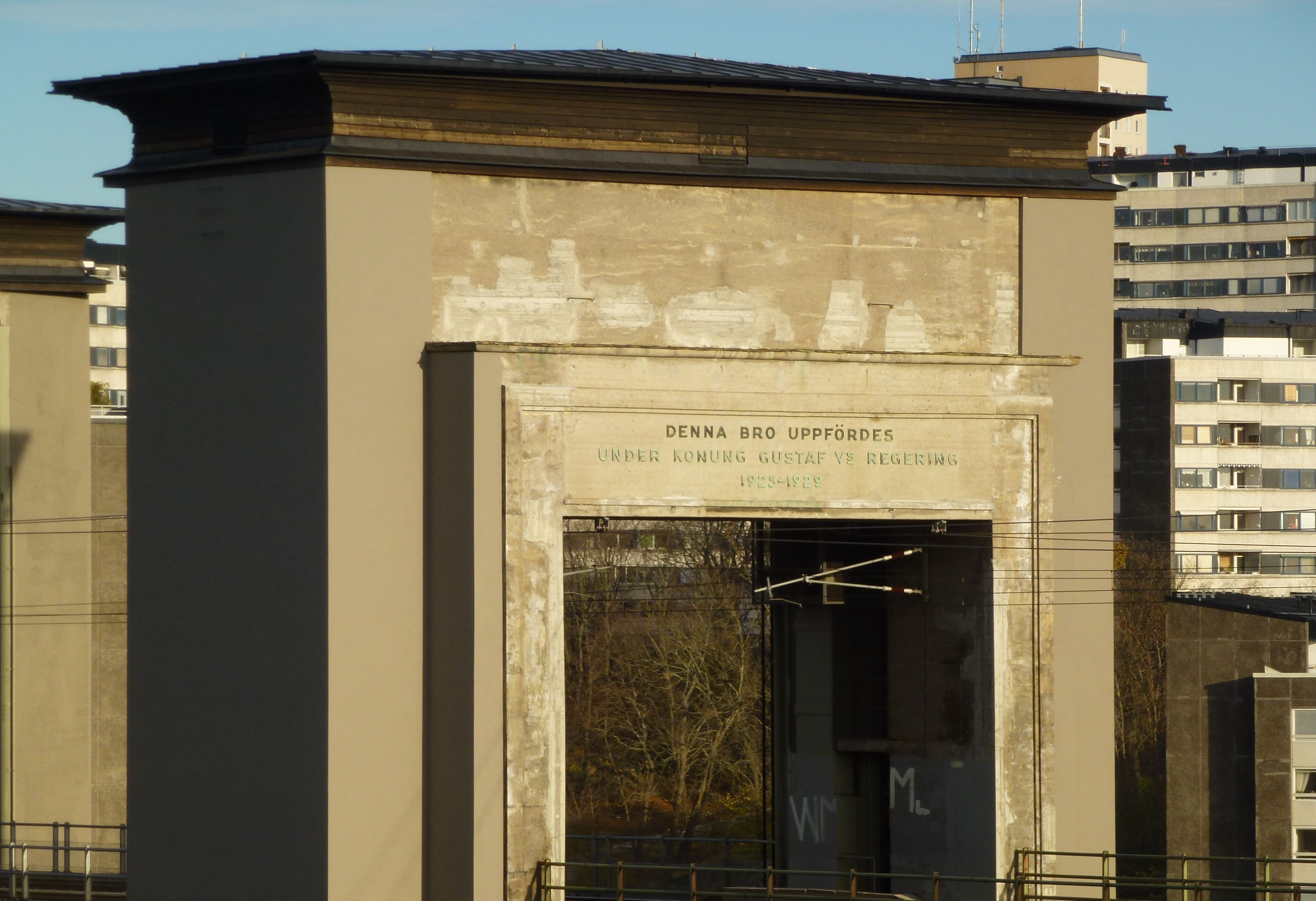
Eastern bridge tower

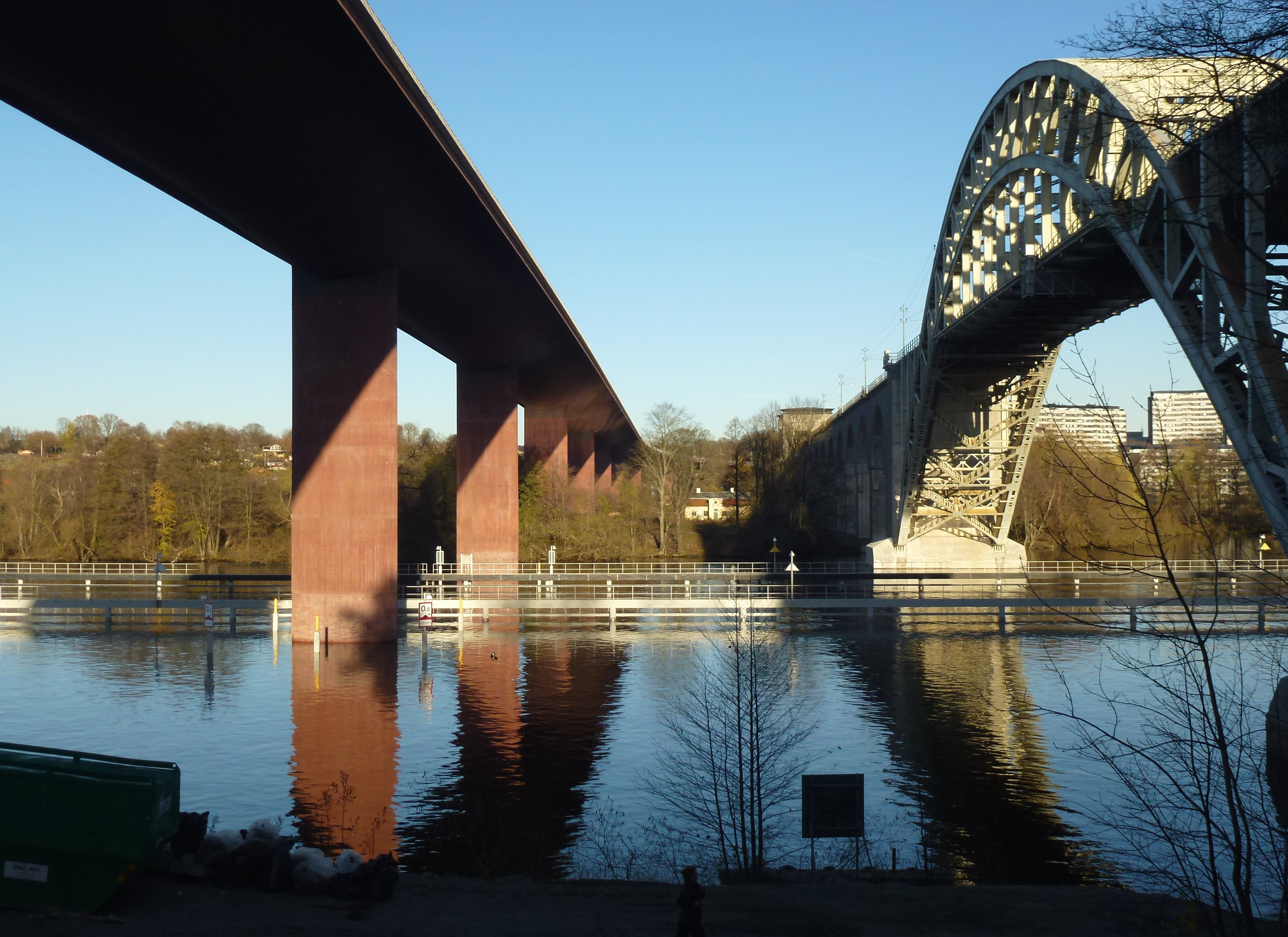
Western, eastern bridge

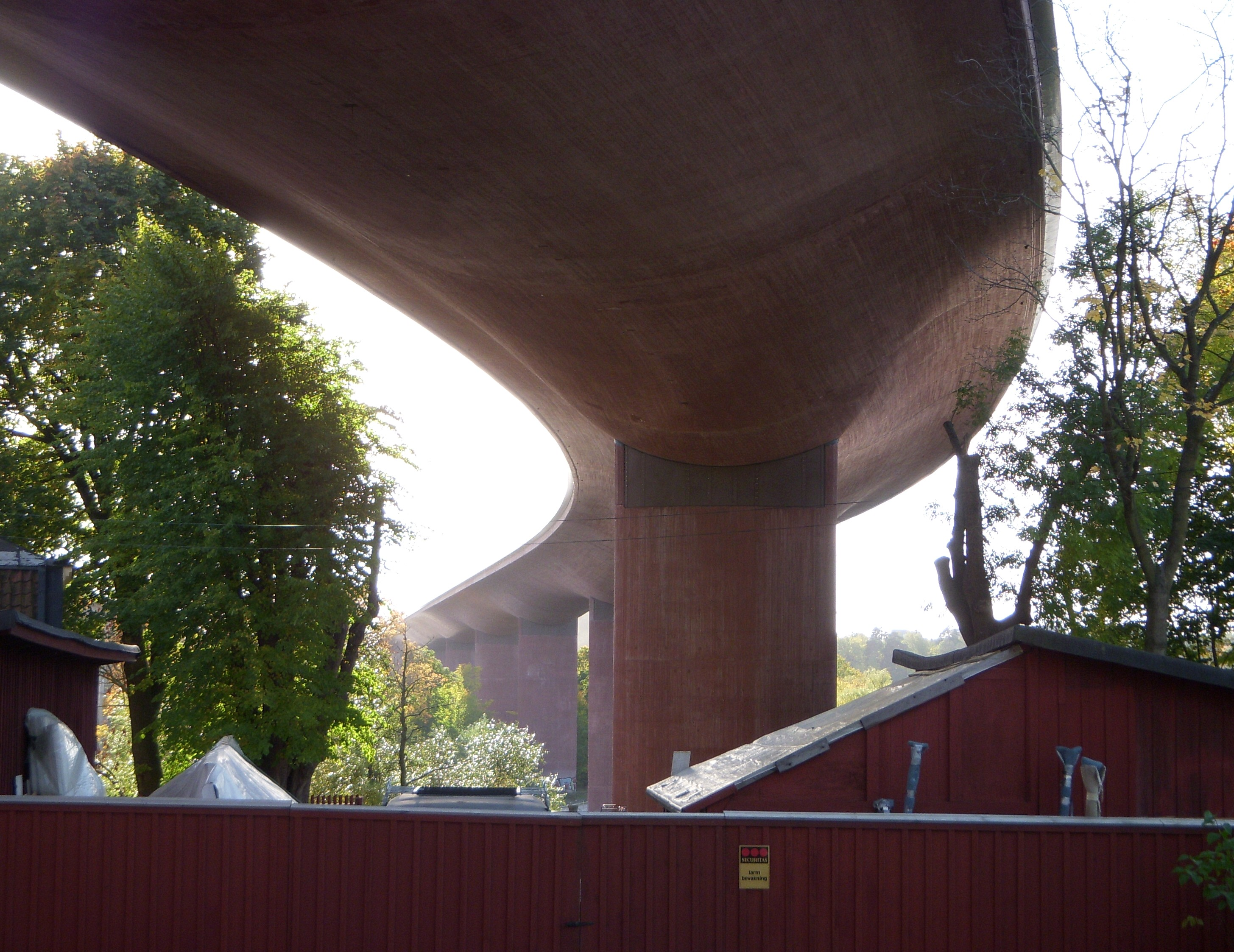
A red bridge over red buildings

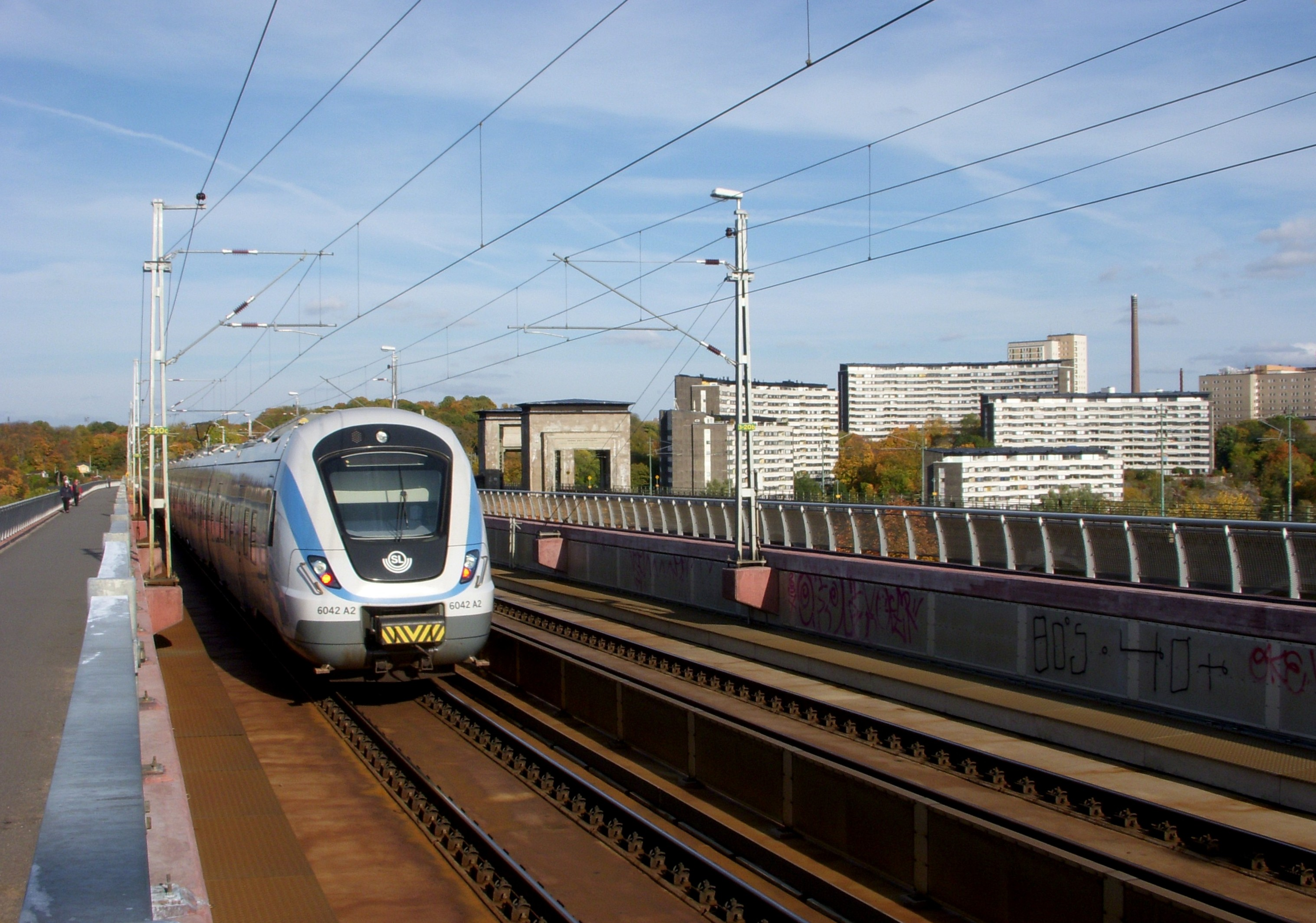
Western bridge 2008

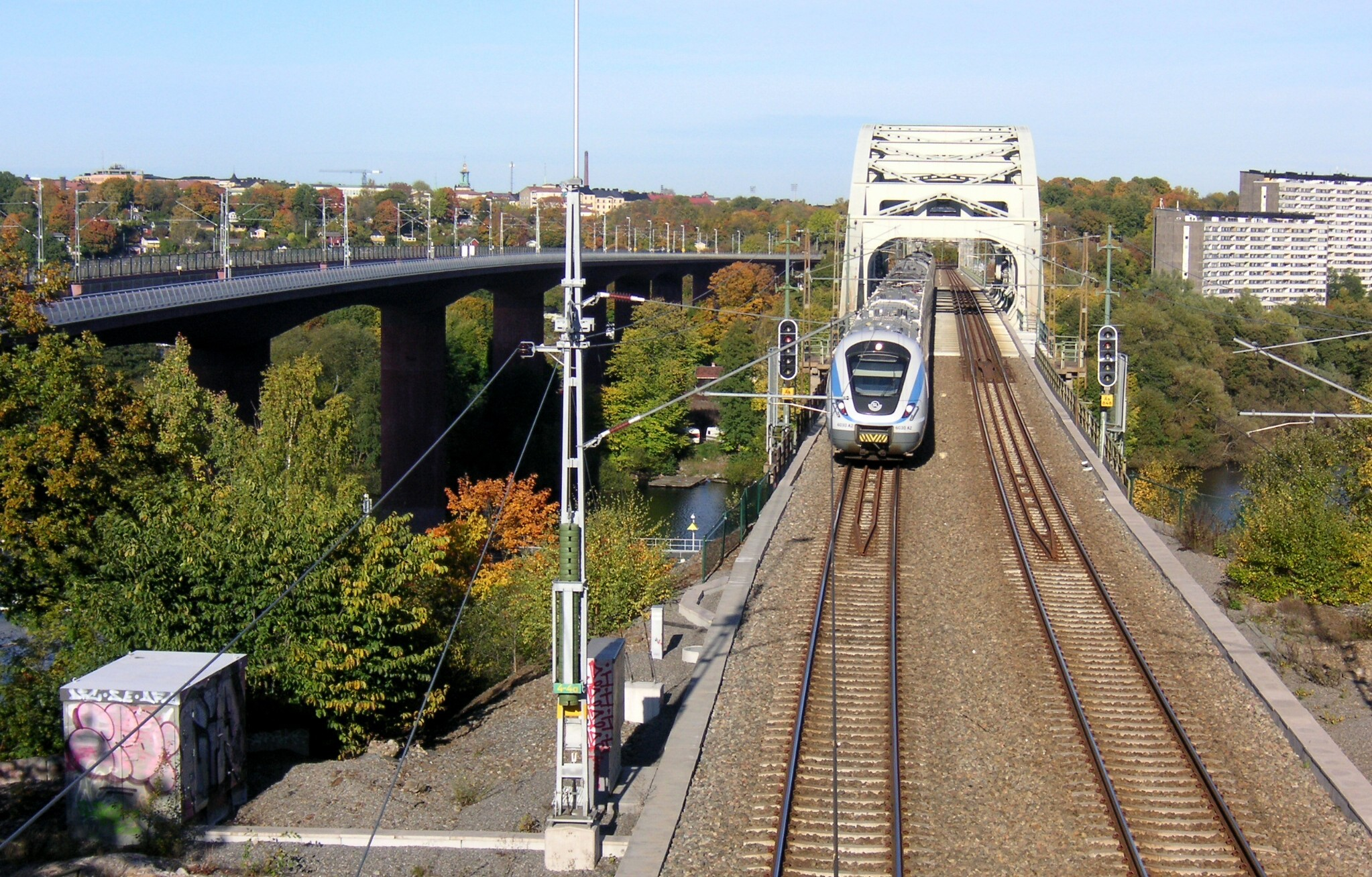
Eastern bridge 2008

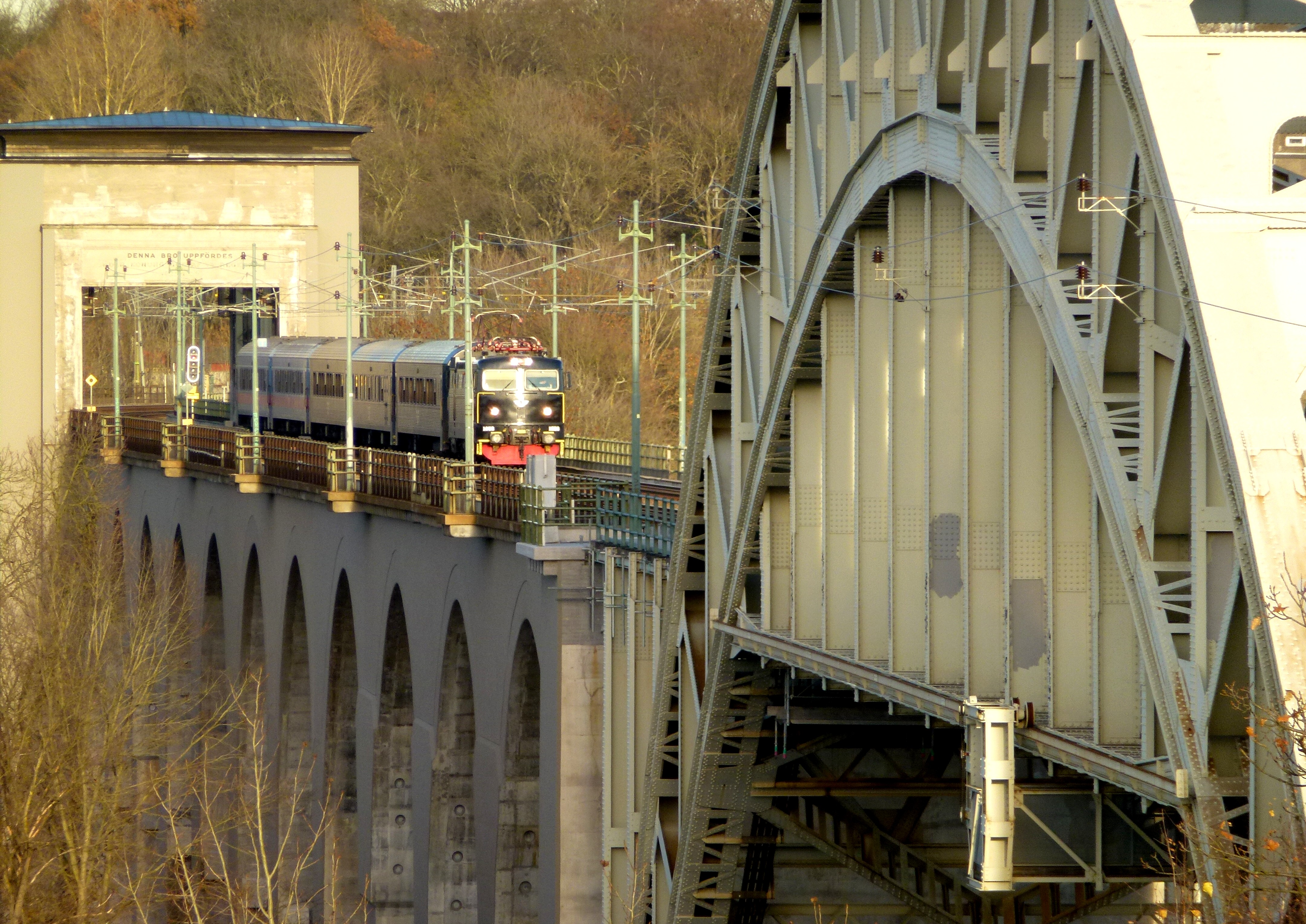
Eastern bridge 2012

== See also ==
- List of bridges in Stockholm
- Skansbron
- Skanstullsbron
- Johanneshovsbron
- Liljeholmsbron
- Tvärbanan
