= Liljeholmen =

Urban district in Stockholm, Sweden

Coordinates: 59°18′36″N 18°01′21″E

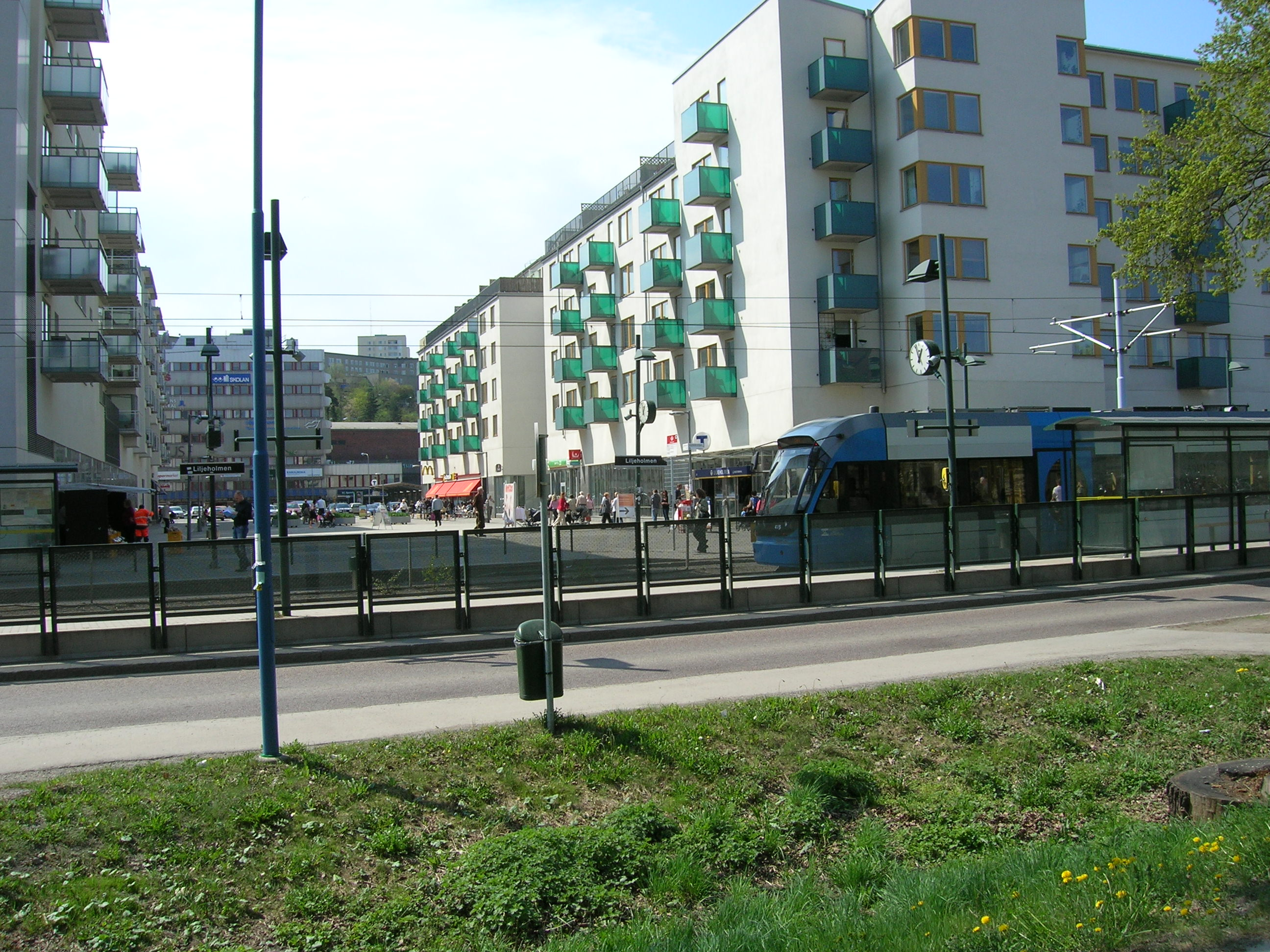
Liljeholmen

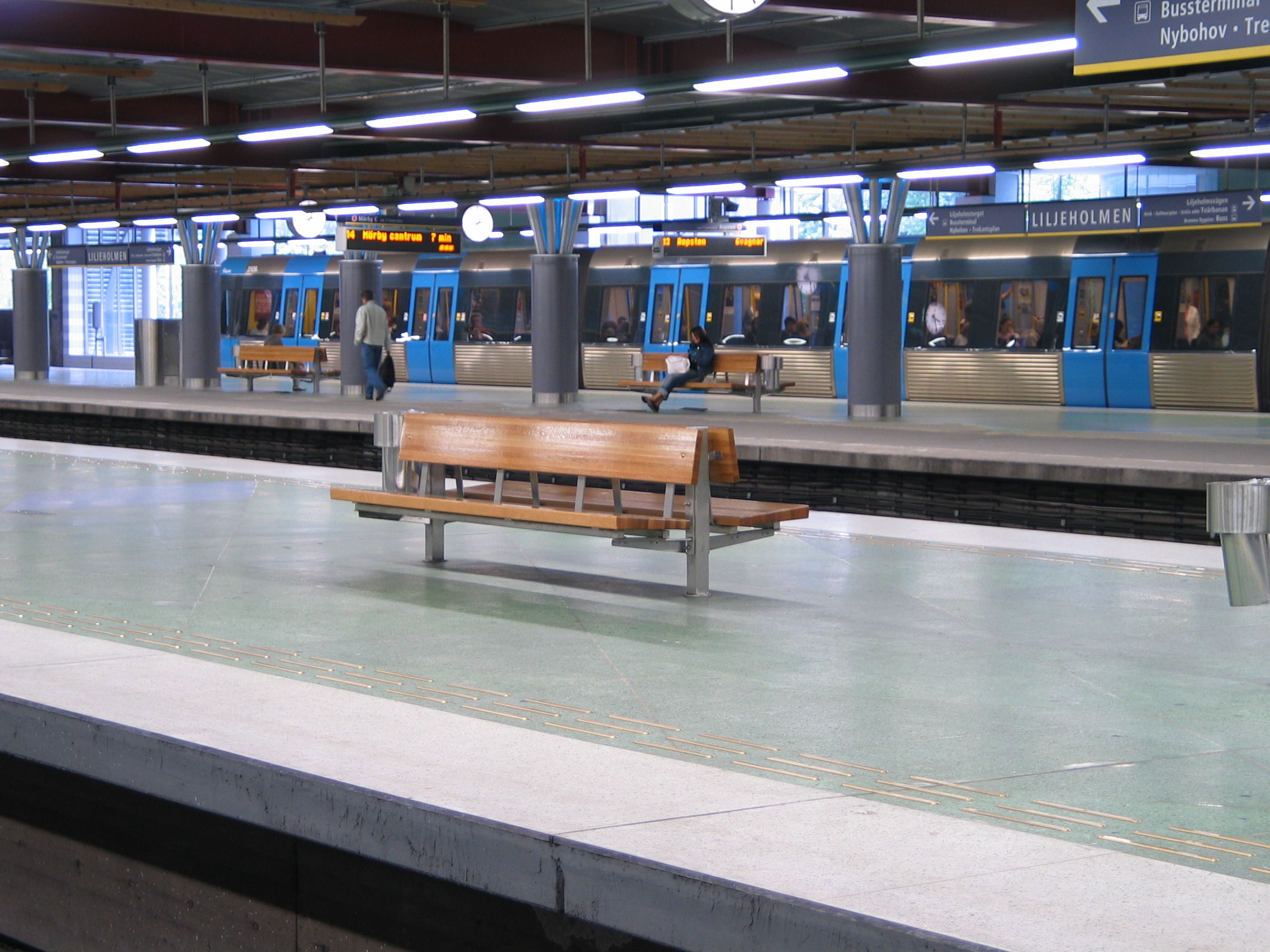
The platform of the metro station

Liljeholmen (lit. 'Lily Islet') is a district of the Hägersten-Liljeholmen borough in Söderort, the southern suburban part of Stockholm.

== History ==
In 1860, Liljeholmen became the first suburb outside Stockholm city limits. The district was then one of two self-governing villages within the Brännkyrka rural district (the other was Örby), until 1913, when it was incorporated into Stockholm. During the 1912 Summer Olympics, it hosted parts of the cycling and equestrian events.

== Economy and transportation ==
Liljeholmen contains industries and offices in Årstadal, apartments in Nybohov and Nyboda and Lake Trekanten. New residential areas are being built around the central square, former industrial areas near Årstaviken, and at Marievik as a part of several projects to enlarge the inner core of Stockholm. Metro lines 13 and 14 stop at Liljeholmen metro station and there are 3 tram stops for Tvärbanan in the district: Årstadal, Liljeholmen and Trekanten.

== Sightseeing ==
- The Fruit Park in Liljeholmen is a popular playground near Lake Trekanten where all of the equipment is shaped like fruit.
- The Nybohov Water Reservoir, located on a hill on the southwestern corner of Lake Trekanten provides a good view of the lake and surrounding area.

== See also ==
- Hornstull
- Geography of Stockholm
- Internationella kunskapsgymnasiet
