= Cantilever construction =

Method of bridge construction

Balanced cantilever construction of a prestressed concrete bridge

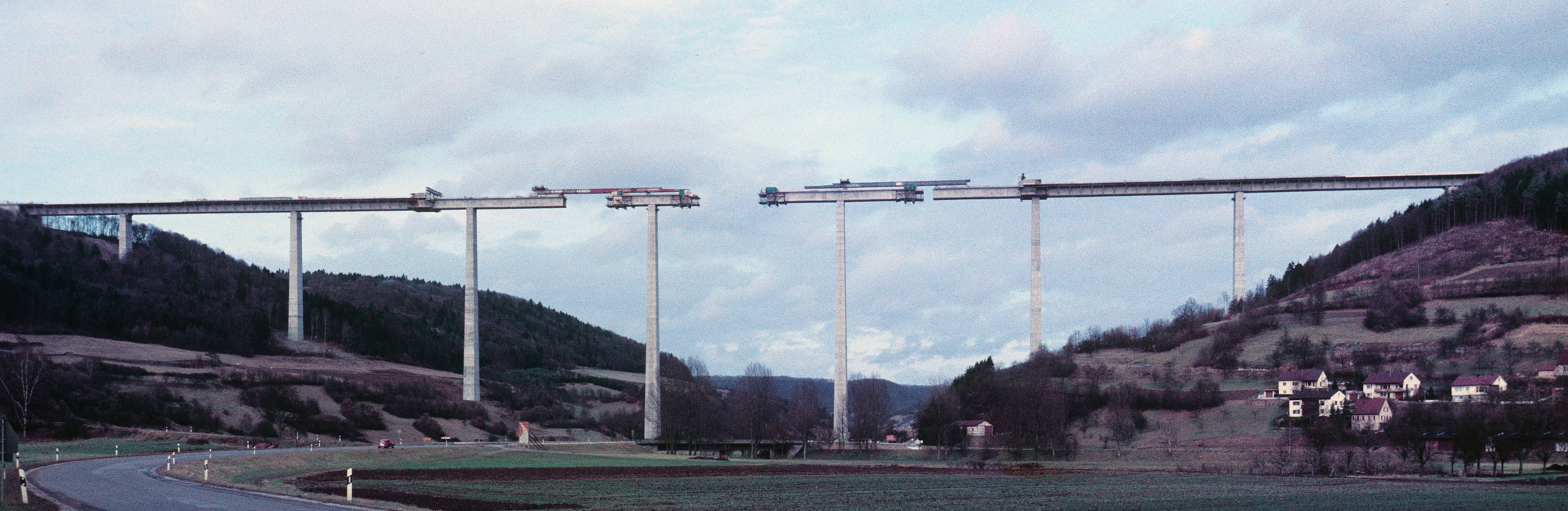
The Kocher Viaduct under construction in 1979

Cantilever construction is a method of construction in which successive sections are added to the free end of a cantilever. It is used particularly for bridges with long spans. In balanced cantilever construction, work advances on both sides of a supporting pier.

== History ==
The method was used for steel bridges before it was applied to concrete. Its first application to reinforced concrete was the central span of the Ponte Emílio Baumgart, built in 1930 over the Rio do Peixe between Herval d'Oeste and Joaçaba, in Santa Catarina (Brazil). The span was approximately 68 metres (223 ft) long. In 1951, the 62-metre (203 ft) Lahn bridge at Balduinstein, designed by Ulrich Finsterwalder, became the first bridge built by cantilevering in cast-in-place prestressed concrete.

Two years later, the same method was used for the Nibelungen Bridge at Worms, the first prestressed concrete bridge across the Rhine, with a maximum span of 114 metres (374 ft). The Stolma Bridge in Norway, completed in 1998 using balanced cantilever construction and lightweight concrete in the central part of its main span, had a span of 301 metres (988 ft). At completion, this was a world record for a segmental concrete box girder bridge.

== Construction process ==
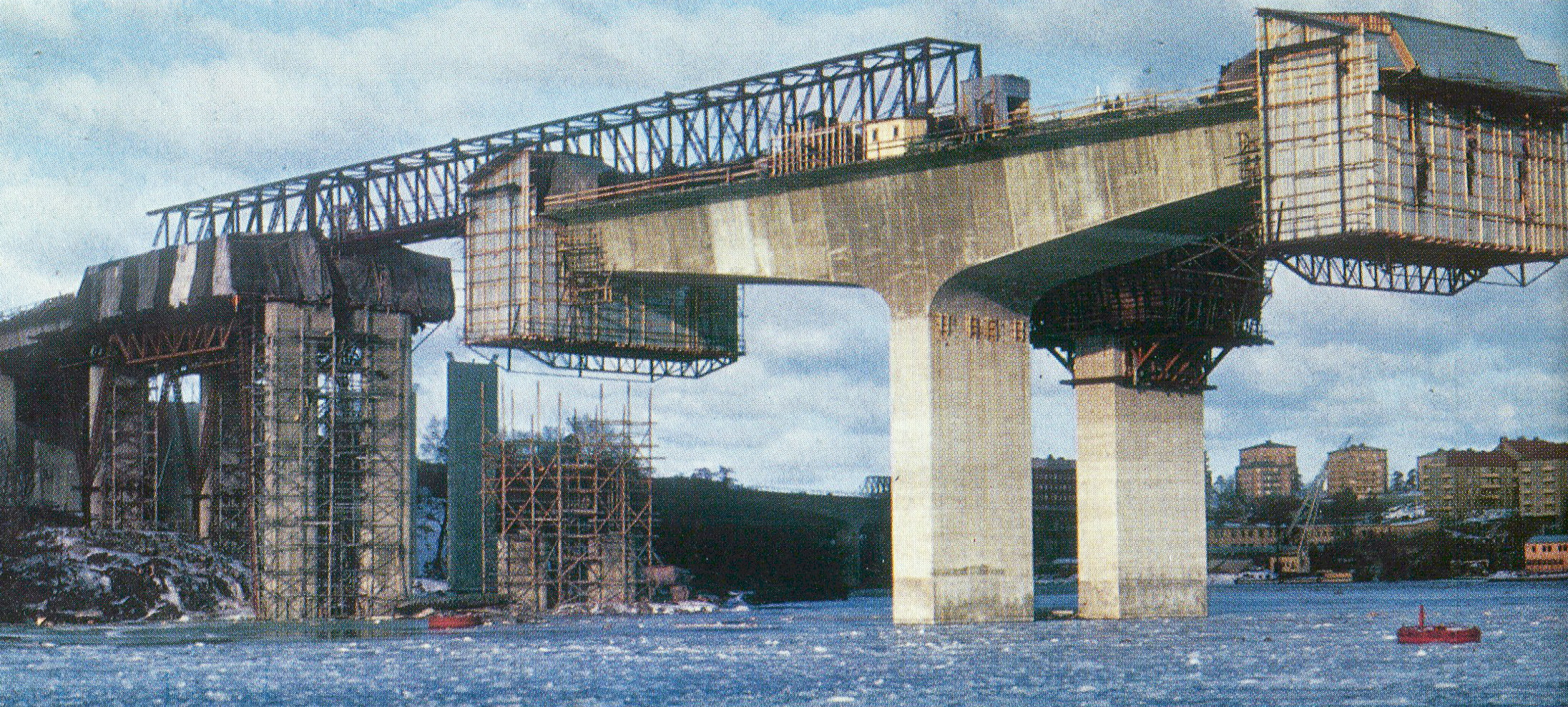
Cantilever construction of Gröndalsbron, part of the Essingeleden motorway in Stockholm, in 1965

In conventional balanced cantilever construction, the superstructure is built out symmetrically from a pier, to which it is rigidly connected during construction. The deck is generally deeper above the pier than at midspan, to resist the greater bending moments near the support.

In cast-in-place construction, a form traveller supports the projecting formwork and the weight of the new concrete. Sections, typically 3 to 5 metres (10 to 16 ft) long, are cast on each side of the pier. Once a section has gained sufficient strength and has been post-tensioned, the traveller advances to the next position. Construction continues until the cantilever reaches approximately halfway across the span. The other half is built from the adjacent pier. A closure section joins the two cantilevers to form a continuous structure; earlier bridges often had a hinge at midspan.

Auxiliary girders can also be used. At the Kocher Viaduct, an overhead steel girder carried materials to the form travellers and allowed them to be moved to the next pier. Multi-span bridges can be assembled similarly from precast concrete segments, using large movable launching gantries.

Reinforced-concrete arches can be built by cantilevering with temporary stays and towers. The decks of cable-stayed bridges are also commonly built by cantilevering, with the stays providing support as construction advances.

== Examples ==
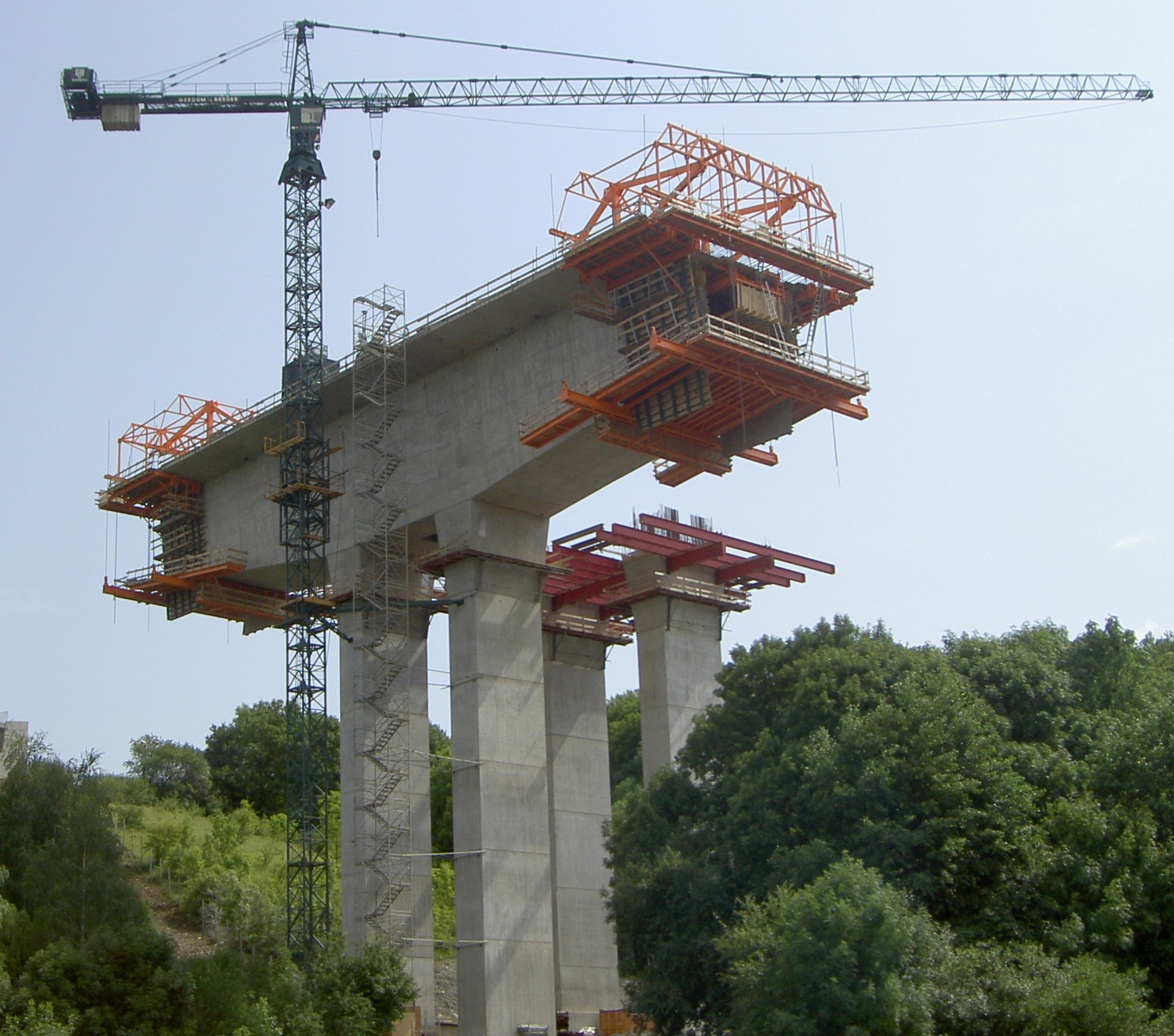
Cantilever construction of the Weida Viaduct

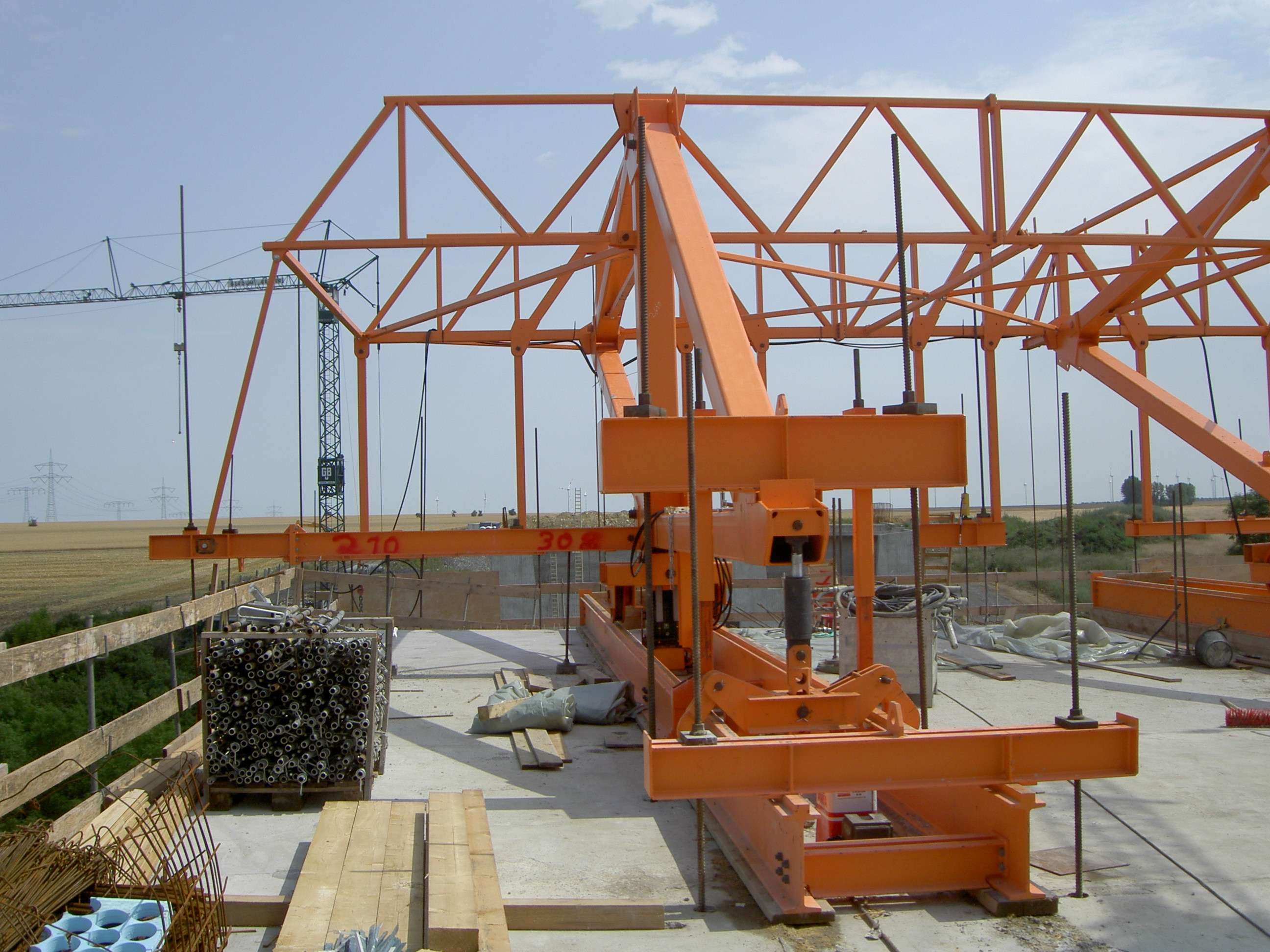
A form traveller and its rear anchorage

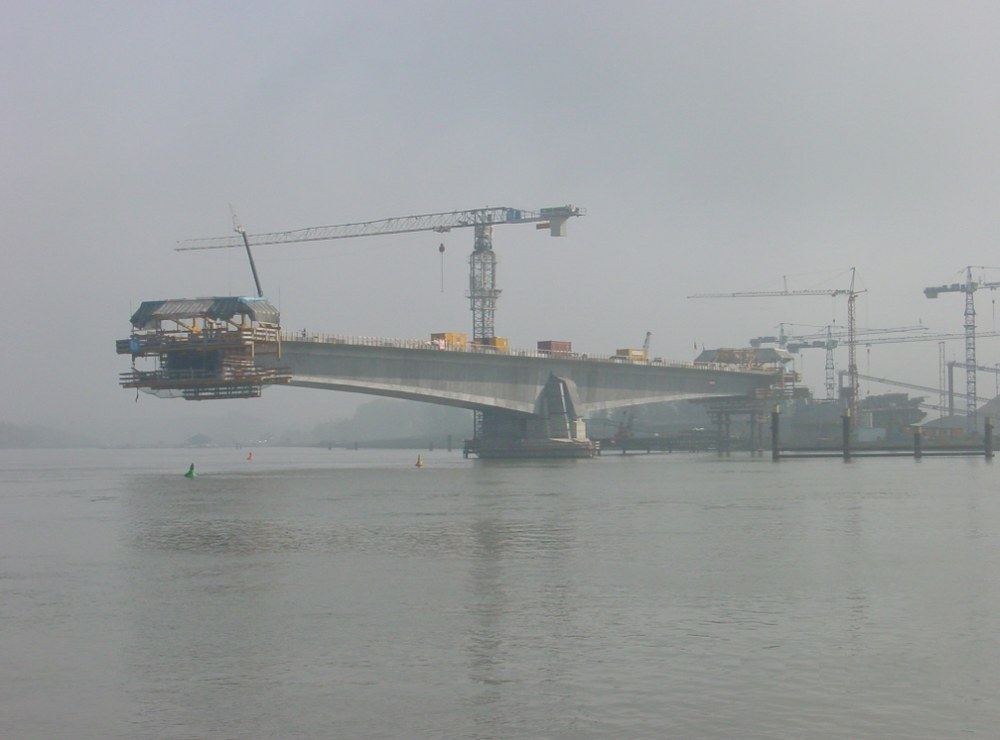
Cantilever construction of the Pierre Pflimlin Bridge

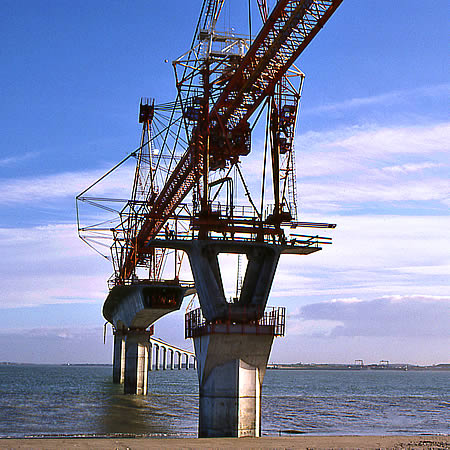
Cantilever construction with precast segments

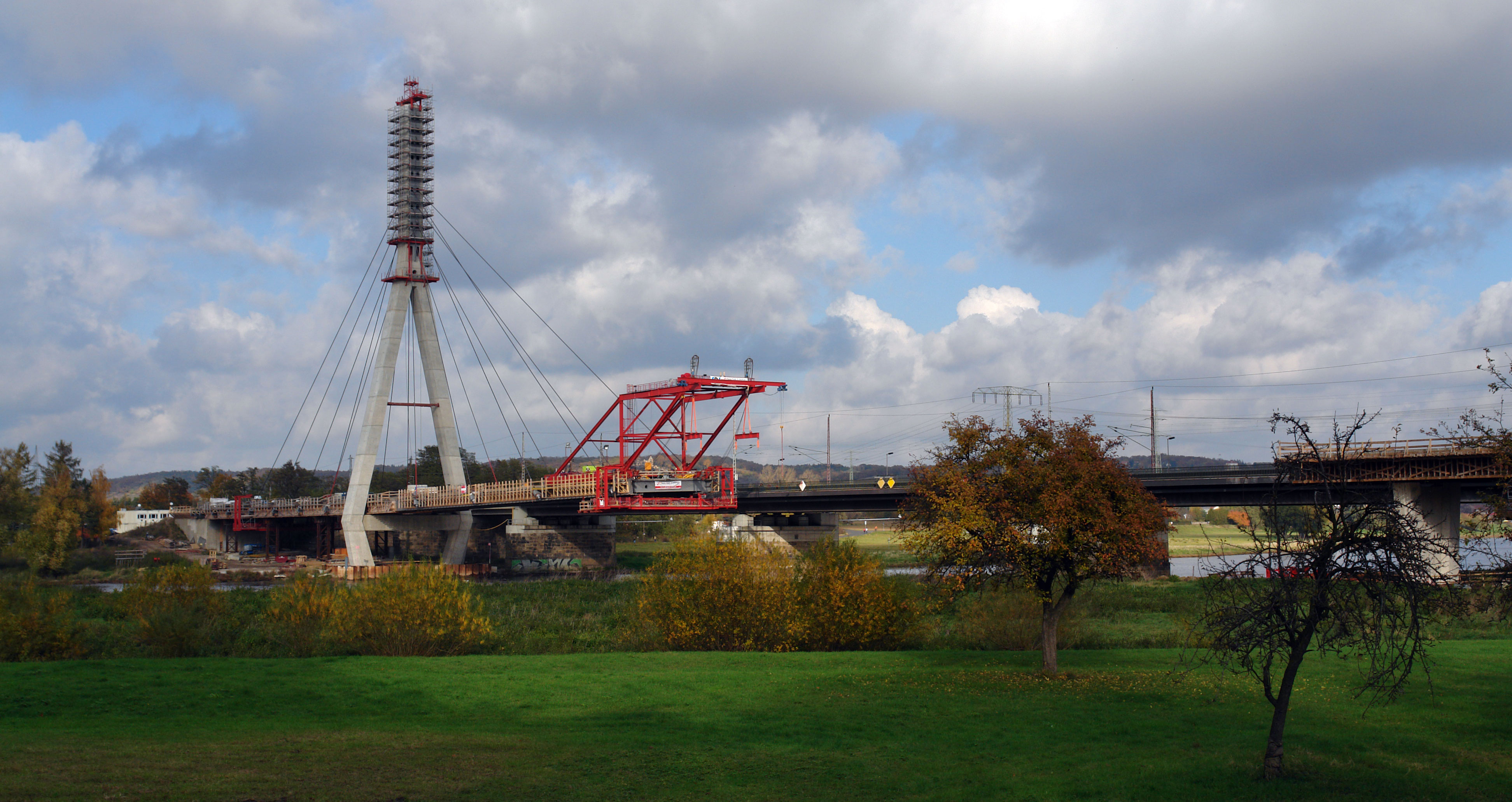
Construction of the cable-stayed road bridge at Niederwartha

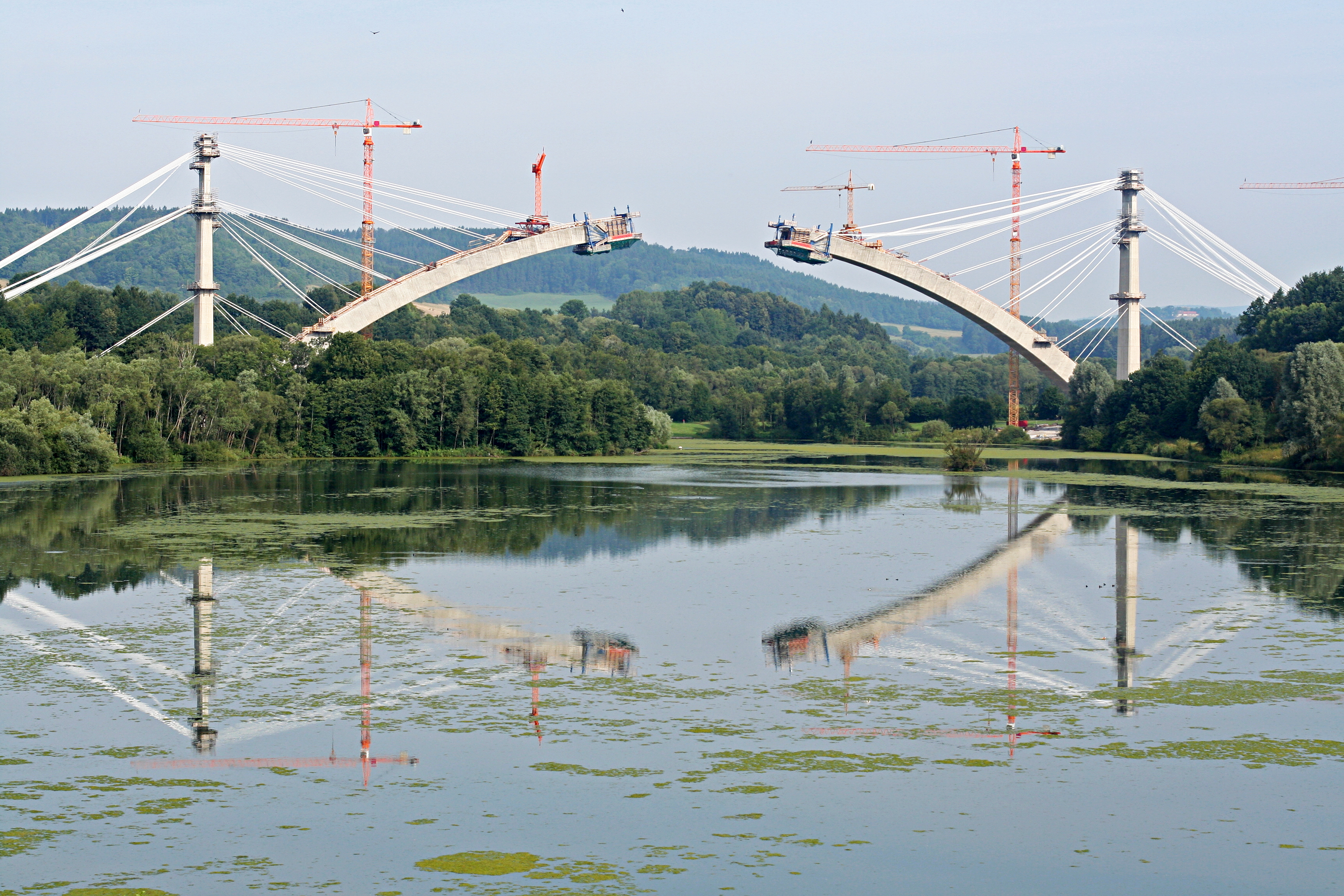
Cantilever construction of the Froschgrundsee Viaduct arch using temporary stays
