= Essingen Islands =

Group of two islands in Stockholm, Sweden

Coordinates: 59°19′22″N 17°59′45″E

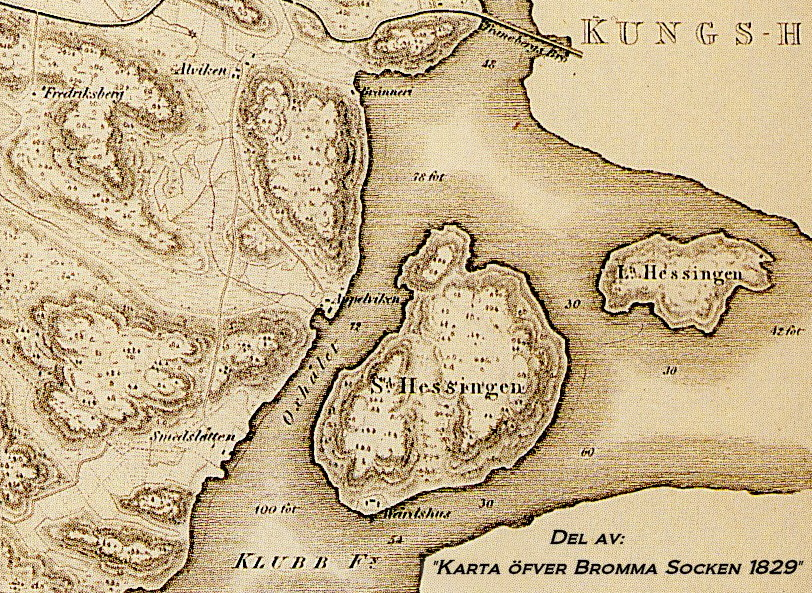
Map of Stora and Lilla Hessingen in 1829

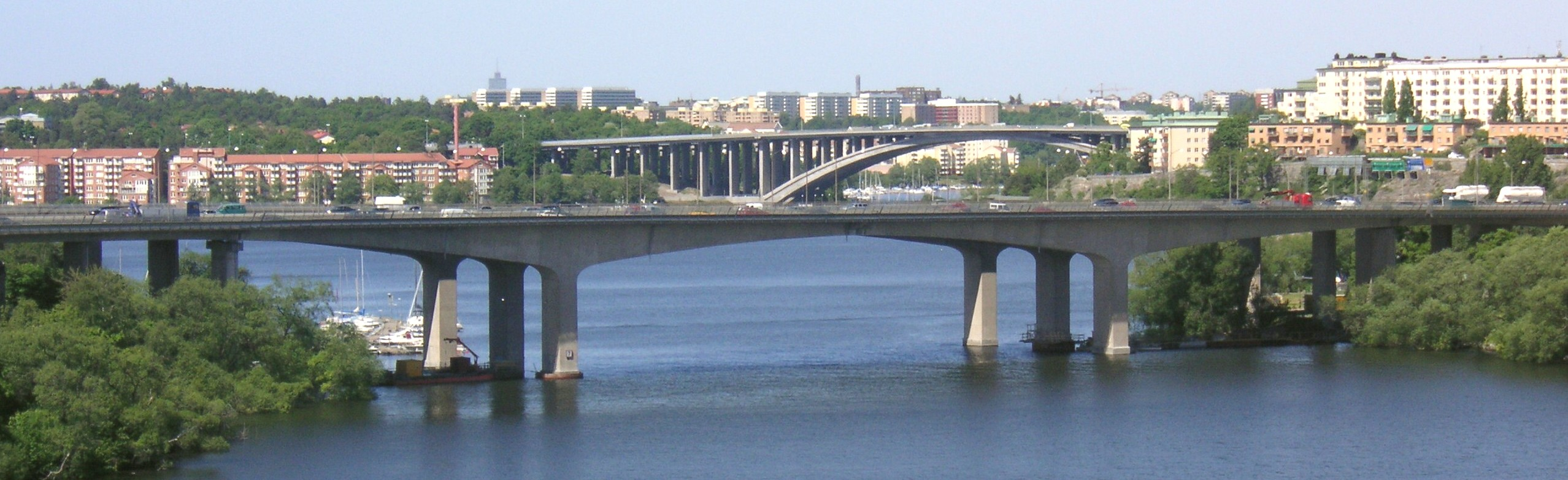
Essingebron

The Essingen Islands (Swedish: Essingeöarna) are a group of two islands—Stora Essingen and Lilla Essingen—in the Swedish lake of Mälaren, located southwest of Kungsholmen in Stockholm. Both Essingen islands are mainly residential areas, the smaller densely packed with apartment buildings while the larger is scattered with private houses and, to a lesser extent, apartment buildings.

The islands were a part of the administrative Bromma socken until 1916, when they were incorporated with the socken into the City of Stockholm. They remained a part of Bromma Parish until 1955, when they received their own parish within the Church of Sweden. On older maps, the islands are called Stora Hessingen and Lilla Hessingen.

Essingebron bridge was built between the islands and Kungsholmen in 1907, and between the islands themselves in 1917. In 1966, the Essingeleden motorway opened across the islands. The Alviksbron bridge (for pedestrians, bicycles, and trams) opened in 2000.
