= Tranebergsbron =

Double arch bridge in Stockholm, Sweden

Coordinates: 59°20′01″N 17°59′42″E

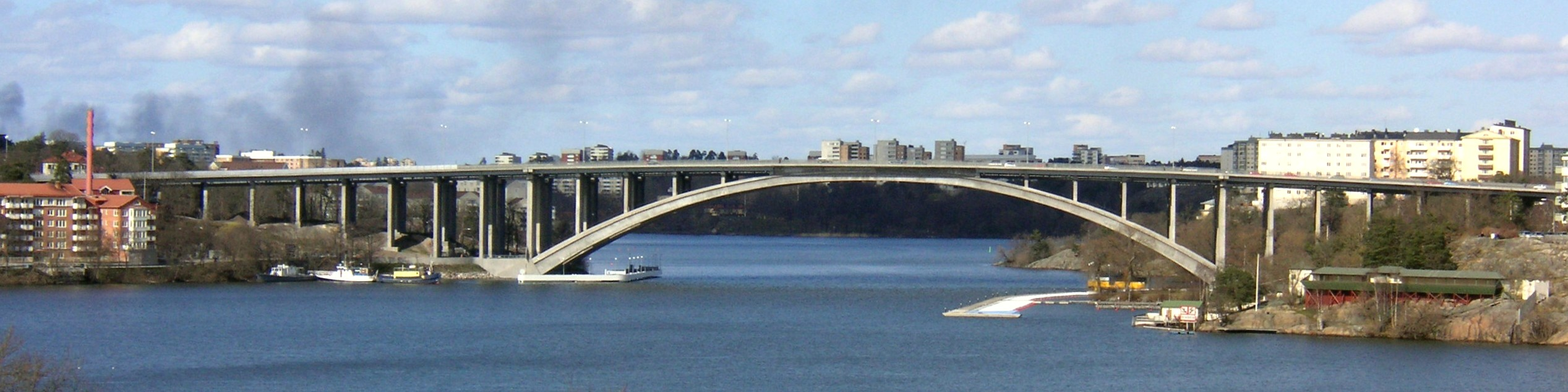
Tranebergsbron viewed from the south.

Tranebergsbron, also known as the Traneberg Bridge, is a double arch bridge located in central Stockholm, Sweden. Stretching over the strait Tranebergssund it connects the major island Kungsholmen with the western suburb Bromma. The bridge serves as a passage for both road and Metro tracks.

== History ==
Part of the ambition of King Gustav III (1746–1792) to construct a road from the city to the palace at Drottningholm Palace, the first bridge at this location was a floating bridge finished in 1787, defrayed by the funds granted the king as christening gift when he was named crown prince in 1779. As neglected maintenance made it necessary to rebuild the bridge by the 1850s, the new floating bridge was then relocated slightly southwards, thus reaching into the valley on the western shore.

As population in the Western Suburbs grew in the early 20th century, the necessity of a bridge that allowed cars, trucks, and trams became increasingly apparent, and 1911–1914 a pontoon bridge was built parallel to the old bridge. With its concrete abutments, and steel rafts and superstructure, the bridge was 227 metres in length, 6.3 metres wide, and had a 37 metres long swing span to allow the passage of ships. Soon insufficient, it was widened to 8.5 metres in 1921–22, and at the same time the old floating bridge closed for traffic.

The growth of the western suburbs continued to prosper however, and soon after a decision in the City Council in 1931 work begun on a double concrete arch bridge – for a year the largest in the world – some 100 metres north of the existent bridge. When inaugurated in 1934, the bridge was 580 metres long and 27.4 metres wide, with beam viaducts, with spans of 13 metres, flanking the main 181 metres wide double arch on both sides. A vertical clearance of 26 metres was chosen because of a planned sea port north of the bridge. The bridge was divided into one section for road traffic and one for the tramway. In the early 1950s the tramway was converted to Metro.

The design work for the 1934 bridge was credited to Swedish architect Paul Hedqvist.

By the end of the 20th century, the roadway was in such bad state the bridge had to be shut off for heavy vehicles for a long period. After a new third arch bridge had been added south of the old one and inaugurated in 2002, the two original bridges were in practice rebuilt and the entire structure officially inaugurated by Crown Princess Victoria August 31, 2005.

== See also ==
- List of bridges in Stockholm
- Västerbron
- Essingeleden
- Ekelundsbron
- Alviksbron
- Gröndalsbron
