= Essinge =

Essinge may refer to:

- Stora Essingen, Stockholm, Sweden
- Lilla Essingen, Stockholm, Sweden
