= Mariebergsbron =

The Marieberg Bridge Mariebergsbron
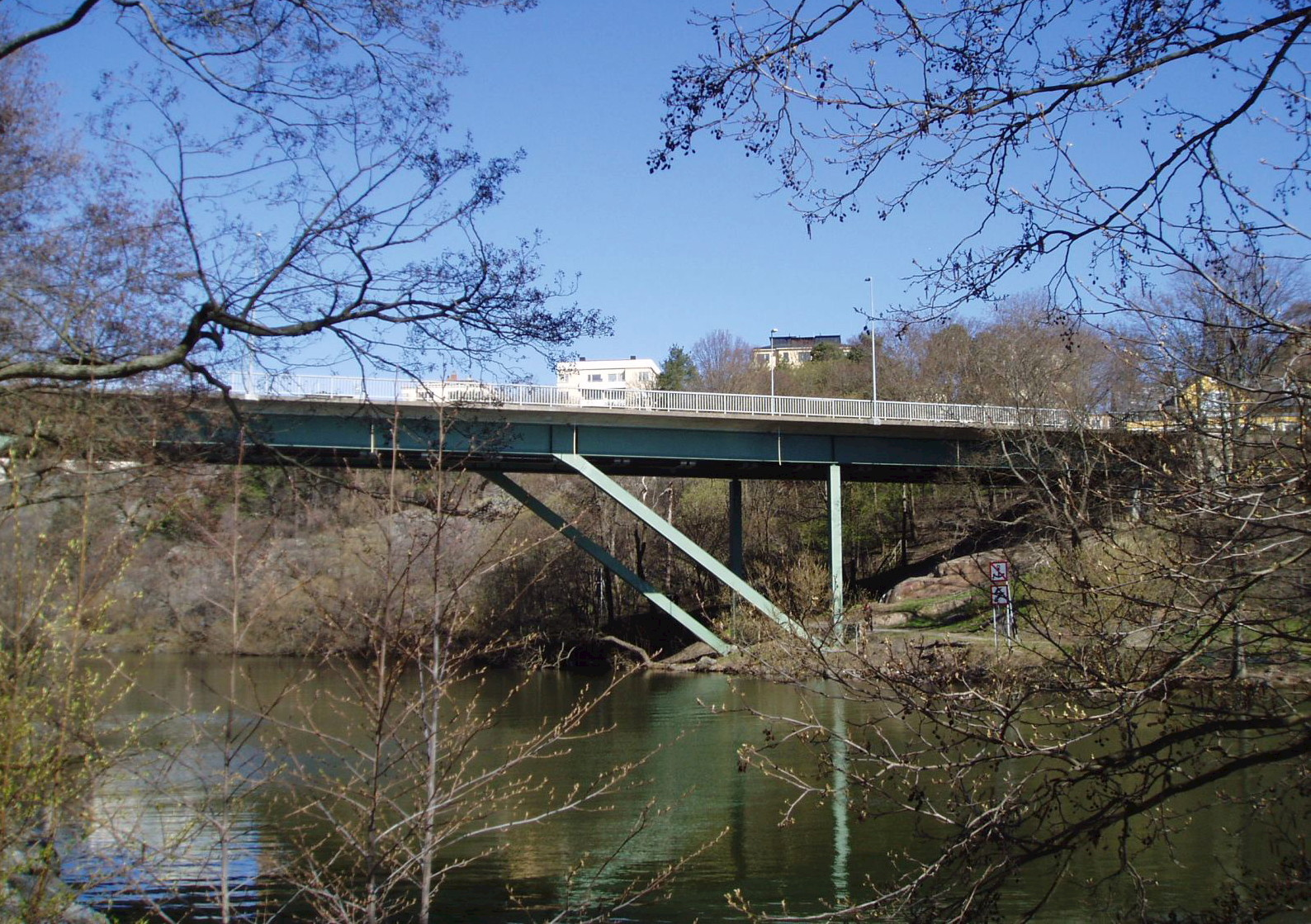
- Coordinates: 59°19′32.5″N 18°0′35″E

Characteristics
- Material: Steel
- Total length: 109 m (358 ft)
- Width: 15 m (49 ft)
- Clearance above: 12 m (39 ft)

Mariebergsbron (Swedish: "The Marieberg Bridge") is a bridge in central Stockholm, Sweden. Formerly known as Lilla Essingebron, it connects the islands Kungsholmen to Lilla Essingen. The current name is due to its vicinity to the city district Marieberg.

The first bridge at this location, replacing a hand-pulled ferry, was built in 1907 and financed by local landowners. It was a rather heavy concrete bridge with a 5 metres (16 ft) wide roadway flanked by two 0.5 metres (1.6 ft) thick edges.

The bridge was transferred over to the city in 1916, and as Lilla Essingen was being exploited in the 1930s, the bridge was replaced by the current steel bridge with trussed girders. It is 109 metres (358 ft) long; offers a horizontal clearance of 12 metres (39 ft); and is 15 metres (49 ft) wide with a roadway of 10 metres (33 ft).

== See also ==
- List of bridges in Stockholm
- Essingebron
- Fredhällsbron (part of the Essingeleden motorway)
- Gamla Essingebroväg
