= Essingebron =

Two parallel bridges in Stockholm, Sweden

Coordinates: 59°19′25″N 17°59′56″E

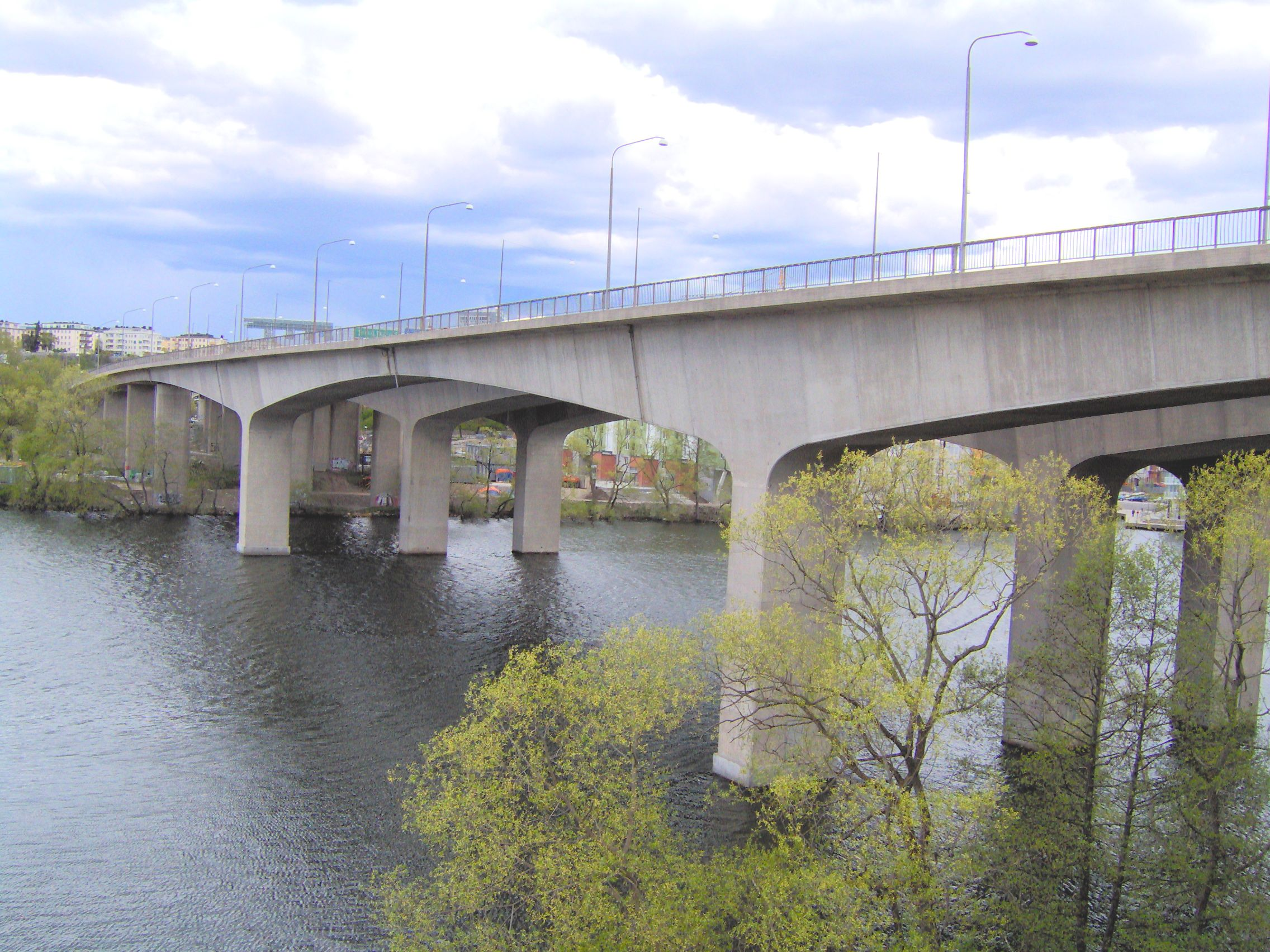
The three bridges leading from Stora Essingen to Lilla Essingen as viewed from Stora Essingen.

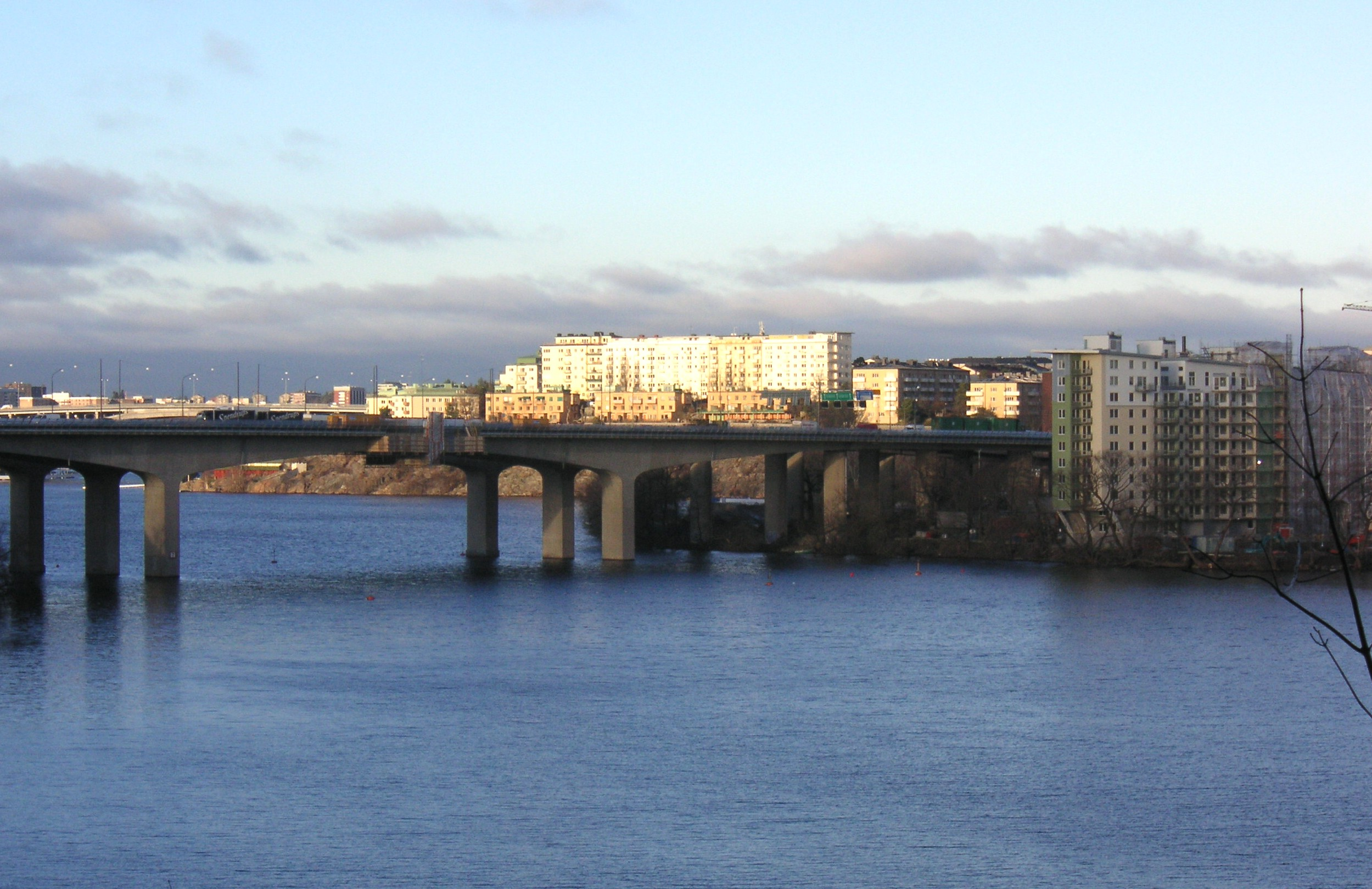
View from Gröndal.

Essingebron (Swedish: "The Essinge Bridge") are two parallel bridges in central Stockholm, Sweden, inaugurated August 21, 1966, and September 3, 1967. Forming a section of the Essingeleden motorway, they connect the two Essingen Islands (Stora Essingen and Lilla Essingen) and are the most heavily trafficked bridges in Sweden. The current bridges replaced a bridge called Stora Essingebron ("The Larger Essinge Bridge") inaugurated on May 10, 1965, as the motorway being built then resulted in a number of bridges connecting to Stora Essingen and the name was considered ambiguous. (See also Mariebergsbron). The motorway bridges are paralleled by a bridge for local use, Gamla Essinge Broväg ("Old Essinge Bridge road").

The increasing number of summer residences built on Stora Essingen during the 18th century were during the early 20th century gradually transformed into permanent residences. Therefore, a first temporary Stora Essingebron was built in 1917 using the rafts of the X-shaped pontoon bridge once in service on the ice of Lake Riddarfjärden during winters. Across the central seaway, a hand-pulled ferry connected the two pathways until replaced by a flap in 1921.

Finally in 1927 the city council decided on building a permanent bridge, inaugurated the following year. The central part of the steel construction spanned the 185 metres between the islands, using five 40 metres long spans, and was continuous on both sides with viaducts giving the entire bridge a total length of 339 metres. It was 7,6 metres wide with a 5,2 metres wide roadway, and offered an horizontal clearance of 13 metres. A severe bus accident in 1948 when a bus crashed through a railings of the bridge killing 11, led to an examination of the bridge in 1951, followed by reinforcement by draw barriers and the amelioration of the pile foundation.

In contrast to many of the other bridges in Stockholm, the route passing over the bridge was a cul-de-sac, and the bridge could therefore handle the increasing post-WW2 traffic load. However, with the construction of the Essingeleden motorway, the old bridge had to be scrapped and replaced by a new one, inaugurated in 1966. Gamla Essinge Broväg is 470 metres long; 11 metres wide with an 8 metres roadway; and offers a horizontal clearance of 16 metres between the major 100 metres wide span.

On October 14, 2005, the pontoon crane 'Lodbrok' collided with the bridge, causing a major traffic jam.

== See also ==
- List of bridges in Stockholm
- Mariebergsbron
- Fredhällsbron (part of the Essingeleden motorway)
- Gröndalsbron (part of the Essingeleden motorway)
