= Kristineberg Palace =

Coordinates: 59°20′02″N 18°00′20″E

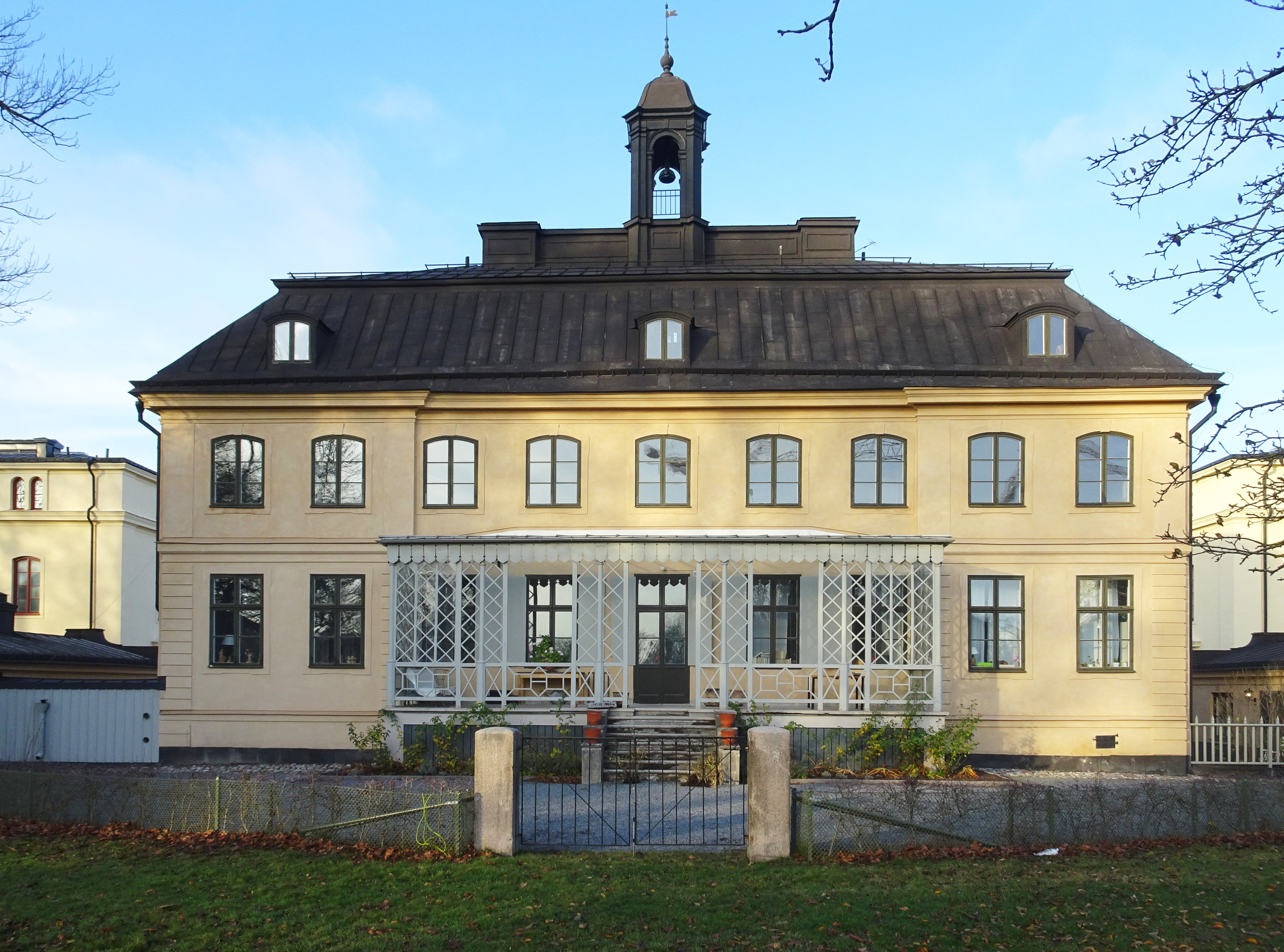
Kristineberg Palace

Kristineberg Palace (Swedish: Kristinebergs Slott) is located in Kristineberg district of Kungsholmen in Stockholm, Sweden.

== History ==
Kristineberg was built around 1750 for merchant Roland Schröder (1713–1773). The palace was surrounded by parks and the property included a great deal of the surrounding land. In 1864 the property was bought by the Swedish Freemasonry and additional construction was carried out on the palace. Stockholm City bought the land in 1921 and started building the Kristineberg district. Today part of the former palace is used as the site of Kristinebergsskolan primary school.
