= Saint Göran Hospital =

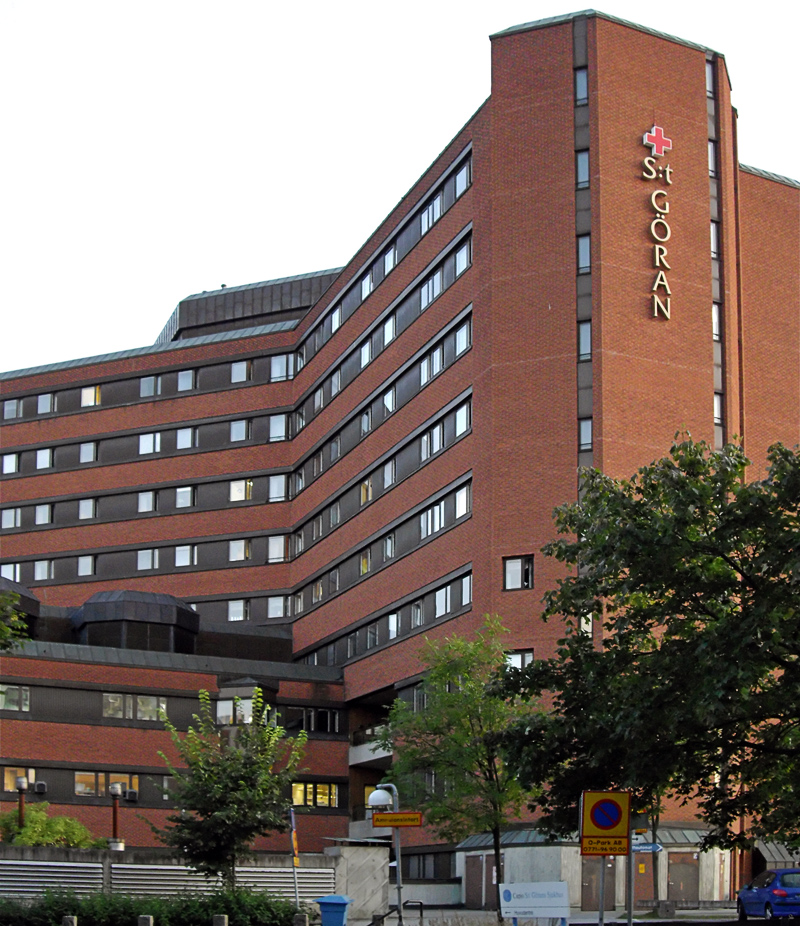
- Main building

Geography
- Location: Stockholm County, Sweden
- Coordinates: 59°20′03″N 18°01′16″E

Organisation
- Care system: Private
- Type: District General
- Patron: Saint George

Services
- Emergency department: Yes
- Beds: 300

History
- Founded: 1888

Links
- Lists: Hospitals in Sweden

Saint Göran Hospital (Swedish: Sankt Görans sjukhus) is a private hospital in Stockholm, Sweden. It is located on Kungsholmen, a small island in the lake Mälaren in the city center.

St. Göran is one of Sweden's oldest hospitals. It was mentioned in letters from the 13th century. With Karolinska Hospital (Karolinska sjukhuset) it is Stockholms's main hospital and a primary trauma center.

Its name refers to Saint George (Sankt Göran in Swedish).

In 1998 the Children's Clinic moved to Astrid Lindgren Children's Hospital, and that part of the building was converted into offices for Electrolux's head office.

In 2024 the hospital was featured in a 10 episode long documentary series which follows the daily work of its staff.

== Staff ==
Approximately 1,500 people work at the hospital, including 220 doctors, 560 nurses, and 350 assistant nurses.

== Notable staff ==
- Dr. Ivan Osiier, Danish épée, foil, and sabre fencer, Olympic silver (épée), 25-time Danish champion

== History ==
The hospital was incorporated in 1994 and became Sweden's first privately owned emergency hospital in 1999.
