= Lilla Essingen =

Island in central Stockholm, Sweden

Coordinates: 59°19′30″N 18°00′15″E

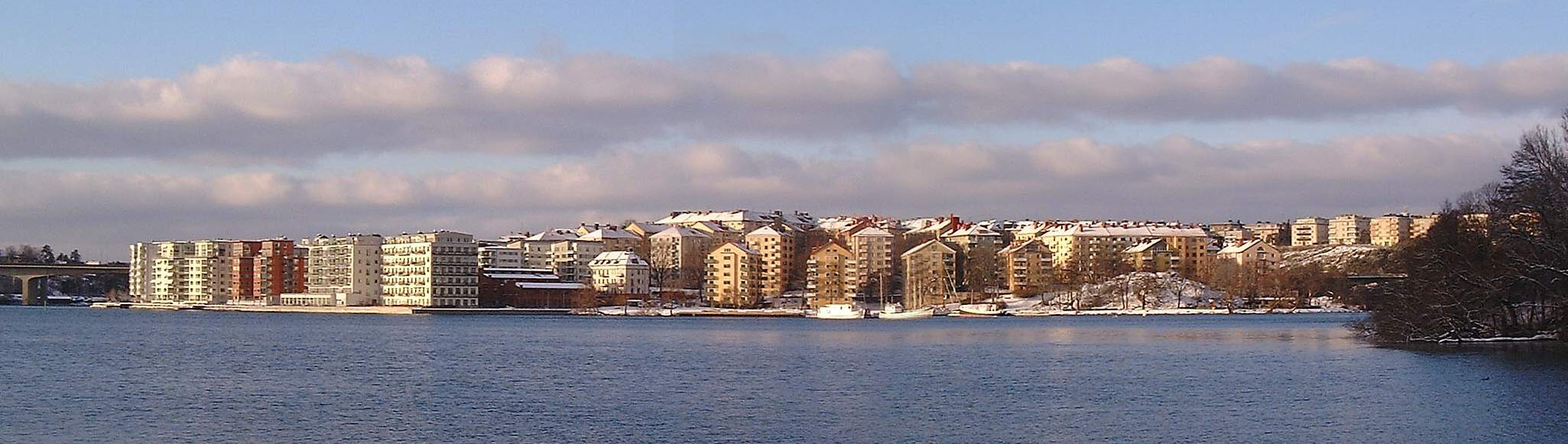
Lilla Essingen as viewed from Reimersholme in February 2007.

Lilla Essingen is a small island in central Stockholm, Sweden.

It is on Lake Mälaren next to the larger neighbouring island of Stora Essingen. Both Essingen Islands (Essingeöarna) are mainly residential areas, the smaller densely packed with apartment buildings while the larger is scattered with private houses and, to a lesser extent, apartment buildings. The Essingeleden motorway, part of the European routes E4 and E20, passing over both islands is named after them.

Bus route 1 (Stora Essingen - Frihamnen) stops at two places on Lilla Essingen, providing transport to central parts of town and connections to the underground network. Bus route 56 stops at four places, connecting the Essinge islands with Fridhemsplan and Hornsberg.

Bridges of Lilla Essingen:

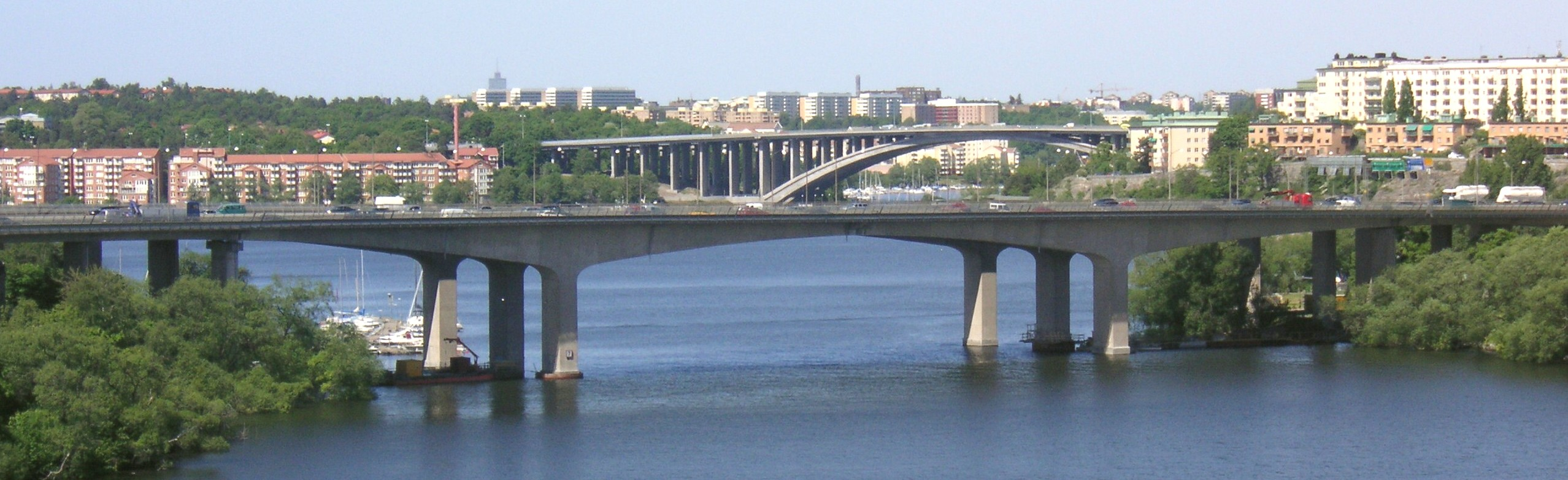
Essingebron

- From Kungsholmen:
  - Mariebergsbron
  - Fredhällsbron (part of the Essingeleden motorway.)
- From Stora Essingen
  - Essingebron (two bridges, one part of Essingeleden.)

== History ==
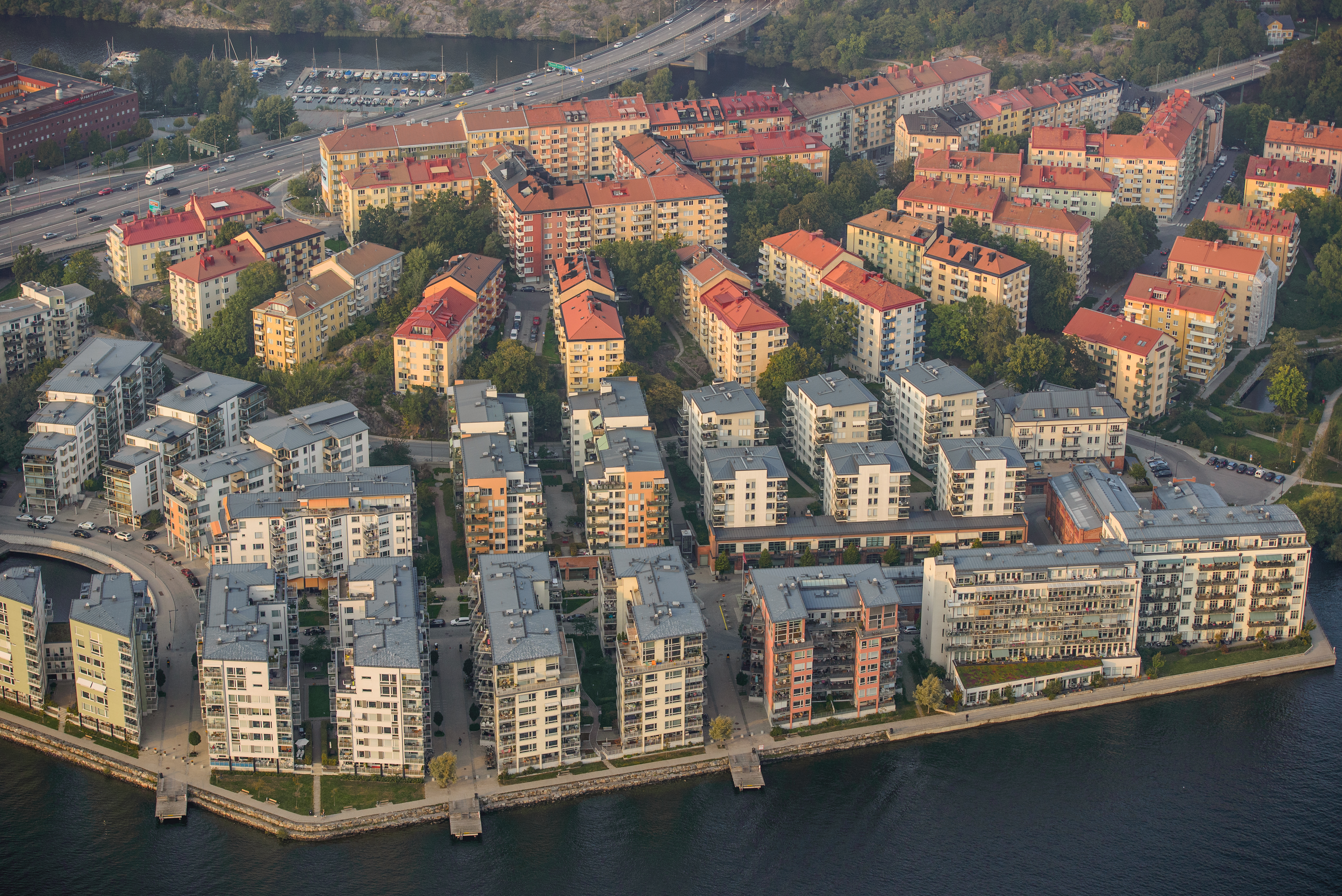
Lilla Essingen. September 2014

Lilla Essingen lies at the edge of what is generally considered central Stockholm, wedged in between Kungsholmen and the outer suburbs. Most of the island was initially an industrial area; at the time, most industrial transport was waterbound and thus the coastal plots were usually rimmed with industries. In 1908, the manufacturing facilities of Lux, a company manufacturing lamps for lighthouses, were moved to Lilla Essingen. The initial complex was composed of a workshop and an office building, the latter still present at the edge of the newly built flats. In 1912, the manufacturing was extended to include vacuum cleaners thanks to a contract with Axel Wenner-Gren. In 1919, the company was merged with AB Elektro-Mekaniska, creating today's Electrolux.

The facilities built on Lilla Essingen kept growing, and when the main workshop was destroyed by fire in 1936, the renovation included much expansion. Much ground was filled up on the edge of the water to allow for more construction. Much of Electroluxs main production facilities in Sweden was composed of the factory on Lilla Essingen. Almost the entire complex dating from the late 1930s was built in the by then modern architecture composed of much red brick. A few of those facades are still present, incorporated in the modern architecture of today.

In the 1990s, Electrolux stirred quite a bit of a debate when it filed a request to rebuild many its industrial areas. Considering the immense changes in mechanics and industry since the 1940s, the workshops were obviously outdated. The Stockholm City Museum, however, had a special interest in the facilities on Lilla Essingen and required certain insight into the renovation of the area. At this point, Electrolux decided to completely remove its operations on the island and the facilities were bought by the estate development company JM, with the intent to construct apartment blocks.
