= Gröndalsbron =

Two bridges in central Stockholm, Sweden

Coordinates: 59°19′6″N 17°59′55″E

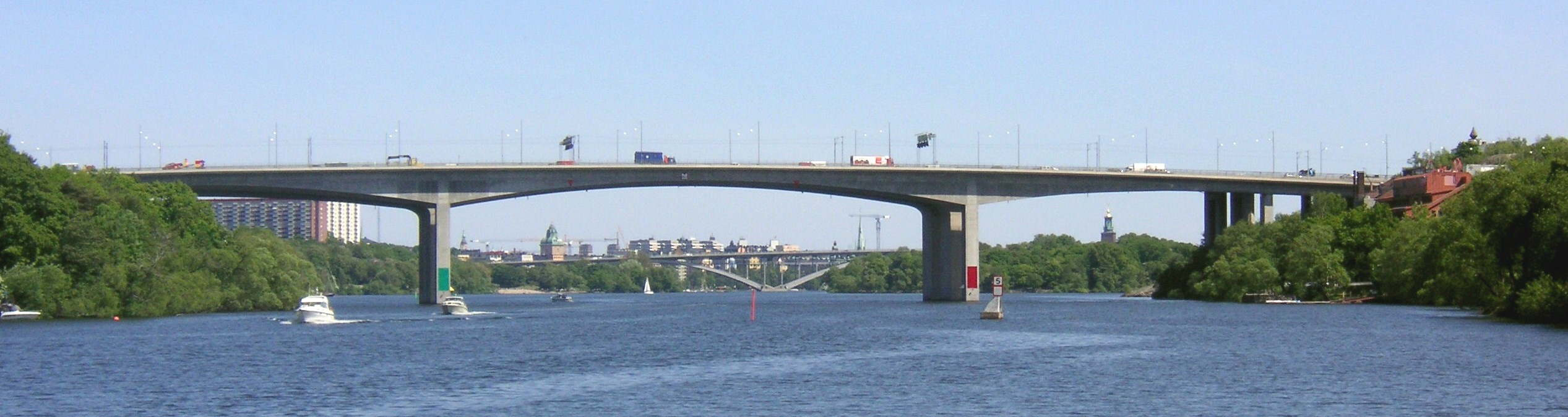

Gröndalsbron (Swedish: The Gröndal bridge) are two bridges in central Stockholm, Sweden, connecting the island Stora Essingen to the southern mainland district Gröndal.

The older bridge, inaugurated in 1967, forms a 460-metre section of the Essingeleden motorway, of which 260 metres constitute the bridge, divided into three pre-stressed concrete frames, 70, 120, and 70 metres in length. Due to several ramps connecting to the bridge the width varies from 38 to 45 metres, while the horizontal clearance is 26 metres throughout the entire structure.

The second bridge, inaugurated in 2000, forms part of the Tvärbanan light rail line and is a 120 metres long pre-stressed concrete box girder bridge. After its inauguration, slip cracks have been discovered in the bridge, a discovery which was covered up for at least a year and the following revelation in media became a main local news event for some time. The bridge has since been reinforced and is still in operation.

== See also ==
- List of bridges in Stockholm
- Essingebron
- Fredhällsbron
- Alviksbron
