= Stora Essingen =

Island in Sweden

Coordinates: 59°19′16″N 17°59′20″E

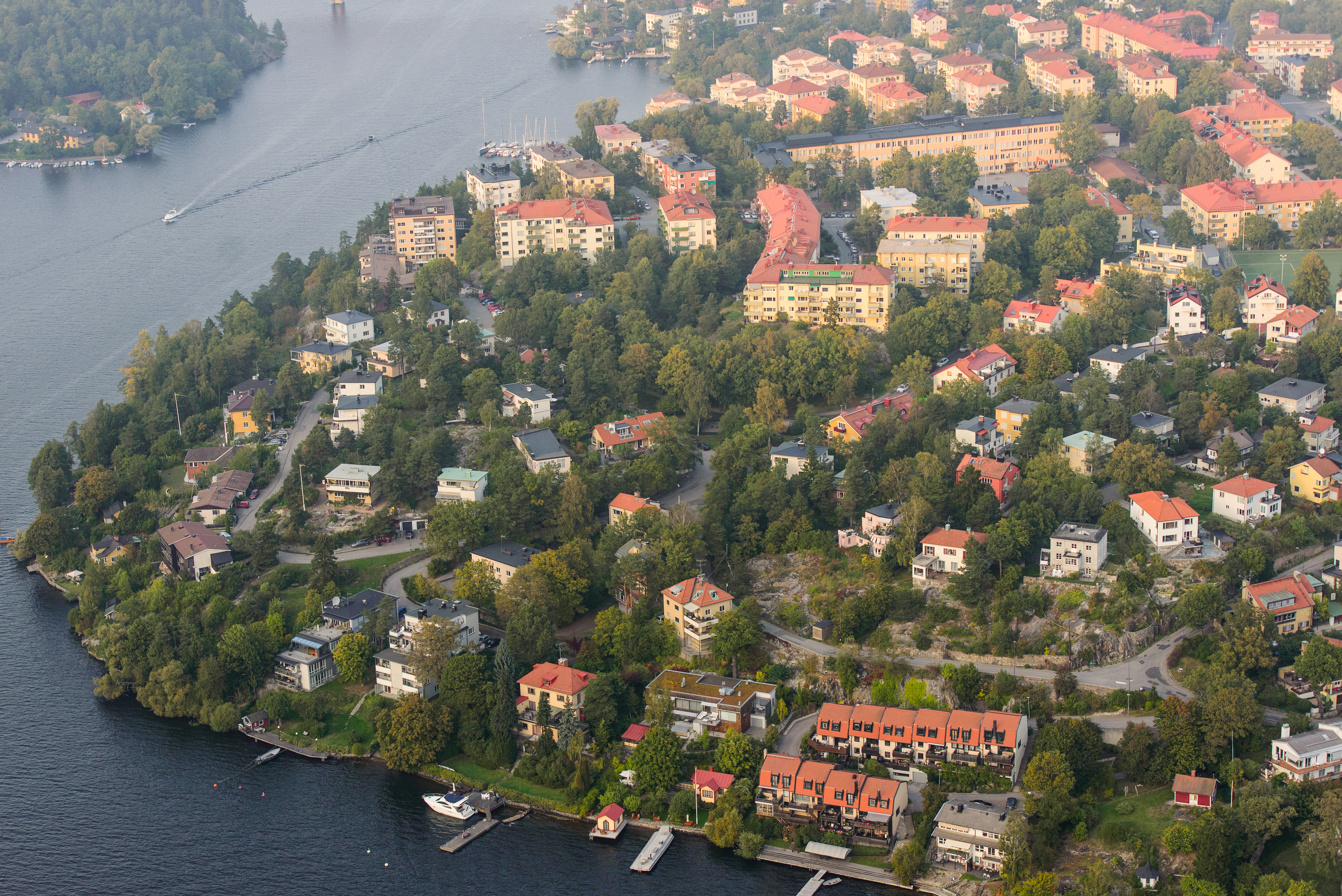
Stora Essingen

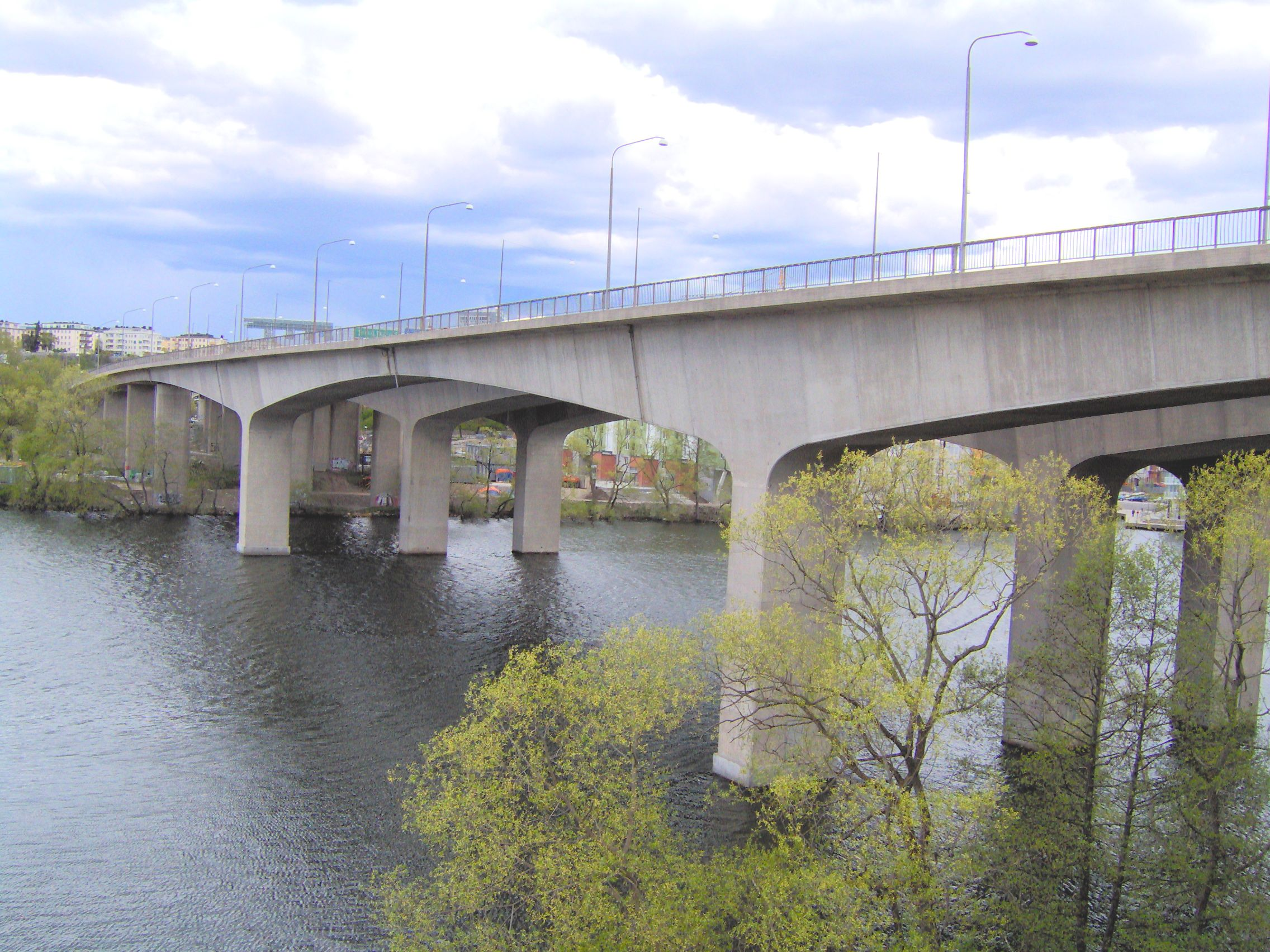
Essingebron connecting Stora Essingen and Lilla Essingen

Stora Essingen is an island and a district in the Kungsholmen borough in Stockholm, Sweden. It is located adjacent to Lilla Essingen on Lake Mälaren. Both Essingen Islands are mainly residential areas. Stora Essingen is scattered with private houses and apartment buildings. The Essingeleden motorway, part of European route E4, passes along a section of the eastern shore. The Tvärbanan light rail passes near the eastern shore and has one stop on the island.

== History ==
The increasing number of summer residences built on Stora Essingen during the 18th century were during the early 20th century gradually transformed into permanent residences. Momentum was added to the sales of the residences after 1929 when Essingebron bridge was built, connecting Stora Essingen to Lilla Essingen.

== Bridges of Stora Essingen ==
- From Lilla Essingen
  - Essingebron, two parallel bridges, one for the motorway, another for local road traffic
- From the mainland, southeast:
  - Gröndalsbron, two parallel bridges, one for the motorway, another for the light rail line
- From the mainland, northwest:
  - Alviksbron, for the light rail, pedestrians, and bicycles
