= Fredhällsbron =

Bridge in central Stockholm, Sweden

Coordinates: 59°19′36.3″N 18°0′25.0″E

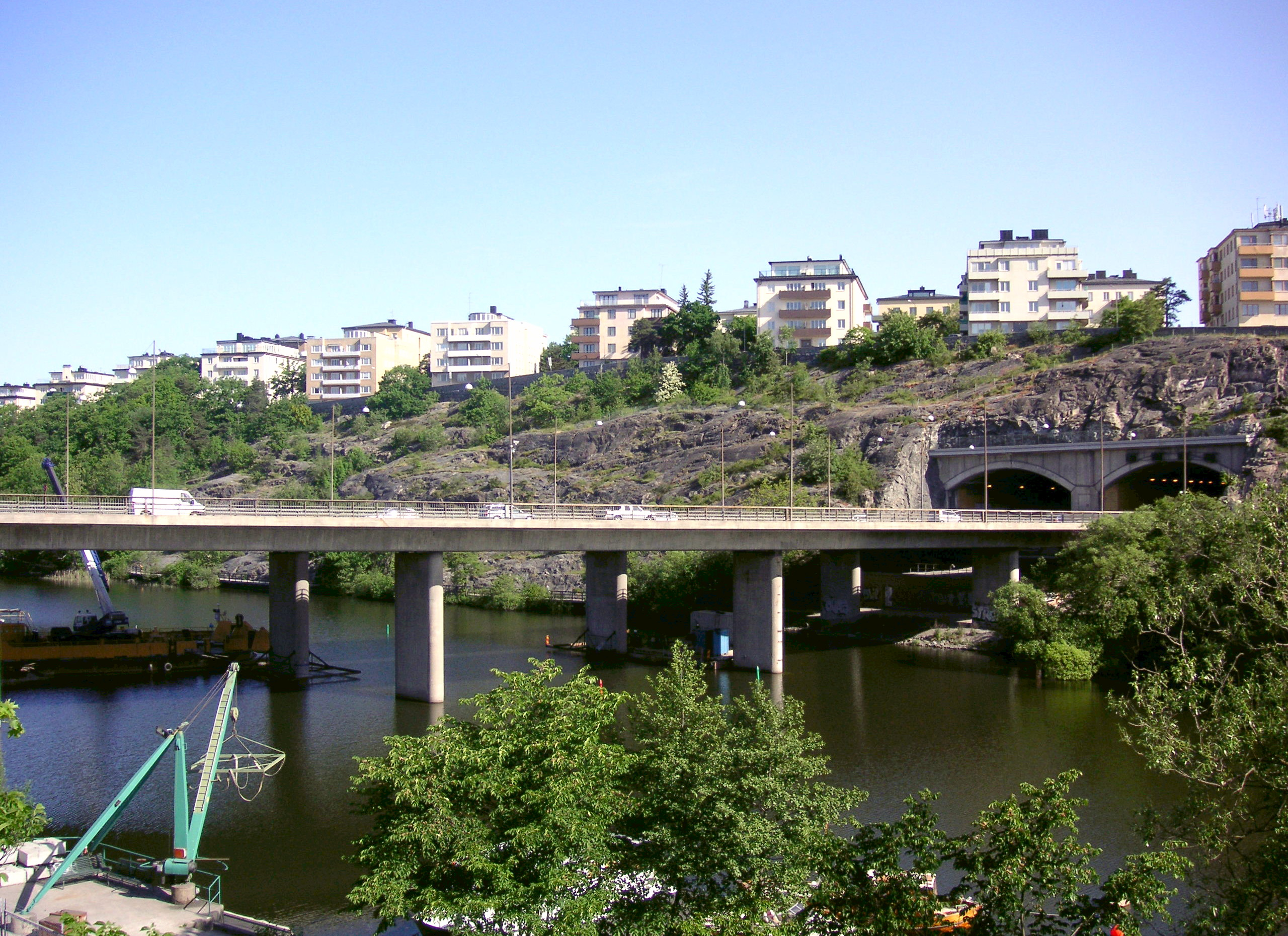
Fredhällsbron from Lilla Essingen

Fredhällsbron (Swedish: The Fredhäll Bridge) is a bridge in central Stockholm, Sweden. It connects the island Lilla Essingen to Fredhäll, a district on the island Kungsholmen, and, forming a section of the Essingeleden motorway, connects the Lilla Essingen interchange to the tunnel Fredhällstunneln.

The bridge is made of pre-stressed concrete cellular sections forming two parallel, separate roadways, each 270 metres long and 14,8 metres wide with horizontal clearances of 9 metres.

In 2004, 19,084 private cars per day (6 AM - 20:59 PM) entered inner Stockholm via the Fredhäll Bridge, a number decreased by 38% during the Stockholm congestion tax trial in 2006.

== See also ==
- List of bridges in Stockholm
- Mariebergsbron
- Essingebron
