= Kungsholmen =

Island in the Lake Mälaren in Stockholm, Sweden

Coordinates: 59°20′N 18°2′E

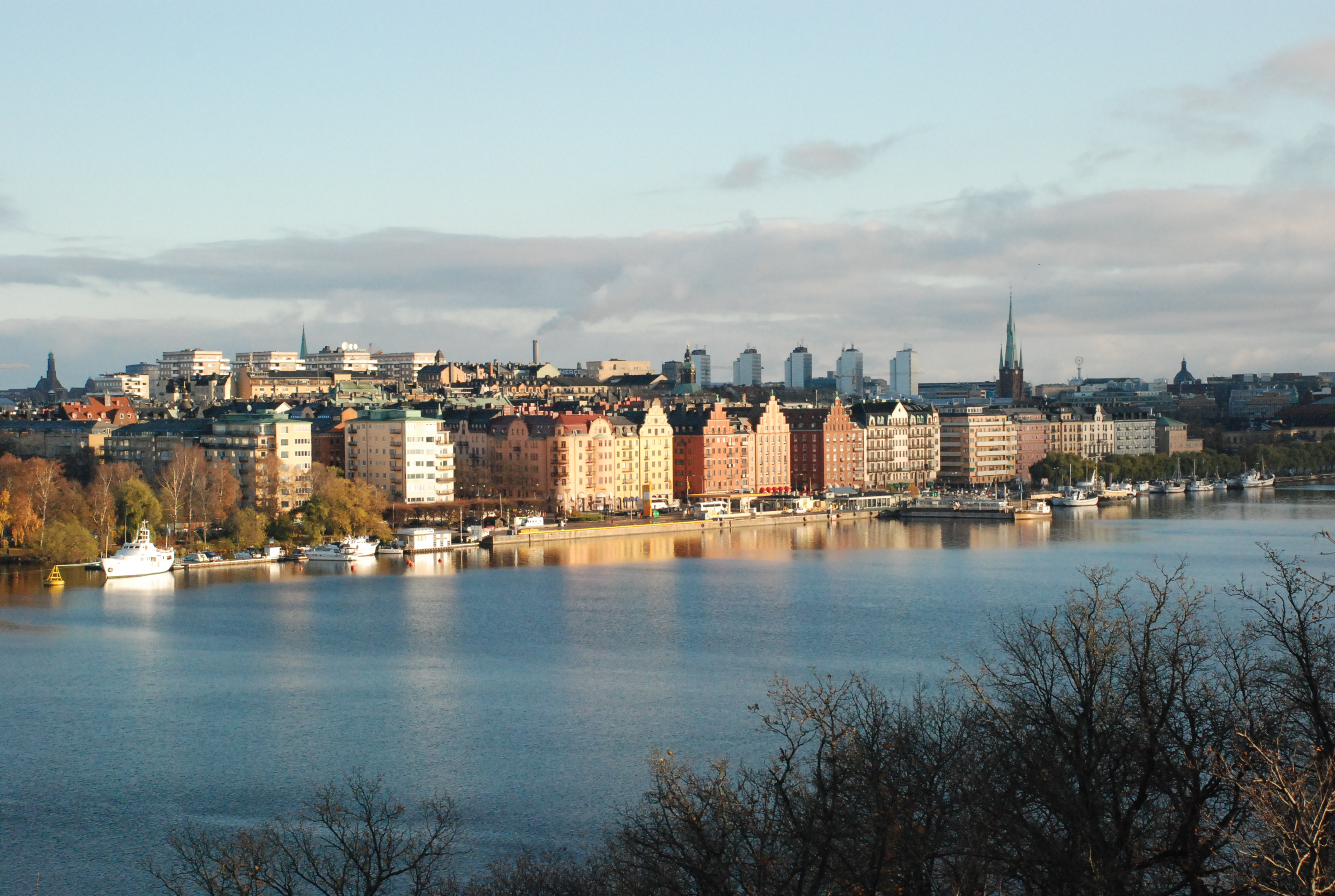
Kungsholmen shoreline

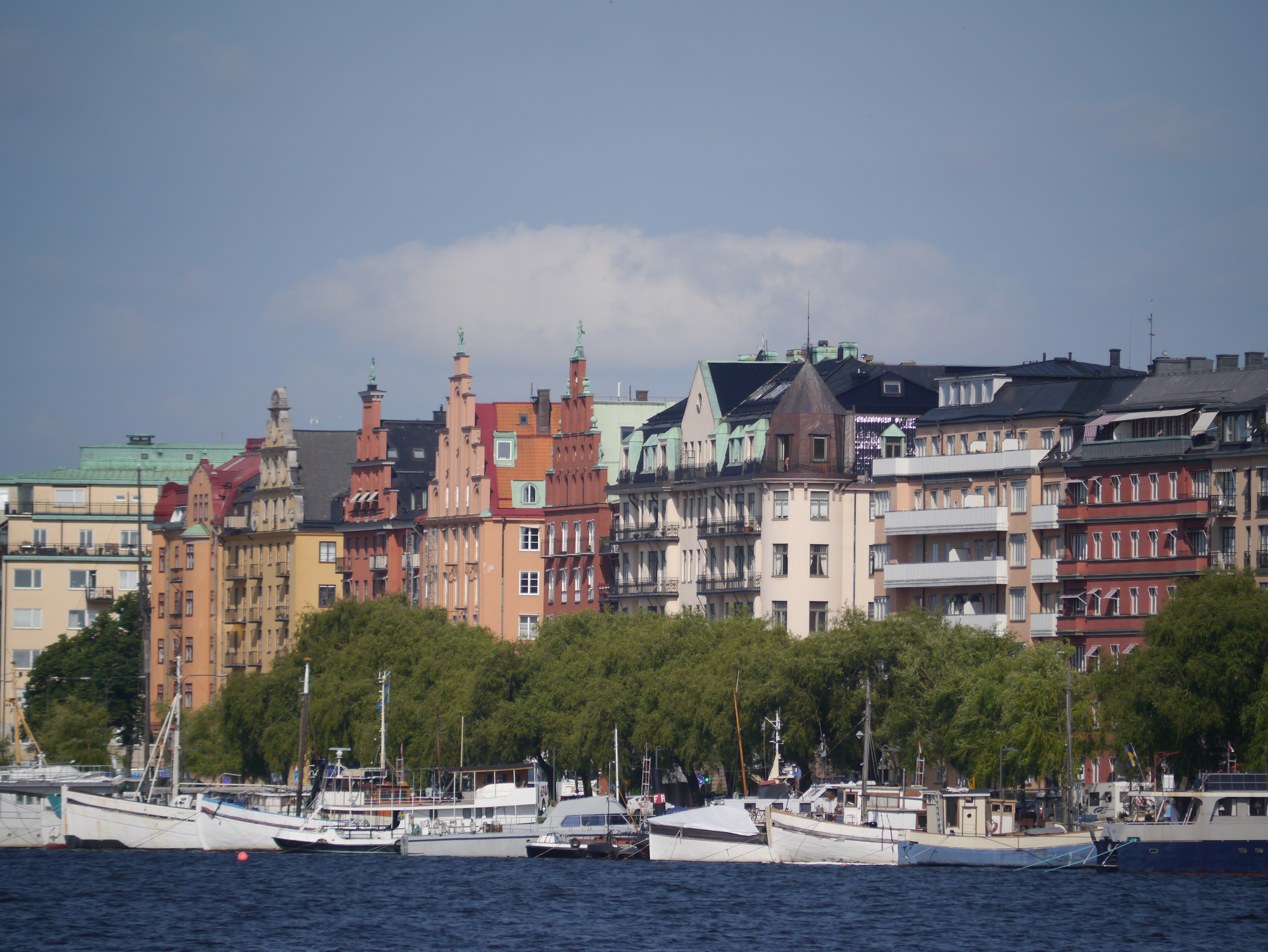
View to the Island of Kungsholmen

Kungsholmen is an island in Lake Mälaren in Sweden, part of central Stockholm, Sweden. It is situated north of Riddarfjärden and considered part of the historical province Uppland. Its area is 3.9 km^{2} (1.5 sq mi) with a perimeter of 8.9 km (5.5 mi). The highest point is at Stadshagsplan at 47 metres (154 ft). The total population is 71,542 (December 31, 2020).

Administratively, it is subdivided into the five districts Kungsholmen, Marieberg, Fredhäll, Kristineberg and Stadshagen.

== History ==
=== Establishment ===
Franciscan friars from Greyfriars, Stockholm, began living on the island in the 15th century. Because of this, the island was named Munklägret (the Monks' encampment). The friars subsisted on cattle-breeding and fishing. They also managed the brickyard Själakoret at Rålambshov. As a result of the Swedish Reformation, which was concluded at the parliament in Västerås 1527, the friras were expelled and the area became property of the crown.

At the end of the 16th century, Johan III (son of Gustav Vasa) established an additional brickyard on the northern bank of the island. In 1635, the first bridge to Munklägret was built.

A few years later, Queen Kristina donated large areas of land in the western part of the island to some of the generals from the Thirty Years War. They built magnificent entails and laid out great gardens. In 1644, the crown donated the eastern part of Munklägret to the authorities of the city of Stockholm, which then received its first city plan. Three years later, the remainder of the island was donated.

In order to facilitate migration to Munklägret, privileges were given to artisans and manufacturers. For example, they were allowed to set up operations there without having to belong to the guilds and they were exempted from tax for ten years. In 1672, Munklägret became a separate parish (Kungsholmen) and the whole island was renamed Kungsholmen, meaning King's Island in Swedish.

=== Industrialization ===
When the Swedish Empire collapsed in the beginning of the 18th century the crown embarked on a generous economic policy to develop Kungsholmen, which was then largely empty of buildings. The entails were turned into factories and hospitals. In Hornsberg, a cotton mill was established, at Marieberg a porcelain factory. In the early 19th century, the military began to settle in Kungsholmen, which at the time was still a sparsely populated idyll.

When Samuel Owen settled in Kungsholmen, it had begun developing into a marked district of factories and workers. This development was accentuated when the Bolinder brothers started building up their business at Klara Sjö, west of the Kungsbron, (King's Bridge) in the mid-19th century. The company AB Separator was established at the end of the 19th century. AB Separator would soon become a worldwide group of companies and at the beginning of the 20th century had more than 2,000 employees.

The industrial breakthrough led to a huge population explosion. The population grew from just over 4,000 people in 1860 to 26,000 in 1890. During the 1880s, several apartment blocks were built to remedy the housing shortage.

=== Modern Kungsholmen ===
In the early 20th century, a radical structural change took place on Kungsholmen. The remnants of the old industrial district were swept away and replaced by housing and public institutions. St. Görans church was designed by architect Gustaf Améen (1864–1949) and built in 1910. At the division of the Kungsholmen parish in 1925, the new parish was named after the church.

The residential areas in Fredhäll and in Kristineberg were built in the 1930s after a functionalist city plan. The bridges Västerbron and Tranebergsbron were also built the same decade, and Sankt Eriksbron received its current dimensions. The Stockholm Metro was drawn through Kungsholmen in the 1950s, first out to Vällingby and later also another line to Solna, Sundbyberg and Järvafältet. At this time, the military moved out and the large hospital Serafen was supplanted (on another location) by the more modern Saint Göran Hospital.

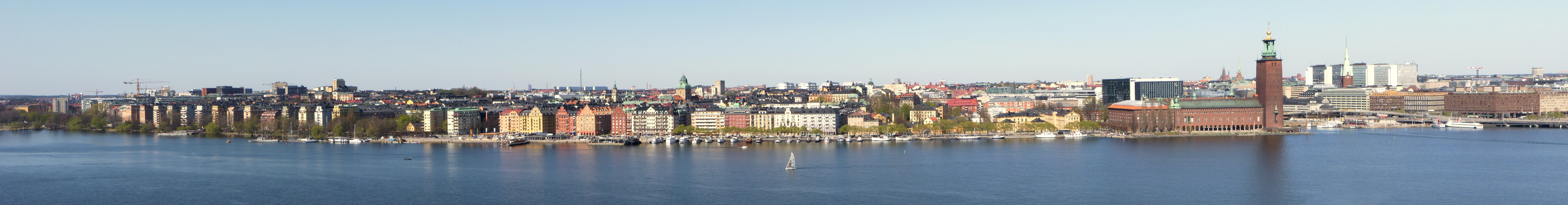
Panorama of Kungsholmen, southern shore with the City Hall on the far right.

== Prominent buildings and structures ==
- Saint Göran Hospital (Swedish: Sankt Görans sjukhus), one of Sweden's oldest hospitals.
- Stockholm City Hall, built 1911–1923.
- Stockholm Court House from 1909–1915.
- Kristineberg Palace from around 1750.
- DN-Skrapan, completed in 1964.
- Rådhuset metro station, opened in 1975.

== Bridges leading to Kungsholmen ==
- From Norrmalm:
  - Stadshusbron
  - Klarabergsviadukten
  - Kungsbron
  - Blekholmsbron
  - Barnhusbron
  - Sankt Eriksbron
- From Solna:
  - Ekelundsbron
- From Bromma:
  - Tranebergsbron
- From Lilla Essingen:
  - Mariebergsbron
  - Fredhällsbron (part of the Essingeleden motorway.)
- From Södermalm:
  - Västerbron

== See also ==
- Geography of Stockholm
- History of Stockholm
