= Essingeleden =

Motorway in central Sweden

Coordinates: 59°20′42″N 18°00′40″E

Essingeleden is a motorway that goes from Solna to Stockholm, Sweden, crossing the westmost parts of central Stockholm, by going over Kungsholmen, Lilla Essingen, and Stora Essingen. Essingeleden has three bridges – Fredhällsbron (270 m), Essingebron (470 m), and Gröndalsbron (460 m) – and one tunnel, Fredhällstunneln (210 m), which is one of the busiest tunnels in Europe. The road is part of European route E4 and E20, and is the busiest road in Sweden, with about 150,000 vehicles per day. In August 2007 this has increased to 170,000 cars per day, because Essingeleden was then the only road through central Stockholm exempt from the Stockholm congestion tax, and because of repairs of the main road through the inner city. This has caused big traffic jams on Essingeleden and Södra länken. Since 1 January 2016, Essingeleden has been subject to the congestion tax.

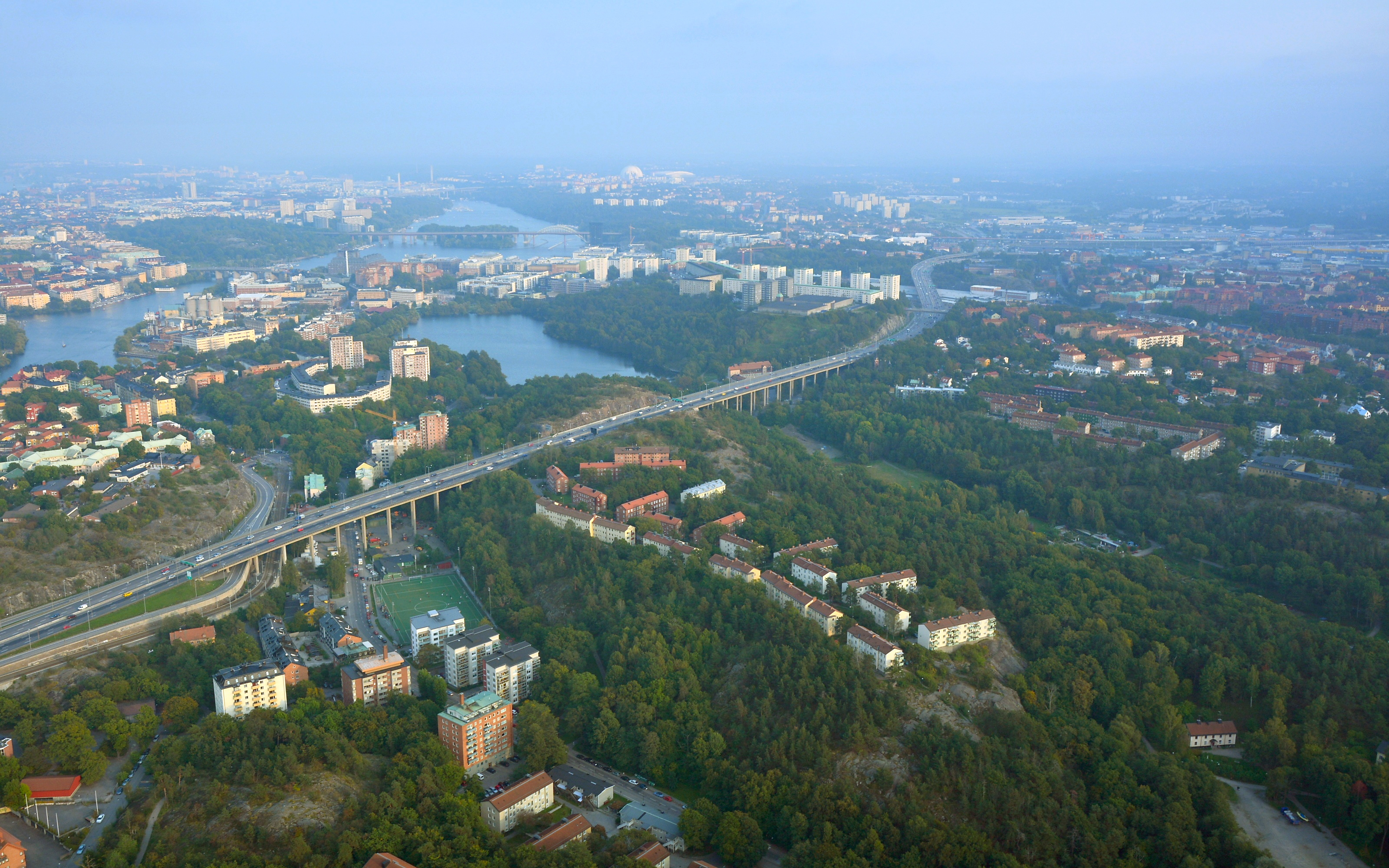
September 2014 aerial view of Essingeleden looking south.

== History ==
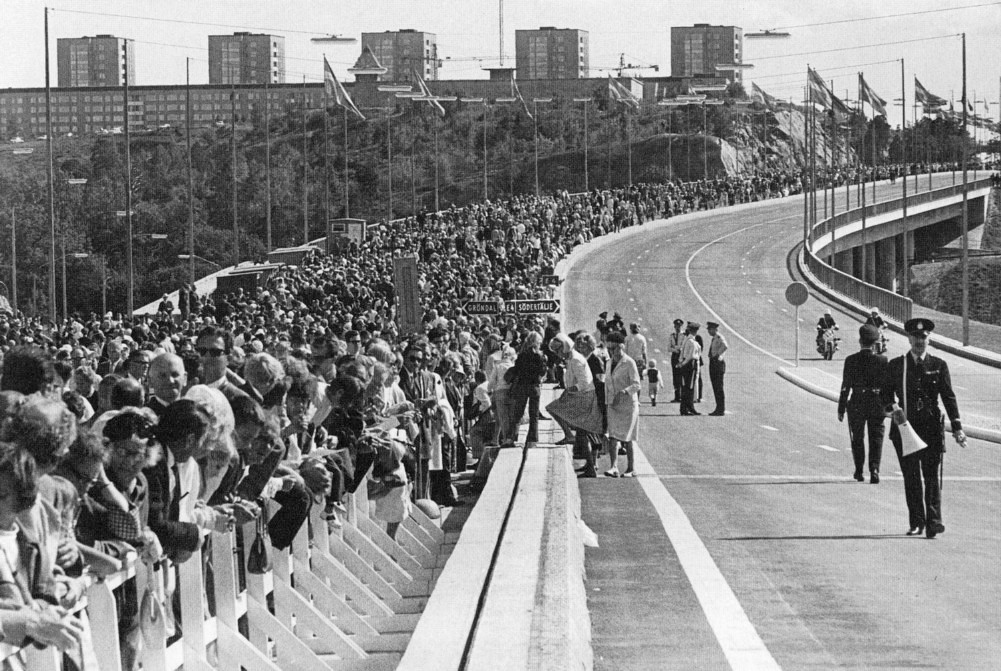
Opening of Essingeleden 1966

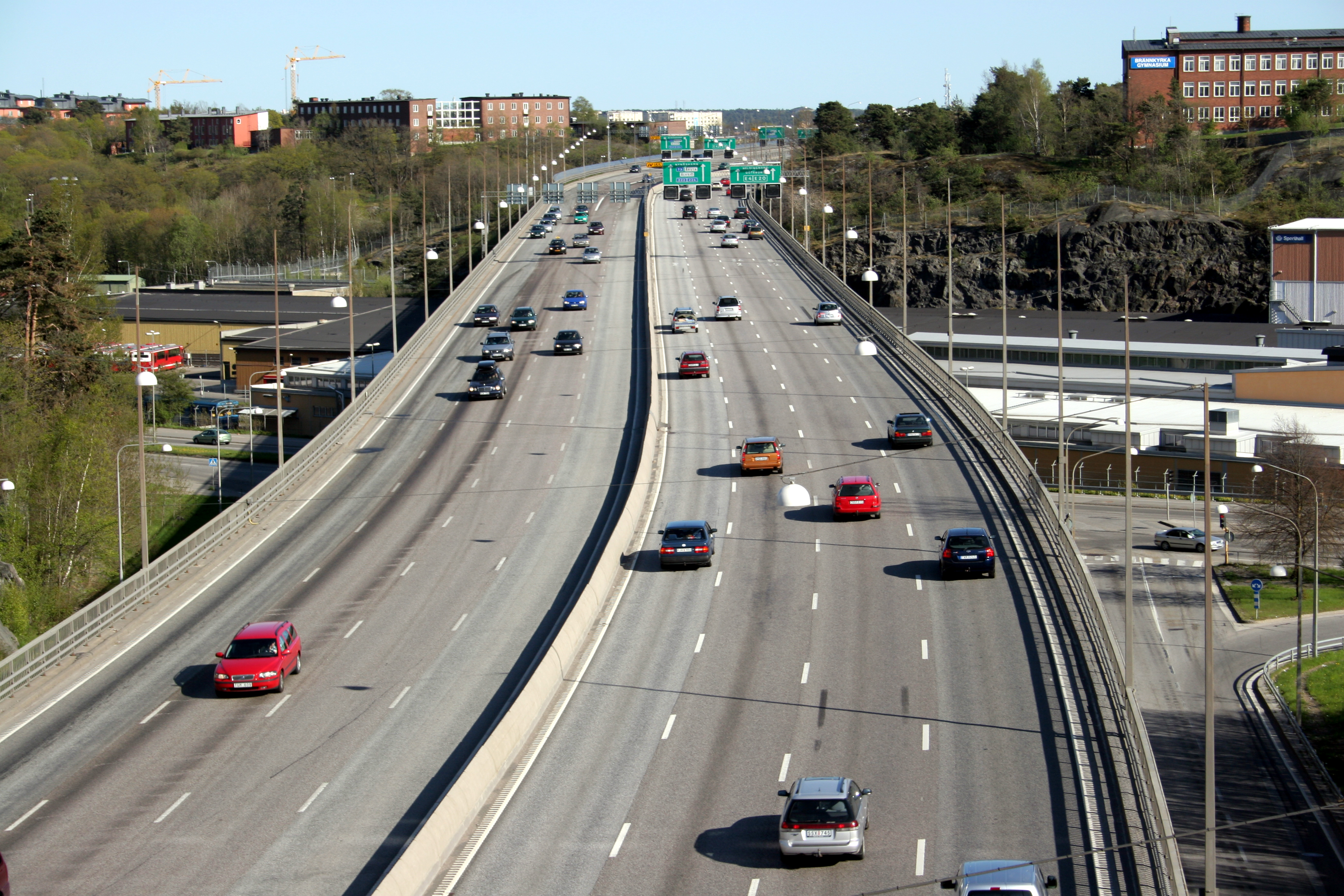
Essingeleden southbound

The road was inaugurated on 21 August 1966 by Tage Erlander with two temporary lanes in each direction on the western half of the road, as Sweden was about to switch over to right-hand sided traffic the next year. The road was fully operational in September 1967 after Sweden had switched over to right-hand side traffic, and Essingeleden became the first six-lane motorway in Sweden.

During the 1990s, the road was repainted from six lanes to eight lanes to increase the capacity.

== Plans ==
Essingeleden has on several occasions been included in plans to create a ring road around Stockholm. Southern Link opened in 2004 and the Northern Link opened 2015. No eastern link has been planned to date (August 2024).

A new parallel motorway is under construction further west, "Förbifart Stockholm". It will have several tunnels and is expected to cost around 25 billion SEK. The Stockholm congestion tax (gross tax amount 800 MSEK/year) is supposed to be used for this and other road and public transit projects in Stockholm. The construction started in 2014 after several years of debating and planning.

== Gallery ==
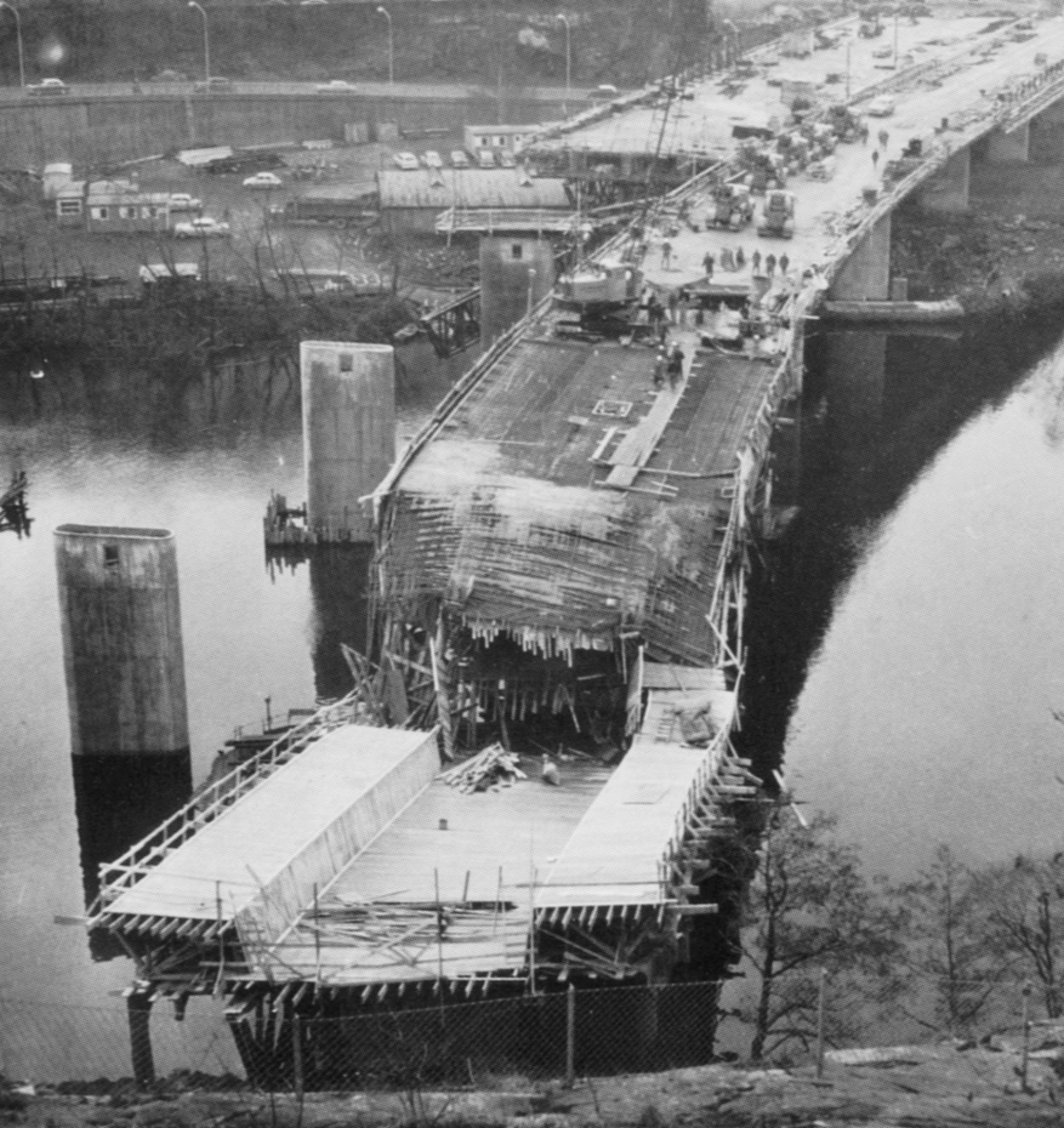
Fredhäll bridge in 1964 after a collapse

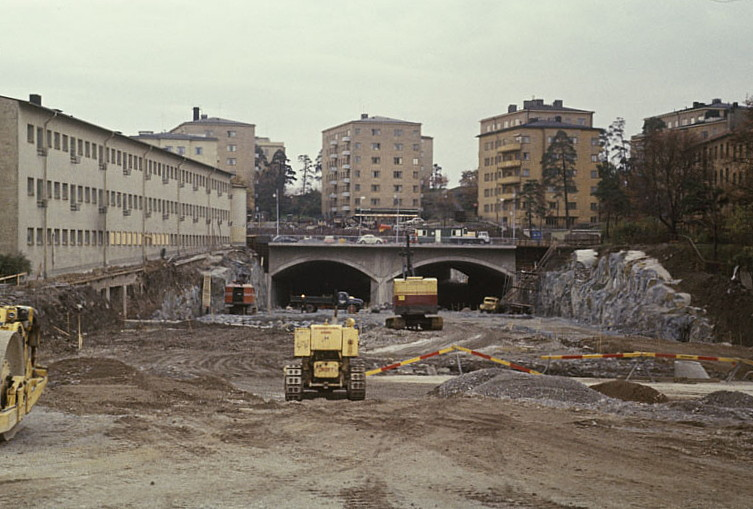
Fredhäll tunnel, 1965

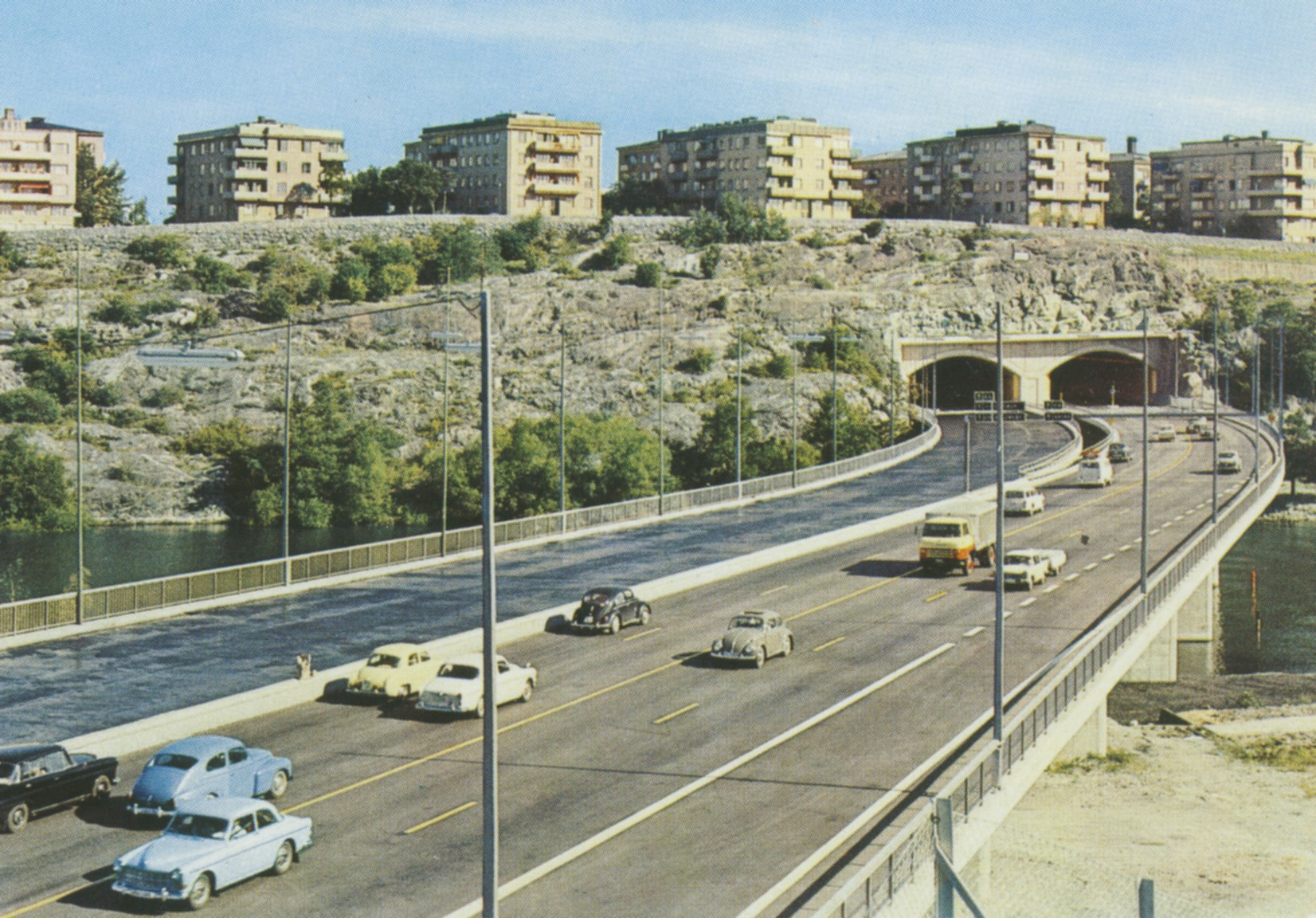
Fredhäll tunnel in 1966, shortly after opening. Notice that only one roadway is used

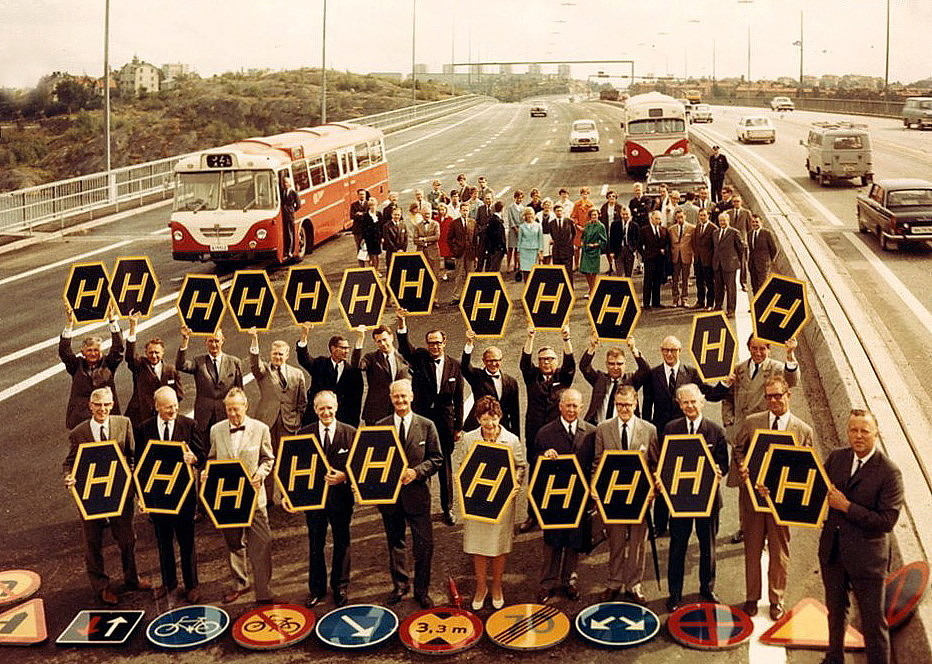
Essingeleden on the 3rd of September 1967

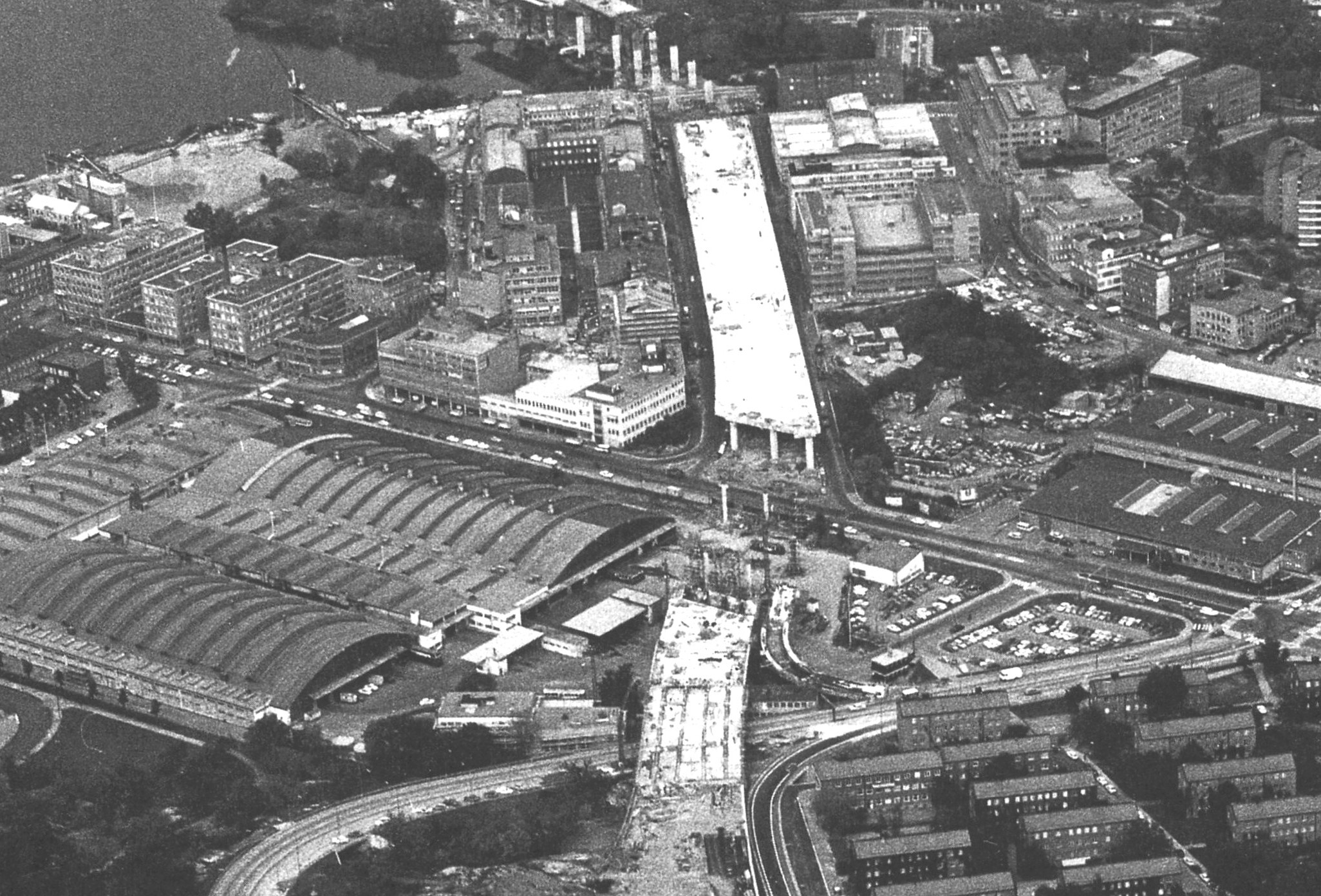
Construction underway at Kungsholmen in 1968

== See also ==
- Geography of Stockholm
- Gröndalsbron
- Essingebron
- Fredhällsbron
