= List of rivers of Sweden =

This is a list of the rivers of Sweden.

== Baltic Sea ==
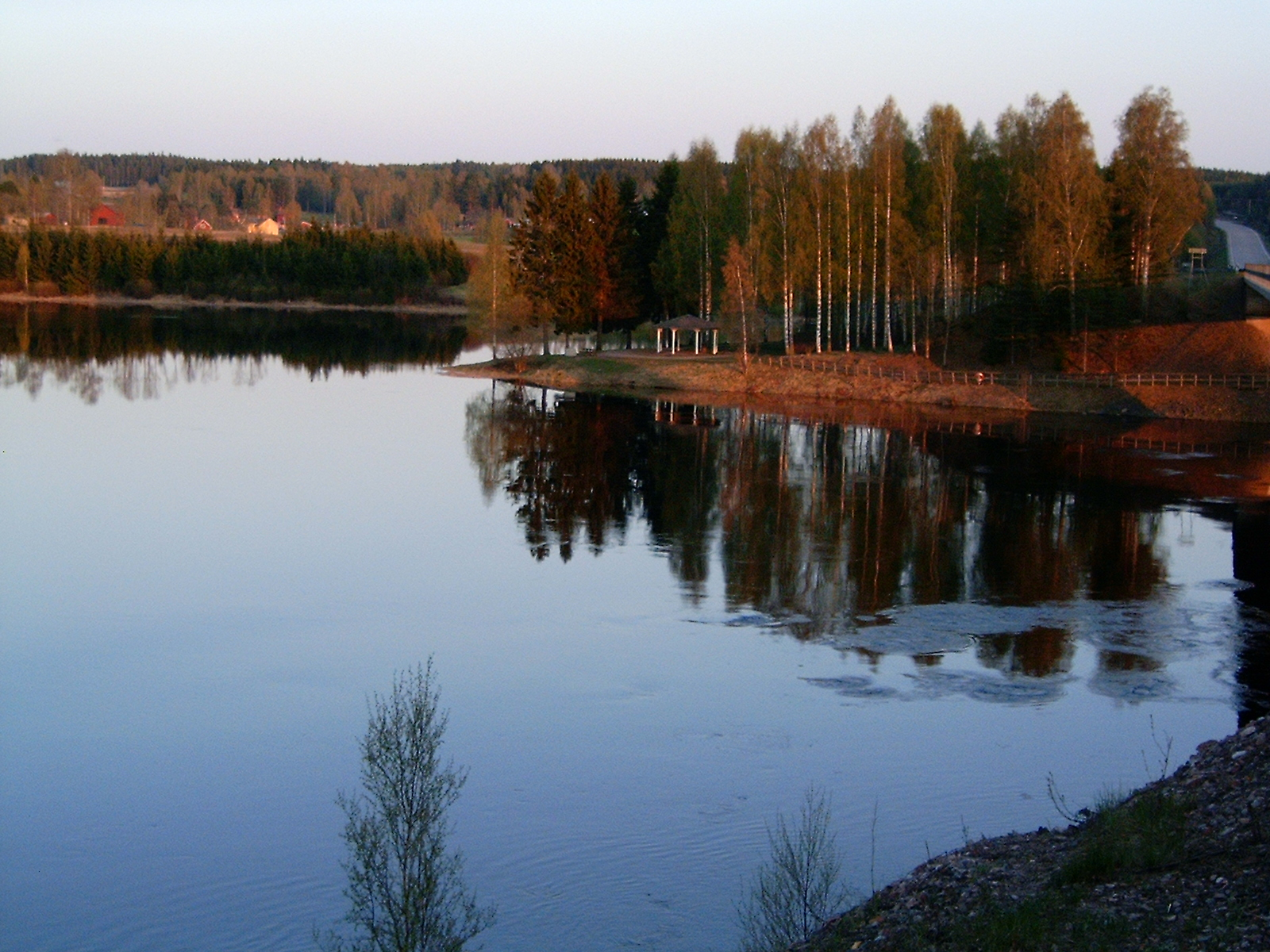
Dalälven

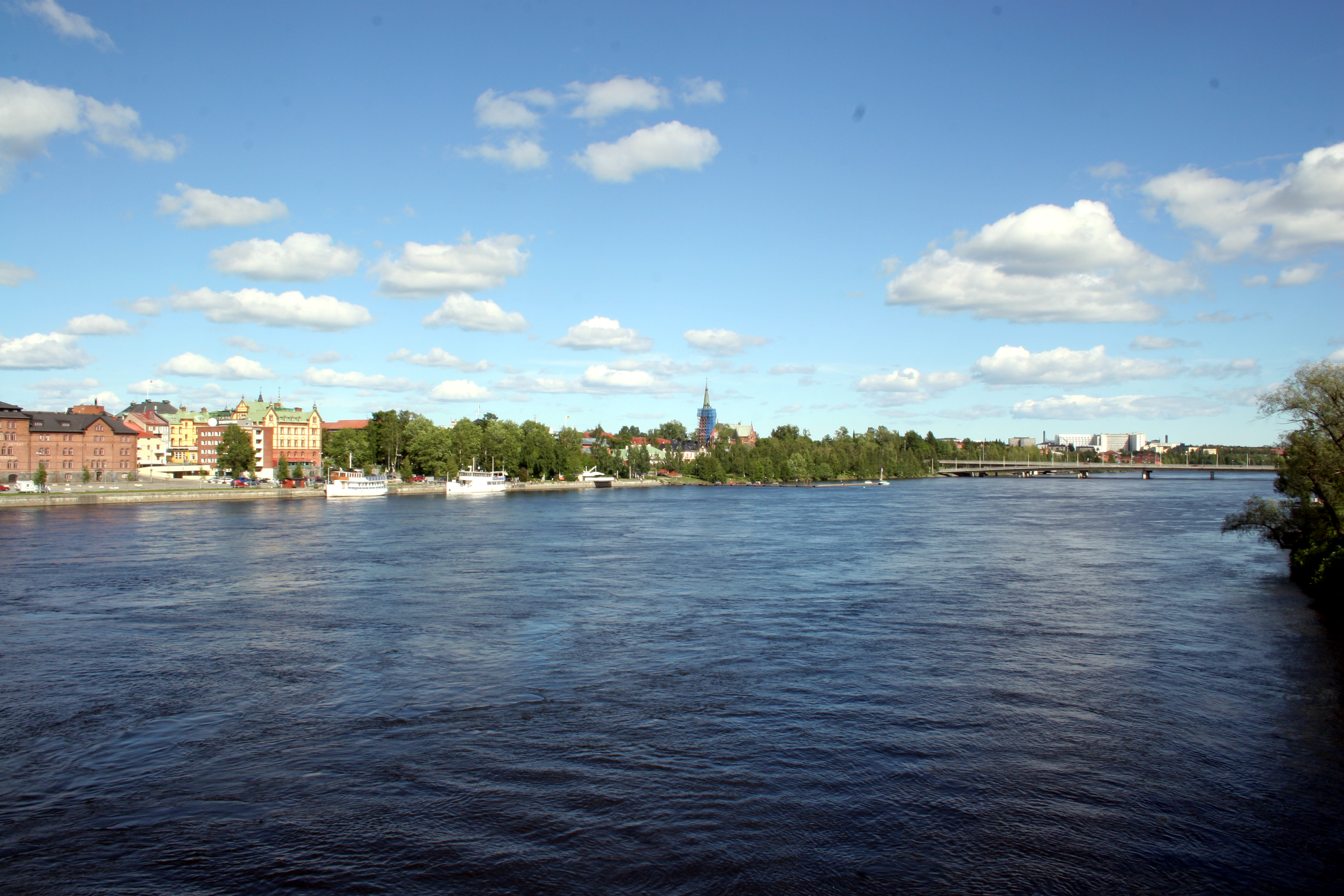
Ume älv

From south to north

- Helgeå
- Ljungbyån
- Ronnebyån
- Motala ström with Svartån

=== Bothnian Sea ===
- Dalälven
- Ljusnan
- Ljungan
- Indalsälven
- Ångermanälven
- Ume älv

=== Bothnian Bay ===
- Skellefte älv
- Pite älv
- Lule älv
- Kalix älv
- Torne älv

== Kattegat ==
- Lagan
- Nissan
- Ätran
- Viskan
- Göta älv - Klarälven (via Lake Vänern)

== A-Z ==
A-Z of Swedish rivers. The lengths in kilometers are also given:

River	Length (in km)	Length (in mi)
Aapuajoki	20	12
Aareajoki	40	25
Aavajoki	25	16
Ääverijoki	20	12
Abmoälven	80	50
Abramsån	45	28
Åbybäcken	18	11
Åbyån	20	12
Åbyån	35	22
Åbyälven	170	110
Ackan	15	9.3
Acksjöån	65	40
Acksjöälven	100	62
Adakbäcken	15	9.3
Ådalsån		
Afsån	45	28
Aggbäcken	10	6.2
Åggojåhka	30	19
Åggojåhkå	15	9.3
Åhedån	20	12
Ahmajoki	12	7.5
Äihämäjoki	50	31
Äijäjoki	25	16
Ainattijoki	40	25
Ainettijoki	30	19
Airijoki	13	8.1
Äivisjukke	17	11
Akajoki	20	12
Äkäsjoki	60	37
Åkerbäcken	20	12
Åkersström	40	25
Åkerån	50	31
Akkajoki	40	25
Aksijoki	25	16
Alån	85	53
Älandsån	20	12
Alanen Kihlankijoki	30	19
Albäcken	15	9.3
Ålbäcken	14	8.7
Ålboån	20	12
Åldamsbäcken	11	6.8
Alderängesån		
Älgabäcken	12	7.5
Älgsjöbäcken	11	6.8
Älgåbäcken	11	6.8
Älgån	20	12
Älgån	10	6.2
Älgängsån	25	16
Ålhultsån	25	16
Ålhusån	16	9.9
Aliseatnu		
Ålkärrsbäcken	10	6.2
Ållajåhka	20	12
Ällan	30	19
Ällingån	25	16
Ållojåhkå	15	9.3
Aloppebäcken	16	9.9
Allmosälven	15	9.3
Allmänningsån	20	12
Allvarsån	30	19
Allån	18	11
Almaån	65	40
Almån	20	12
Älmån	15	9.3
Aloppan	40	25
Ålsån	70	43
Alskabäcken	25	16
Alslövsån	20	12
Alsterälven	50	31
Alsterån	125	78
Alsån	50	31
Ältaån	2	1.2
Alterälven	80	50
Alträskbäcken	17	11
Alträskån	20	12
Åman	95	59
Ämån	60	37
Åmålsån	35	22
Ammerån	200	120
Amsån	20	12
Ämtan	14	8.7
Ämtån	6	3.7
Ämtenån	5	3.1
Anabäcken	20	12
Anderstorpaån	40	25
Andån	20	12
Ängaån	20	12
Ängån	20	12
Angelån	15	9.3
Ängerån	45	28
Ångerman	460	290
Ängesbäcken	17	11
Ängesån	205	127
Ångsjöån	17	11
Angsjöbäcken		
Angstabäcken	13	8.1
Anjeströmmen	50	31
Anneforsån	35	22
Anråsån		
Anråsälven	25	16
Ansjöån	30	19
Anstaån	20	12
Ansättån	20	12
Anån	30	19
Aplungsälven	15	9.3
Applerumsån	35	22
Appokälven	70	43
Äran	40	25
Arån	35	22
Årängsån	30	19
Arbogaån	160	99
Årbolsälven	25	16
Armasjoki	70	43
Armsjöbäcken	25	16
Årosälven	95	59
Arpatsbäcken	30	19
Årrejåhkå	13	8.1
Arrojoki	40	25
Arvattsån	20	12
Arvån	40	25
Åsakabäcken	13	8.1
Åsarpsån	30	19
Åsbobergsbäcken	17	11
Åsboån	30	19
Åsebyälven	20	12
Åsjöälven	10	6.2
Äsjöån	6	3.7
Äskan	10	6.2
Aspan	20	12
Aspån	20	12
Äspebäcken	18	11
Ässan	20	12
Ässingån	55	34
Assman	60	37
Åtjärnsbäcken	20	12
Åtorpsån	20	12
Ätran	240	150
Avansbäcken	20	12
Avasjöbäcken	16	9.9
Averstadån	16	9.9
Avgurjohka		
Ävjan	8	5.0
Avströmmen	8	5.0
Axån	6	3.7
Äxingsån	17	11
Backeån	10	6.2
Badaälven	50	31
Badebodaån	70	43
Baksjöbäcken	20	12
Baksjöån	7	4.3
Bakvattsån	20	12
Bakälven	13	8.1
Balån	30	19
Banafjälsån	14	8.7
Bankeån	10	6.2
Barlindshultsälven	10	6.2
Bastanbäcken	16	9.9
Basthöjdsälven	14	8.7
Bastuån		
Bastån	13	8.1
Beivurbäcken	17	11
Belån	12	7.5
Bensjöån	9	5.6
Bergshamraån	25	16
Bergshyttån	14	8.7
Bergsjöån		
Bergsmannijoki	25	16
Bergvallsån		
Bergvattenån	80	50
Bergån		
Betsarnbäcken	9	5.6
Bieljaurjåkka	50	31
Biellojukke	35	22
Billan	30	19
Billingsån	8	5.0
Billstaån	45	28
Billån	16	9.9
Biskopsån	8	5.0
Bivarödsån	50	31
Bjorvasseln	20	12
Bjurbäcken	20	12
Bjurbäcken	8	5.0
Bjurbäcken	9	5.6
Bjurbäcken	17	11
Bjurbäcken	55	34
Bjurbäcken	14	8.7
Bjurforsbäcken	17	11
Bjurvallabäcken	20	12
Bjurån (Västerbotten)	30	19
Bjurån (Norrbotten)	40	25
Bjurånaälven	8	5.0
Bjurälven		
Bjällstaån	14	8.7
Bjärkabäcken	20	12
Bjärkeån	14	8.7
Bjässjöån	16	9.9
Björka älv	40	25
Björkeån	11	6.8
Björkeån	40	25
Björklingeån	40	25
Björkselbäcken	18	11
Björträskbäcken	13	8.1
Björkvattsån	18	11
Björkån	19	12
Björkån	50	31
Björkån	15	9.3
Björna-Lillån		
Björnsjöån	14	8.7
Björnån		
Björsjöån	13	8.1
Björvasslan	10	6.2
Blackälven	115	71
Blankan	17	11
Bleckåsån	25	16
Blekhemsån	14	8.7
Bliksån	13	8.1
Blommaälven	20	12
Blåkullån		
Blåkölsbäcken	15	9.3
Blädjan	40	25
Bocksbäcken	14	8.7
Bockträskbäcken	20	12
Bodabäcken	30	19
Bodanäsån	18	11
Bodaån	20	12
Bodaån	15	9.3
Bodaälven	20	12
Bodbäcken	25	16
Bodeleån	9	5.6
Bodsjöbyån	25	16
Bodträskån	90	56
Bodvillån	11	6.8
Bodån	55	34
Bogerudsälven	8	5.0
Bokvarnsån	55	34
Bolanders bäck	21	13
Bollstaån	30	19
Bolmån	155	96
Bolån	12	7.5
Bomsjöbäcken	17	11
Borgan	30	19
Borgforsälven	60	37
Borgvikeälven	65	40
Borrsjöån	40	25
Borrälven	10	6.2
Bortaälven	20	12
Borån	11	6.8
Bossån	15	9.3
Bosån	12	7.5
Botorpsströmmen	75	47
Botvasslan	9	5.6
Brattaälv	14	8.7
Bratteforsån	25	16
Brattforsbäcken	17	11
Brattorpsån	11	6.8
Braxenån	14	8.7
Braån	30	19
Bredshultån	20	12
Bredsjöbäclen	15	9.3
Bredsjöån	18	11
Bredsjöälven	14	8.7
Bredträskbäcken	20	12
Bredträskbäcken	11	6.8
Bredträskbäcken	30	19
Bredvallen	8	5.0
Bredån	6	3.7
Brehungån	15	9.3
Brinnsjöån	8	5.0
Brobybäcken	18	11
Bronaån	20	12
Brossån	9	5.6
Broströmmen	45	28
Broån	20	12
Broälven	11	6.8
Bruatorpsån	40	25
Brubäcken	18	11
Bruksån	14	8.7
Bruksån	30	19
Brunnan		
Brunnvasselån	20	12
Bruokejukke	9	5.6
Bråboån	11	6.8
Brånsån	25	16
Bråån	50	31
Bräkneån	85	53
Brändån	20	12
Brändängesbäcken	25	16
Brännbäcken	11	6.8
Bränningeån	15	9.3
Brännälven	30	19
Brömsebäck	20	12
Bröttjärnaån	9	5.6
Bubergsån	15	9.3
Bulsjöån	45	28
Bultbäcken	12	7.5
Bunnran		
Buran	18	11
Bureälven	115	71
Burån	13	8.1
Buskån	11	6.8
Buvattsälven	15	9.3
Byaån	8	5.0
Bynoret	20	12
Byrströmmen	6	3.7
Bysjöån	8	5.0
Byskeälven	230	140
Byssjan	30	19
Byvattenån	15	9.3
Byxsjöbäcken	11	6.8
Byån	13	8.1
Byälven	190	120
Bålbäcken	11	6.8
Bålsjöån	10	6.2
Bångå	14	8.7
Båthusbäcken	14	8.7
Båtsabäcken	20	12
Båtsaströmmen	25	16
Bäckebrobäcken	14	8.7
Bäcksälsvallen	8	5.0
Bäckån	30	19
Bäljane å	35	22
Bäljane å	13	8.1
Bällstaån		
Bälöbäcken	12	7.5
Bärfendalsälven	14	8.7
Bärmsjöån	8	5.0
Bärreksån	10	6.2
Bäsebäck	11	6.8
Bäskån	55	34
Bäverbäcken	25	16
Bäverbäcken	12	7.5
Bäverån	20	12
Bäverån	30	19
Bäveån	45	28
Bölesån	12	7.5
Bölsmanån	14	8.7
Bönälven	95	59
Bötån	12	7.5
Böan	23	14
Daddån	20	12
Daikanbäcken	25	16
Daimaån	25	16
Dainabäcken	17	11
Dalaån	19	12
Dalbergsån	110	68
Dalkarlssjöbäcken	12	7.5
Dalkarlså å	45	28
Dalköpingeån	15	9.3
Dalsån	40	25
Dalsälven	20	12
Dalån	17	11
Dalälven	557	346
Dammån	85	53
Darnekenjukke	20	12
Darrhaädno		
Datiksjöbäcken	20	12
Degerbäcken	10	6.2
Degernäsbäcken		
Degerträskån	30	19
Dellikälven	70	43
Delångersån	155	96
Dergabäcken	50	31
Djupbäcken	10	6.2
Djupbäcken	17	11
Djupå	17	11
Djupån	20	12
Djuran	20	12
Djurgårdsbrunnskanalen	1	0.62
Djurlångsån	14	8.7
Djursdalaån	10	6.2
Djurån	20	12
Dockasälven	20	12
Dockstaån	25	16
Dofsan	25	16
Dohnaforsån	18	11
Domneån	25	16
Drafsån	25	16
Dragasjöbäcken	11	6.8
Draggån	30	19
Drevja	50	31
Drillaån	25	16
Driveån	20	12
Drombäcken	11	6.8
Dryllån		
Dunkehallaån	14	8.7
Dunsjöån	15	9.3
Dybäcksån	20	12
Dyltaån	105	65
Dynestadsån	18	11
Dypån	12	7.5
Dyrasbäcken	16	9.9
Dyrån		
Dysjöån	30	19
Dysån	40	25
Dysån	16	9.9
Dyvelan		
Dyverån		
Dyvran		
Dåasån	30	19
Dälpan	17	11
Dänningen	12	7.5
Dävelsbäcken	13	8.1
Dövlaån	15	9.3
Döderhultsbäcken	16	9.9
Eckarån	15	9.3
Edbäcken	20	12
Edenbergaån	20	12
Edslan	30	19
Edsmyrån	11	6.8
Edstabäcken	11	6.8
Edsån	70	43
Edsån	40	25
Egnaredsån		
Ekaån	16	9.9
Ekorrbäcken	20	12
Ekorrån	11	6.8
Eksjöbäcken	11	6.8
Eksågsån	20	12
Ekån	18	11
Elingeån	8	5.0
Elmabäcken	12	7.5
Emmaån	60	37
Emmesån	12	7.5
Emån	230	140
Enan	60	37
Enan	30	19
Enarenån	8	5.0
Enköpingsån	25	16
Enningdalsälven	90	56
Enskälan	16	9.9
Enstabäcken	20	12
Enån	17	11
Enån	25	16
Enångersån	25	16
Eriksdalsälven	50	31
Ertsjärvån	15	9.3
Esmebäcken	14	8.7
Fadabäcken	14	8.7
Fageredsån	25	16
Fagerekeån	18	11
Faluån	50	31
Fanbyån	50	31
Fangan	30	19
Farestaån		
Farstorpsån	20	12
Faxbrynnen		
Faxälven	400	250
Feman	35	22
Femtingaån	12	7.5
Fenningsån		
Fettjeån		
Fianbäcken	18	11
Fiellarjukke	15	9.3
Fifallaån	7	4.3
Fillingerumeån	25	16
Fimtaån		
Finnbobäcken	17	11
Finnforsån	35	22
Finnmorbäcken	11	6.8
Finnsjöån	20	12
Finnträskån	20	12
Finnån	9	5.6
Finnån	30	19
Finnälven	6	3.7
Fisklösån	25	16
Fiskonbäcken	25	16
Fiskviks kanal	15	9.3
Fiskån		
Fitunaån	18	11
Fjällbäcken	10	6.2
Fjällsjöälven	260	160
Fjälltjärnån	14	8.7
Fjälån	30	19
Fjärlövsån	16	9.9
Fjätan	95	59
Flarkbäcken	20	12
Flarkån	35	22
Flarkån	105	65
Flasabäcken	20	12
Flatsbäcken	12	7.5
Flena	30	19
Flenaån	14	8.7
Flian	75	47
Flins bäck	20	12
Flisbäcken	25	16
Florån	25	16
Flysån	20	12
Flyttjeån		
Flyälven	10	6.2
Flåsjöån	80	50
Flärkån	85	53
Fläsebäcken	14	8.7
Flögan	18	11
Forsaån	20	12
Forsaån	25	16
Forshällaån		
Forsmarksån	55	34
Forsnäsån	25	16
Forsträskbäcken	11	6.8
Forsviksån	13	8.1
Forsån	20	12
Forsån	25	16
Forteälven		
Foskan	30	19
Foskvattsån	30	19
Fredskogsån	14	8.7
Fremsbäcken	15	9.3
Friaån	30	19
Fräkentorpsån	11	6.8
Fräkenträskbäcken	20	12
Fröjadalsbäcken	18	11
Frösteboån	45	28
Fröstån	20	12
Frösvidalsån		
Fuan	40	25
Fulan	80	50
Funnan	17	11
Furuhultsån	30	19
Fuån	20	12
Fyleån	9	5.6
Fylleån	65	40
Fyrisån	95	59
Fyrån	35	22
Fågelvattenån	8	5.0
Fångån		
Fårbäcken	20	12
Fårnåsälven		
Fårträskbäcken	11	6.8
Fåssjöån	20	12
Fäbodtjärnbäcken	13	8.1
Fälarån	8	5.0
Fällbäcken	12	7.5
Fälpvattsån	6	3.7
Fälån	11	6.8
Fämtan	50	31
Fänan	17	11
Fänjaån	9	5.6
Fänån	9	5.6
Färbäcken	10	6.2
Färgeån		
Färgån	30	19
Färlev älv	10	6.2
Färsån	15	9.3
Färvilsån		
Fävikån		
Försjöbäcken	13	8.1
Föskeforsälven	20	12
Gagnån	14	8.7
Galasjöån	30	19
Gallakbäcken	20	12
Gallbäcken	15	9.3
Gallån	20	12
Galtströmmen	16	9.9
Galvattsån	20	12
Galån	35	22
Gammalån	20	12
Gammelstillaån	20	12
Gammelån	6	3.7
Gannan	20	12
Gardsjöbäcken	35	22
Gargån	80	50
Garneälven	20	12
Garphytteån	20	12
Gavelhytteån	60	37
Gavleån	130	81
Gejmån	40	25
Genevadån	35	22
Geran		
Gerisån	7	4.3
Gerseboån	10	6.2
Gerssjöbäcken	14	8.7
Gesundaån	7	4.3
Getabrobäcken	12	7.5
Getaån	13	8.1
Getbroån	20	12
Getbroälven	13	8.1
Getterån	48	30
Getån	20	12
Getån	25	16
Gideälven	240	150
Gilleran	50	31
Gillån	20	12
Gimmaån	29	18
Gimån	190	120
Ginsjöbäcken	20	12
Gisselån	13	8.1
Gisselåsån	20	12
Gissjöån	16	9.9
Gisslarboån	45	28
Gissmansvattenån	17	11
Gisterån	25	16
Gitsån	30	19
Gladbäcken	11	6.8
Glasholmsån	30	19
Glasälven	45	28
Glimån	13	8.1
Glitterån	13	8.1
Glose å	10	6.2
Glottrabäcken	11	6.8
Glumman	35	22
Glötan	25	16
Gnarpsån	40	25
Gnyltån	16	9.9
Gnällbäcken	13	8.1
Gonäsån	17	11
Gopån		
Gopalån	13	8.1
Gothemån	50	31
Graften	12	7.5
Granan	35	22
Grannebyån	14	8.7
Gransjöån	30	19
Granån	25	16
Granån	30	19
Granån	20	12
Granån	35	22
Granån	40	25
Granån	60	37
Granån	20	12
Gravan	30	19
Gravån	13	8.1
Griffelån		
Grimmavadet	20	12
Grimsån		
Grimån	20	12
Grisbäcken	16	9.9
Grissleån	13	8.1
Gruckån	30	19
Grunan	9	5.6
Grundbäcken	16	9.9
Grundträskbäcken	20	12
Grundträskån	25	16
Grundöjan	30	19
Gryckån	50	31
Gryssjögroven	10	6.2
Gryssjöån		
Grytgölsbäcken	12	7.5
Grytsjöån	13	8.1
Grytån	16	9.9
Grytån	8	5.0
Gryvlan	25	16
Gråsjöån	11	6.8
Gråskaån	17	11
Gråtanån	25	16
Gråvalsån		
Gräddån	9	5.6
Gräftån	11	6.8
Grängsjöån	20	12
Gräningsån	16	9.9
Grässjöbäcken	20	12
Grätnäsån	20	12
Gröna	45	28
Gröningsån	30	19
Grönå	20	12
Gröpplebäcken	16	9.9
Gröppleån	15	9.3
Grössjöån	6	3.7
Grövlan	50	31
Gullbäcken		
Gullsjöälven	18	11
Gullspångsälven	250	160
Gullströmsån	18	11
Gullträskbäcken	30	19
Gulån	25	16
Gundleboån	10	6.2
Gunnaboån	20	12
Gunnarbäcken	50	31
Gunnarsån	7	4.3
Gunnarvattsån	36	22
Gunneboån	25	16
Guortabäcken	18	11
Gusemålabäcken	15	9.3
Gussisjöån	12	7.5
Gussvattenån	8	5.0
Guttan	40	25
Gysån	40	25
Gyttjeån	18	11
Gådaån	12	7.5
Gådeån	45	28
Gålarmoraån	16	9.9
Gålösån	15	9.3
Gårdaån	18	11
Gårdsjöån		
Gårdsåsälven	13	8.1
Gårdvedaån	65	40
Gåsån	6	3.7
Gåsån	11	6.8
Gåxsjönoret	30	19
Gäddträskån	30	19
Gänsån	30	19
Gärdan	25	16
Gärdsrudsbäcken	14	8.7
Gärebäcken	15	9.3
Gärsjöbäcken	10	6.2
Gärssjöbäcken	20	12
Gärån	16	9.9
Gönan		
Görjeån	65	40
Görslövsån	13	8.1
Göta älv	93	58
Göta älv / Klarälven	746	464
Götån	13	8.1
Habbestorpebäcken	16	9.9
Haddängsån		
Hagaån	25	16
Hagbyån	75	47
Haggeån	30	19
Hagån		
Hagälven	18	11
Hajumsälven	35	22
Hakerudsälven	20	12
Hakån		
Halgån	55	34
Hallabäcken	14	8.7
Hallstaån	30	19
Halltorpsån	50	31
Halån	35	22
Hamborgsån	7	4.3
Hammarskogsån	20	12
Hammarsån		
Hammelsströmmen	20	12
Hamrångeån	10	6.2
Handsjöån	12	7.5
Handölan	50	31
Hanhijoki	20	12
Harmångersån	90	56
Harrbäcken	12	7.5
Harrijåhka		
Harrijoki	16	9.9
Harrträskbäcken	17	11
Harrån	30	19
Harsjöbäcken	30	19
Hartijoki	20	12
Harundan	15	9.3
Harån	15	9.3
Hasselån	11	6.8
Hassjöån	6	3.7
Hasslan	25	16
Hasslarpsån	20	12
Hasslebäcken	15	9.3
Hasslingsån	35	22
Hattabäcken	12	7.5
Hattsjöån	25	16
Haukarjåhkå	17	11
Havrabäcken	15	9.3
Havsjöälven	12	7.5
Havsvallen	14	8.7
Havån	16	9.9
Hedenlundaån	50	31
Hedströmmen	125	78
Hedån	9	5.6
Hegelån		
Helgaboån		
Helge å	200	120
Helgån	13	8.1
Hemgravsån	30	19
Hemlingsån	50	31
Hemulån	35	22
Henan	20	12
Henarån		
Henån	25	16
Herrestorpeån	9	5.6
Herteån	25	16
Herängsån	18	11
Hietasenjoki	15	9.3
Himleån	40	25
Hindabäcken	25	16
Hinnan		
Hinnsjöån	25	16
Hian	18	11
Hjorsetån	15	9.3
Hjortsbergaån	30	19
Hjoån	15	9.3
Hjuksån	45	28
Hjulån	8	5.0
Hjåggbölebäcken	20	12
Hjärtaredån	30	19
Hoan	80	50
Hobergsån	14	8.7
Hogarälven	15	9.3
Hokaån	25	16
Holmabäcken	18	11
Holmsbäcken	9	5.6
Holmsjöbäcken	20	12
Holmsundet	20	12
Holmsvattsbäcken	18	11
Holmsån	20	12
Holmträskbäcken	15	9.3
Holmträskbäcken	32	20
Holmån	14	8.7
Holtaneälven	10	6.2
Holån		
Horgeån	14	8.7
Hornsjöbäcken	13	8.1
Hornvallaån		
Hornån	17	11
Horrmundsvallen	60	37
Hosjöån	10	6.2
Hostån		
Hovaån	20	12
Hovermoån	40	25
Hovgårdsån	15	9.3
Hovmanneån	6	3.7
Huftabäcken	15	9.3
Huhtajoki	20	12
Hulabäcken	13	8.1
Hulan	200	120
Hulekvillen	12	7.5
Hultsjöån	10	6.2
Hultån	14	8.7
Humlebäcken	17	11
Humpån	25	16
Hundsjöån	14	8.7
Hundsjöbäcken	18	11
Hundån	6	3.7
Husbyån	65	40
Husån	90	56
Huvudsjöbäcken	30	19
Hyboån	17	11
Hylteån	16	9.9
Hynnan	13	8.1
Hyttbäcken	15	9.3
Hyttån	17	11
Hyttälven	14	8.7
Hagaån	35	22
Hallborgsån	25	16
Hågaån		
Hålsaxabäcken	13	8.1
Håmojåhka	25	16
Hångelån		
Hårkan	180	110
Håvaån	40	25
Häbbersbäcken	25	16
Hädanbergsån	35	22
Häggån	50	31
Hälan	50	31
Hällestadsån	85	53
Hällingsån	45	28
Hällsjöbäcken	16	9.9
Hällsjöälven	15	9.3
Hällån	20	12
Hältorpsån	15	9.3
Hämmensån	17	11
Härjån	100	62
Härån	12	7.5
Hässjaån	60	37
Hästgångsån	14	8.7
Hästån	6	3.7
Hättorpsån	30	19
Hättvasselån	9	5.6
Hättälven	12	7.5
Höcklingsbäcken	12	7.5
Högboån	25	16
Högerumsån	16	9.9
Högfjärdån	14	8.7
Högforsån	40	25
Högforsälven	20	12
Högnäsån	25	16
Högvadsån	50	31
Höje å	40	25
Hökesån	20	12
Höksjöälven	20	12
Hökvattsån	25	16
Höljan	35	22
Höljån	17	11
Hörbyån		
Hörlingeån	30	19
Hörnån	70	43
Hörtingerumsbäcken	12	7.5
Höstån	10	6.2
Höviksån	11	6.8
Höörsån		
Ickån	35	22
Idbyån	40	25
Idbäcken	12	7.5
Idbäcken	11	6.8
Idbäcken	18	11
Idijoki	50	31
Idvattenbäcken	14	8.7
Idån		
Igelälven	25	16
Iittojoki	18	11
Illån	20	12
Imälven	20	12
Indalsälven	431	268
Indån	18	11
Ingsån	6	3.7
Insjöbäcken	13	8.1
Inviksån	25	16
Ireå	17	11
Isalaån	24	15
Isnäsström	55	34
Isteån	30	19
Isträskbäcken	25	16
Isätrabäcken	15	9.3
Ittetjuolmajåhkå	17	11
Ivarsbyälven	20	12
Jamtmyrån	9	5.6
Jangsälven	11	6.8
Jansabäcken	17	11
Jansjönoret	25	16
Jarenjåhka	18	11
Jarrebäcken	30	19
Jerisjoki	40	25
Jietajoki	40	25
Jonsbergsån	30	19
Joranbäcken	20	12
Jorälven	17	11
Jostojoki	18	11
Jovattsån	40	25
Jugån	14	8.7
Jukkasjoki	30	19
Juksjaurbäcken	21	13
Juktån	150	93
Jularboån	30	19
Juleströmmen		
Jumkilsån	40	25
Jungån	35	22
Junojoki	50	31
Junsterbäcken	14	8.7
Juojoki	20	12
Jussanjoki	20	12
Juån	30	19
Jädraån
Jällån	12	7.5
Jämnån	32	20
Jämtån	22	14
Järilån	45	28
Järkvisslebäcken	15	9.3
Järperudsälven	30	19
Järvbäcken	15	9.3
Järån	30	19
Järån	10	6.2
Jättån	25	16
Jävreån	30	19
Jönsån	10	6.2
Jörlovsälven	20	12
Jössbäcken	9	5.6
Kaarejoki	25	16
Kaarnesjoki	45	28
Kabusaån	17	11
Kafjärdsgraven	15	9.3
Kaipabäcken	40	25
Kaitumjåhka	20	12
Kaitumälven
Kajtasijoki	14	8.7
Kakubölesån	14	8.7
Kalix River	472	293
Kallbäcken	9	5.6
Kallån		
Kaltisbäcken	20	12
Kamajåhkå	50	31
Kangosjoki	30	19
Kanijåhka	18	11
Kannusjoki	12	7.5
Kantsjöbäcken	11	6.8
Karijoki	20	12
Karlsbäcken	25	16
Karlsforsälven	55	34
Karsbäcken	60	37
Karvsjöån	7	4.3
Kasenbergsån	15	9.3
Kaskasjåhkå	20	12
Kassjöån	20	12
Katebrobäcken	15	9.3
Kattebäck	13	8.1
Kattån	35	22
Kaunisjoki	70	43
Kavleån	20	12
Kaxån		
Kedjan	25	16
Kelojoki	30	19
Kenttäjoki	17	11
Keräsjoki	65	40
Kesasjoki	20	12
Kesjöån	9	5.6
Kesuån		
Kettilsjöån		
Keupån	18	11
Kilan	70	43
Kilaån	60	37
Kilaälven	13	8.1
Kilbergsån		
Kilingaån	30	19
Kilisån	50	31
Kilsån	10	6.2
Kilån	40	25
Kilängsån	8	5.0
Kindsjöån	9	5.6
Kingsån	13	8.1
Kinnbäcken	11	6.8
Kinnvallen	20	12
Kirjesån	50	31
Kitkiöjoki	20	12
Kivijoki	40	25
Klappmarkbäcken	17	11
Klarälven	460	290
Kleveån	13	8.1
Kliarydsån	17	11
Klingavälsån	35	22
Klingstorpabäcken	18	11
Klintboån	14	8.7
Klintforsån	60	37
Klockarbäcken	13	8.1
Klockarebäcken	30	19
Klockareån	14	8.7
Klockarån	14	8.7
Kloppanån	16	9.9
Klubboån	30	19
Klubbån	16	9.9
Klubbälven	30	19
Klämmabäcken	20	12
Kläppsjöbäcken	25	16
Klövån	11	6.8
Knarrbyån	35	22
Knipån	25	16
Knivstaån	13	8.1
Knivån	20	12
Knoälven	40	25
Knärån	18	11
Knöösinoja	18	11
Kolbäcksån	200	120
Kolningån	55	34
Kolån	14	8.7
Korpikån	40	25
Korsträskbäcken	20	12
Kortingån	20	12
Koutojoki	20	12
Krabbebäcken	10	6.2
Kramforsån	25	16
Krikinpojanjoki	14	8.7
Krikån		
Krokan	15	9.3
Kroknorsbäcken	14	8.7
Kroksjöån	6	3.7
Kroksån	16	9.9
Krokån	70	43
Krusån	20	12
Krutån	35	22
Krycklan	20	12
Krypan	25	16
Kråkån		
Kräftbäcken	16	9.9
Kräftån	25	16
Kräggan	20	12
Kubbobäcken	11	6.8
Kugerbäcken	18	11
Kuittasjoki	30	19
Kulbäcken	30	19
Kulijoki	20	12
Kullaån	10	6.2
Kultran	20	12
Kumla älv	11	6.8
Kumlaån	25	16
Kumsjöån		
Kungsbackaån	40	25
Kungsbäcken	25	16
Kungsvekaån	8	5.0
Kunttjärnsälven	16	9.9
Kuobmujåhkå	16	9.9
Kuolpanjåhka	25	16
Kuoperjåhkå	10	6.2
Kuoujajåhkå	17	11
Kurusjoki	16	9.9
Kusabäcken	14	8.7
Kusån	25	16
Kutsasjoki	40	25
Kvarnbäcken	15	9.3
Kvarntorpsån	40	25
Kvarnån	20	12
Kvarnån	10	6.2
Kvarnån	30	19
Kvarnälven	9	5.6
Kvarseboån	8	5.0
Kvesarumsån	17	11
Kvällån	45	28
Kyllingsån	20	12
Kyndelsbäcken	12	7.5
Kyrkån	15	9.3
Kågeälven	95	59
Kålabodaån	30	19
Kårsajåhka	20	12
Kårån	25	16
Kåtokjåhkå	20	12
Kåtån	25	16
Kägleån	20	12
Kälkån	20	12
Kälvån	20	12
Kälån	20	12
Kämpegårdsån	12	7.5
Kärentöjoki	20	12
Kärrån	18	11
Kävlingeån	100	62
Käymäjoki	30	19
Kääntöjoki	20	12
Köarån	11	6.8
Kölan	18	11
Köljeån	15	9.3
Kölsjöån	40	25
Kölstaån	35	22
Könserumsån	20	12
Köpingsån	40	25
Lilla Stensån	14	8.7
Ladtjojåhka	35	22
Laduån	10	6.2
Lafsan	50	31
Lagan	230	140
Laggarboån	30	19
Laggälven	20	12
Lagnäsån	40	25
Lahnajoki	30	19
Lainioälven	260	160
Laisbäcken	20	12
Laisälven	190	120
Lakabäcken	35	22
Lakavattsån	30	19
Lankälven	20	12
Lannaån	25	16
Lanån	13	8.1
Lappbäcken	20	12
Larsboån	25	16
Latikbäcken	15	9.3
Lavabäcken	20	12
Lavasån	12	7.5
Lavsjöån	30	19
Laxbäcken	30	19
Laxsjöån	9	5.6
Laxöringsbäcken	12	7.5
Laån	25	16
Ledingsån	45	28
Leduån	60	37
Ledvassbäcken	20	12
Leipapbäcken	14	8.7
Leipiöjoki	25	16
Leipojoki	20	12
Lejarälven	30	19
Lejstaån	25	16
Lekarebäcken	10	6.2
Lekarydsån	35	22
Lekarån	20	12
Lekhytteån	12	7.5
Leksbäcken	12	7.5
Lemman	40	25
Lerbodaälven	17	11
Lerbäcken	12	7.5
Lermejåhkå	25	16
Lerumsån	30	19
Lerälven	20	12
Lesseboån	35	22
Lessujoki	20	12
Lettan	25	16
Letälven		
Levarbäcken	14	8.7
Lianeälven		
Lidan	90	56
Lidenån	9	5.6
Lidhultsån	20	12
Likan	25	16
Lill-Fjätan	30	19
Lill-Härjån	30	19
Lill-Lungnan	20	12
Lilla Helge å	25	16
Lilla Luleälven	240	150
Lillpiteälven	85	53
Lillån		
Lillälven (Dalarna)	2	1.2
Lillälven (Värmland)	140	87
Limån	20	12
Linan	20	12
Linaälven
Linkkabäcken	40	25
Linneforsån	30	19
Linån	19	12
Lissmaån	11	6.8
Listerbyån	35	22
Littran	25	16
Liviöjoki	30	19
Ljungan	400	250
Ljungaån	25	16
Ljungbyån	75	47
Ljungån	60	37
Ljusnan	451	280
Ljusterån	25	16
Ljustorpsån	70	43
Ljusträskbäcken	30	19
Lobbersjöån	12	7.5
Lockringsån	50	31
Lockstaån	40	25
Lofsen	80	50
Loftaån	40	25
Lolokbäcken	18	11
Lombäcken	30	19
Lompolojoki	20	12
Lomsjöån	15	9.3
Lomån	13	8.1
Lorbybäcken	20	12
Lotorpsån	60	37
Lovisebergsälven	25	16
Loån	50	31
Lugnbäcken	14	8.7
Lugnån	20	12
Lule River	470	290
Lummån	18	11
Lumpån	30	19
Lundaboån	15	9.3
Lundsbergsälven	14	8.7
Lunen	35	22
Lungsjöån	20	12
Lungälven	40	25
Lunndörrsån	25	16
Luongasjoki	35	22
Luossajoki	20	12
Lustbäcken	14	8.7
Lustån	55	34
Luvkullvattenån	17	11
Lyan	20	12
Lyckebyån	110	68
Lycksabäcken	70	43
Lysan	15	9.3
Lysjöån	11	6.8
Låddan	20	12
Låddejåhkå	35	22
Lågsjöån	14	8.7
Låkkejåhkå	30	19
Lånan	18	11
Långan	135	84
Långbäcken	20	12
Långshytteån	50	31
Långsjöån	25	16
Långsån	20	12
Långträskån	40	25
Långträskälven	60	37
Långvattsbäcken	30	19
Långvattsån	12	7.5
Långån	11	6.8
Låsån	11	6.8
Lädsån	19	12
Länsterån	25	16
Länsöån	17	11
Lärjeån	30	19
Lästringeån	11	6.8
Lätäseno	50	31
Lödran	17	11
Löftaån	30	19
Lögdeälven	200	120
Löjhamnsån	5	3.1
Lömman	10	6.2
Lömån	17	11
Lörbäcken	20	12
Lötån	9	5.6
Lötälven	16	9.9
Lövan	30	19
Lövboån	11	6.8
Lövseleån	9	5.6
Lövsjöälven	9	5.6
Lövstaån	20	12
Lövån	16	9.9
Maattajoki	30	19
Maderbäcken	16	9.9
Maejoki	14	8.7
Magasjöbäcken	25	16
Magnehultsån	17	11
Mailijoki	16	9.9
Maisajoki	17	11
Maivesjåhkå	30	19
Malbäcken	20	12
Maljasjoki	35	22
Malmaån	25	16
Malmån	40	25
Malstaån	15	9.3
Maltan	30	19
Malån	120	75
Malån	15	9.3
Mangslidälven	40	25
Maranjåhkå	20	12
Marsjöån		
Marströmmen	60	37
Marsån	60	37
Marån	17	11
Masugnsbäcken		
Matojoki	10	6.2
Matskanån	35	22
Mattaureälven	50	31
Mattaurjåhkå	30	19
Mattesbäcken	15	9.3
Mattjokbäcken	25	16
Medskogsån	40	25
Medstuguån	40	25
Mejvanbäcken	25	16
Melbyån	17	11
Mellanån	20	12
Mellanälven	20	12
Mellbyån	40	25
Menlösabäcken	13	8.1
Mensträskbäcken	35	22
Merasjoki	60	37
Mesjöbäcken	16	9.9
Miellätno	40	25
Miessaurebäcken	20	12
Mieån	45	28
Mikkelijoki	20	12
Millemålabäcken	15	9.3
Milån	20	12
Mittån	75	47
Mjällån	50	31
Mjögan	15	9.3
Mjölkalångaån	12	7.5
Mjölnaån	50	31
Mjölån	18	11
Mjösjöån	20	12
Mjöån	30	19
Molgan	20	12
Moraån	25	16
Mossån	20	12
Motala ström	285	177
Moån	30	19
Moån	35	22
Moälven	135	84
Muddusälven	50	31
Muggån	20	12
Muljokjåhka	35	22
Munkedalsälven	80	50
Muodosjoki	20	12
Muonioälven	380	240
Muorjejåhkå	16	9.9
Muruån	40	25
Murån	10	6.2
Murån	20	12
Murån	12	7.5
Muskusbäcken	12	7.5
Muskån	30	19
Musån	20	12
Myllyjoki	20	12
Myrträskbäcken	11	6.8
Mysklan	55	34
Mållebäcken	20	12
Målån	20	12
Mångan	16	9.9
Mångbyån	30	19
Mångmanån	20	12
Mångsälven		
Mångån	25	16
Månstadsån	40	25
Månsträskån	30	19
Mårdsjöbäcken	20	12
Mälskarbäcken	14	8.7
Märlan	25	16
Märrån		
Märsabäcken	30	19
Märstaån	14	8.7
Mölingan	20	12
Möllekullaå	14	8.7
Mölleån	7	4.3
Mölndalsån	50	31
Mörlandaån	8	5.0
Mörrumsån	185	115
Mörtsjöbäcken	13	8.1
Mörtsjöbäcken	14	8.7
Mörttjärnbäcken	13	8.1
Mörtträskbäcken	20	12
Mörtån	50	31
Mörtälven	10	6.2
Mösupbäcken	30	19
Naamijoki	90	56
Naartijoki	20	12
Nackaån	10	6.2
Nagasjöån	30	19
Naggån	20	12
Naisbäcken	25	16
Nakerätno	40	25
Namonsbäcken	30	19
Narkausjoki	75	47
Narkån	75	47
Nattajoki	20	12
Naustajåhkå	55	34
Nautasätno	60	37
Navarån	9	5.6
Navran	10	6.2
Nean	40	25
Nedre Pansikån	25	16
Nedre Tälningsån	20	12
Nianån	40	25
Niesajoki	14	8.7
Nietsajoki	17	11
Nilijoki	12	7.5
Nissan	185	115
Nitsån	35	22
Nittälven		
Njakajåhkå	14	8.7
Njallejaurbäcken	15	9.3
Njarkalisjåhkå	13	8.1
Njuorakjåhka	13	8.1
Njuoraätno	50	31
Njuotjanjåhka	25	16
Njuovojåhkå	20	12
Nolbyälven	11	6.8
Noraån	30	19
Norboån	9	5.6
Nordbäcken	15	9.3
Nordre älv	16	9.9
Nordtjärnsälven	14	8.7
Nordån	13	8.1
Nordån	21	13
Noret	40	25
Noret	25	16
Noretbäcken	16	9.9
Noreån	40	25
Norr-Lillån	40	25
Norr-Veman	30	19
Norralaån	40	25
Norrbodbäcken	16	9.9
Norrboån	40	25
Norrbäcken	9	5.6
Norrböleån		
Norrebäcken	17	11
Norrmjöleån	25	16
Norrström	300	190
Norrtäljeån	40	25
Norrviksån		
Norrån	20	12
Norrån	15	9.3
Norrån	30	19
Norrälven	35	22
Norrängsån	11	6.8
Norsbobäcken	14	8.7
Norsjöån	35	22
Norsån	30	19
Norsån	45	28
Norsälven	180	110
Norån	35	22
Nossan	90	56
Nottjärnbäcken	15	9.3
Noån	30	19
Nuorukkajoki	20	12
Nuuksujoki	20	12
Nybroån	40	25
Nygårdsån	20	12
Nyköpingsån	150	93
Nylingsån	14	8.7
Nyrebäcken	18	11
Nyängsån	25	16
Nårvejåhkå	30	19
Nåsjöbäcken	15	9.3
Näcksjöån	14	8.7
Näckån	10	6.2
Näfsån	14	8.7
Näran		
Näresbäcken	14	8.7
Närkån	30	19
Närsån	20	12
Näsbybäcken	10	6.2
Näshultaån	20	12
Näskeån	20	12
Nässjöån		
Nästansjöån	55	34
Näsån	180	110
Nätraån	100	62
Nättrabyån	60	37
Näverijoki	20	12
Näveån	11	6.8
Nävran	35	22
Nävraån	25	16
Nötån	35	22
Obyån	20	12
Ögan	25	16
Ogströmmen	70	43
Ohtanajoki	17	11
Öjan	18	11
Öjeån	18	11
Öjungsån	18	11
Öjvasseln	13	8.1
Öjån	85	53
Oknebäcken	30	19
Ol-Olsån	25	16
Ölån	18	11
Olandsån	80	50
Ölboån	13	8.1
Ölebäcken	18	11
Olingan	30	19
Olingeån	20	12
Ölman	35	22
Olosjoki	45	28
Olsbäcken	35	22
Ömboån	20	12
Önskanån	20	12
Onttojoki	25	16
Opeån	8	5.0
Örån	17	11
Örasjöån	18	11
Örboholmsån	11	6.8
Oreälven	140	87
Örebäcken	10	6.2
Örebäcken	10	6.2
Öredalsån	30	19
Örekilsälven	90	56
Öreälven	240	150
Orgån	30	19
Orjasjoki	20	12
Örlan	20	12
Ormvasslan	10	6.2
Örnstolån	30	19
Ösan	70	43
Osabäcken	20	12
Örsundaån	70	43
Örträskbäcken	18	11
Örupsån	20	12
Östbyån	18	11
Österdalälven
Öster-Kjolån	13	8.1
Österån	50	31
Österån	16	9.9
Österängsån		
Östra Kaskasajåhka	13	8.1
Östra Orlundsån	30	19
Östra Syterbäcken		
Ottervattsbäcken	15	9.3
Ottsjöströmmen	16	9.9
Ounisjoki	50	31
Ovansjö-Vattenån	20	12
Ovån	20	12
Övre Oldan	30	19
Övre Pansikån	25	16
Övrekvarnsälven	13	8.1
Oxbroälven	6	3.7
Oxbäcken	20	12
Oxbäcken	10	6.2
Oxnäsån	25	16
Oxsjöån	13	8.1
Oxundaån	30	19
Oxvattenbäcken	20	12
Paamajoki	20	12
Paankijoki	30	19
Pahtajoki	25	16
Painajaisjoki	30	19
Paittasjoki	14	8.7
Pakajoki	25	16
Pakkojåhkå	25	16
Paktajåhka	20	12
Pallakajoki	13	8.1
Palojoki	70	43
Paltajåhka	16	9.9
Parakkajoki		
Parasbäcken	13	8.1
Parkajoki	60	37
Parkkijoki	13	8.1
Partån	10	6.2
Paubäcken	55	34
Paulajåhkå	16	9.9
Pauliströmsån	55	34
Pellabäcken	14	8.7
Pellijoki	17	11
Pellojoki	20	12
Pengån	30	19
Pennikajoki	17	11
Penningbyån	30	19
Pentäsjoki	60	37
Perstorpsbäcken	20	12
Peräjäjoki	15	9.3
Pesosenjoki	25	16
Pessisjåhka	20	12
Petikån	75	47
Pierujoki	40	25
Piettarasjoki	12	7.5
Pieturajåhkå	17	11
Piilijoki	15	9.3
Pilkbäcken	16	9.9
Pillisoån		
Pillkabäcken	14	8.7
Pineboån	12	7.5
Pinnån	45	28
Pirttiniemenjoki	25	16
Pite River	400	250
Pitsijoki	20	12
Pjältån	30	19
Pjäsörbäcken		
Plågbäcken	12	7.5
Pojmisbäcken	17	11
Porsån	30	19
Portilaån	14	8.7
Pounujoki	12	7.5
Prostgårdsälven	20	12
Prästbäcken	16	9.9
Prästhytteån	25	16
Pulsujoki	60	37
Puolisjoki	30	19
Puotojåhkå	12	7.5
Puottaurebäcken	20	12
Pysäjoki	25	16
Pyttbäcken	20	12
Påkamålabäcken	14	8.7
Pålböleån	40	25
Pålängeån	12	7.5
Påståjåhka	18	11
Päiväjoki	25	16
Pärlälven	140	87
Pösan	20	12
Radnejaurälven	30	19
Raftan	20	12
Rakisätno	55	34
Rakkurijoki	17	11
Raktenjåhkå	30	19
Rambergsån	11	6.8
Rammsjöån	6	3.7
Ramsan	50	31
Ramstaån	25	16
Ramån	10	6.2
Randaljåhkå	20	12
Rannäsaån	4	2.5
Ranån	25	16
Rapaätno	75	47
Rappenjåhkå	50	31
Ratasoja	20	12
Rattsjöälven	20	12
Rattån	12	7.5
Ratuån	25	16
Rauskasjoki	30	19
Rautasälven	135	84
Rautbäcken	16	9.9
Rautojåhkå	18	11
Rauvosjoki	20	12
Ravesjbäcken	15	9.3
Regasjöån	35	22
Rejån		
Rekån	14	8.7
Remmarån	35	22
Renforsbäcken	25	16
Rensjöån	9	5.6
Renträskån	3	1.9
Reunajåhkå	25	16
Ribraurjåhkå	35	22
Rickleån	145	90
Riebnesströmmen	72	45
Rienakkajoki	25	16
Rikebäcken	18	11
Rimojåhkå	25	16
Ringsån	14	8.7
Rinnan	30	19
Rinnån	20	12
Rinnälven	15	9.3
Ripakkajoki	14	8.7
Ripasätno	25	16
Risbäcken	20	12
Riskeboån	10	6.2
Rissajåhkå	20	12
Rissjöbäcken	20	12
Risån	60	37
Riteljåhkå	20	12
Rittakjåhkå	40	25
Rivsjövasslen	9	5.6
Rockbäcken	20	12
Rocknöbäcken	15	9.3
Rocksjöån	15	9.3
Rockån	10	6.2
Roggån	30	19
Rogsån	35	22
Rokån	50	31
Rolfsån	90	56
Romsån	12	7.5
Romälven		
Ronnebyån	115	71
Ronningsbäcken	11	6.8
Ropijoki	16	9.9
Rosseln	25	16
Rossån	20	12
Rosån	13	8.1
Rosån	35	22
Rotnen	70	43
Rottnan	110	68
Rottneån	20	12
Rotån	25	16
Rudsjöån	14	8.7
Rudtjärnsbäcken	17	11
Ruggan	25	16
Rukojoki	14	8.7
Rullån		
Runnarjoki	15	9.3
Ruodusjoki	15	9.3
Ruoktojåhkå	45	28
Ruonasjåhka	16	9.9
Ruonekjåhkå	40	25
Rusbäcken	45	28
Ruskträskbäcken	40	25
Ruskån	20	12
Rutnajoki	18	11
Rutsabäcken	20	12
Rutån	8	5.0
Ryån		
Rymman	30	19
Ryssån	40	25
Råbäcken	11	6.8
Råcksta å	45	28
Rågobäcken	20	12
Råmmån	35	22
Rånden	80	50
Råneälven	215	134
Rångedalaån	14	8.7
Råsjöån	25	16
Råstätno	65	40
Råvvejåhkå	14	8.7
Råån	30	19
Rädan	14	8.7
Räggån	20	12
Rällan	20	12
Rällsjöån	10	6.2
Rällsälven	60	37
Rältån	13	8.1
Rämånaälven	7	4.3
Rängsjöbäcken	9	5.6
Ränkaån	13	8.1
Rännöån	20	12
Rätniltjåhkå	17	11
Rävabäcken	10	6.2
Rävsjöån	15	9.3
Röbackaån	9	5.6
Rödingsträskbäcken	20	12
Rödån	30	19
Röglaån	12	7.5
Röjan	40	25
Röjdan	75	47
Rökbergsån	11	6.8
Rökån	20	12
Rölandaån	12	7.5
Rönnbäcken	20	12
Rönne å	115	71
Rönälven	9	5.6
Rördalsån	17	11
Rörums norra å	11	6.8
Rörums södra å	18	11
Rörvattenån	13	8.1
Rörån	80	50
Rössjöholmsån	35	22
Rösteån	55	34
Röttleån	35	22
Rövran	30	19
Röån	65	40
Röjån	65	40
Röjan	65	40
Röälven	15	9.3
Saankijoki	65	40
Saarilompolonjoki	25	16
Saggån	12	7.5
Sagån	70	43
Saimujoki	30	19
Saittajoki	20	12
Sakajoki	11	6.8
Saksbäcken	14	8.7
Sallsjöån	30	19
Saluån	20	12
Salvijukke	18	11
Sandbyån	13	8.1
Sandbäcken	20	12
Sandserydsån	11	6.8
Sandsjöån	40	25
Sandsjöälven	20	12
Sandvadsbäcken	12	7.5
Sandån	11	6.8
Sangisälven	110	68
Sannarpsån	11	6.8
Sannån		
Sartajåhkå	30	19
Sarvesjåhkå	18	11
Satmyrån	20	12
Satsbäcken	10	6.2
Satsån	30	19
Sattajoki	13	8.1
Sautusjoki	20	12
Saxbroån	17	11
Saxhyttån	20	12
Saxhyttälven	40	25
Saxån	45	28
Saxälven
Siebbjåkkbäcken	25	16
Sege å	50	31
Segerån	12	7.5
Segesholmsån	20	12
Segmoälven	9	5.6
Sekkujoki	45	28
Selakbäcken	25	16
Selsbäcken	17	11
Seltjärnsån		
Selångersån
Semlan	35	22
Semsån		
Sevujoki	40	25
Sexan	50	31
Sidsjöbäcken	7	4.3
Siekajoki	12	7.5
Siekkijoki	16	9.9
Sieperjåhkå	30	19
Sierkajåhka	25	16
Siggarpsån	20	12
Siikajoki	30	19
Sikbäcken	35	22
Sikforsån	35	22
Siksjöbäcken	11	6.8
Sikträskbäcken	15	9.3
Sikträskbäcken	20	12
Sikån	75	47
Silbodalsälven	20	12
Sillbäcken	30	19
Sillerboån	80	50
Silletorpsån	30	19
Silverån	85	53
Silån	25	16
Simeån		
Simontorpsån	20	12
Simsjöån		
Singsån	35	22
Singån	25	16
Sipmekälven	17	11
Sittån	20	12
Sivakkajoki	17	11
Sixån	13	8.1
Sjaunjaätno	90	56
Sjnjuftjutisjåkkå	25	16
Sjoutälven	80	50
Sjulsån	45	28
Sjuskinnån	15	9.3
Sjuströmmar	12	7.5
Själlarimsbäcken	15	9.3
Sjöaredsbäcken	10	6.2
Sjöboån		
Sjöholmsån	12	7.5
Sjömilleån	9	5.6
Sjöris älv		
Sjöråsån	30	19
Skacksjöälven	6	3.7
Skagersholmsån	16	9.9
Skaidejåhkå	16	9.9
Skaitebäcken	17	11
Skallarebäck	16	9.9
Skansnäsån	25	16
Skansån	20	12
Skansån	50	31
Skarendalån	20	12
Skarpån	45	28
Skartajåhka	20	12
Skattmansöån	30	19
Skattån	40	25
Skavebäck	17	11
Skavån		
Skebergaån	14	8.7
Skebokvarnsån	18	11
Skeboån	50	31
Skedviån	40	25
Skellefte River	423	263
Skenaån	25	16
Skeppsbrobäcken	20	12
Skidbäcken	17	11
Skidträskbäcken	12	7.5
Skidträskån	50	31
Skidån	7	4.3
Skieltajåhkå	40	25
Skifteboån	16	9.9
Skikkibäcken	30	19
Skillebyån	12	7.5
Skintan	13	8.1
Skirsjöån	11	6.8
Skirsjöån	20	12
Skivarpsån	25	16
Skiverstadån	16	9.9
Skivsån	12	7.5
Skogträskbäcken	20	12
Skomstjärnån	9	5.6
Skorombäcken		
Skravelbäcken	14	8.7
Skravelån	12	7.5
Skrikviksån	15	9.3
Skräbeån	85	53
Skurdalsån	14	8.7
Skuttran	14	8.7
Skvalån	20	12
Skyllbergsån	30	19
Skymmelån	13	8.1
Skålån	140	87
Skårrån	14	8.7
Skårsälven	11	6.8
Skäppträskån	70	43
Skärboälven	14	8.7
Skärjån	55	34
Skärkan	35	22
Skärshultaån	17	11
Skärvagan	25	16
Skärvagsån	18	11
Skärveteån	45	28
Skärvån	14	8.7
Skärvångsån	30	19
Skärån	20	12
Sköruvjukke	13	8.1
Sladansån	5	3.1
Slagsån	17	11
Slakaån	20	12
Slandromsån	13	8.1
Slevån	15	9.3
Slien	13	8.1
Slipbäcken	25	16
Slipsikån		
Slorudsälven	30	19
Slottsån	45	28
Slumpån	50	31
Slyan	14	8.7
Slåtteån	15	9.3
Slåttån	10	6.2
Slöan	14	8.7
Smedjeån	55	34
Smedsmyrbäcken	12	7.5
Smedstorpsån	40	25
Smygarebäcken	15	9.3
Smålarpsån	20	12
Smörbäcken		
Smörån	18	11
Snoderån	25	16
Snottenån	10	6.2
Snurrijåhka	20	12
Snytsboån	40	25
Snällerödsån	17	11
Snärjebäcken	45	28
Snövlebodaån	35	22
Snöån	40	25
Solbergsån	25	16
Solingsbäcken	16	9.9
Sollumsån	14	8.7
Solviksälven	9	5.6
Solälven	30	19
Sorgån	20	12
Sorkan	13	8.1
Sottujoki	15	9.3
Sotån		
Soukolojoki	45	28
Soutusjoki	20	12
Spannån		
Spikselån	25	16
Spikåsbäcken	20	12
Spikälven	45	28
Spillerbäcken	13	8.1
Spillingsån		
Spjutån	3	1.9
Spångån	4	2.5
Stora Härjån		
Stabäcken	15	9.3
Staddajåhkå	16	9.9
Stadsån	9	5.6
Stalbobäcken	20	12
Stallbackaån	18	11
Stalojåhka	30	19
Stampbäcken	10	6.2
Stampån	20	12
Stamsjöån	70	43
Stantarjåhkå	20	12
Stapuljåhkå	14	8.7
Stavarsjöbäcken	20	12
Staversån	15	9.3
Stavselån	30	19
Stavtjärnån	9	5.6
Stavån	20	12
Stenebyälven	40	25
Stensjöån	20	12
Stensjöån	25	16
Stensån	45	28
Stenträskbäcken	10	6.2
Stenån	12	7.5
Stenån	10	6.2
Stimmerboån	30	19
Stjärnorpebäcken	15	9.3
Stockbäcken	11	6.8
Stockforsälven	35	22
Stocksboån	20	12
Stockån		
Stockälven		
Stor-Fjätan	35	22
Stora Härjeån	20	12
Stora Njupån	16	9.9
Storbodströmmen	90	56
Storbäcken	35	22
Storbäcken	15	9.3
Storbäcken	30	19
Storbäcken	50	31
Storbäcken	18	11
Storbäcken	14	8.7
Storebergsån	20	12
Storforsälven	60	37
Storkvarnbäcken	17	11
Stormyrbäcken	20	12
Storsjöån	12	7.5
Storträskån	20	12
Storvattenån	20	12
Storån	60	37
Storån	20	12
Storån	35	22
Storån	65	40
Storån	70	43
Storälven	11	6.8
Strinneån	20	12
Strulån	10	6.2
Stryån	10	6.2
Stråfulan		
Strågbäcken	10	6.2
Stråån	20	12
Strömarån	35	22
Strömsbäcken	20	12
Strömsån	30	19
Strömsån	20	12
Stupån	17	11
Stutvattenbäcken	20	12
Styggforsån	18	11
Stångsmålaån	20	12
Stångån	185	115
Stödstorpaån	20	12
Stökbäcken	10	6.2
Stöpån		
Stöpälven	20	12
Sudokbäcken	25	16
Suksijoki	20	12
Sularpsbäcken	11	6.8
Suledsälven	7	4.3
Sulsjöån	8	5.0
Sulån	25	16
Sundsbyälven	17	11
Sundstorpsån	15	9.3
Sundströmmen	10	6.2
Sundträskbäcken	13	8.1
Sunnanån		
Sunnerstaån		
Sunnån	20	12
Sunnäsån	17	11
Suobbat-Tjåhka	30	19
Suoinakjåhkå	40	25
Suoksaurebäcken	20	12
Suolojåhkå	17	11
Suopatusjoki	16	9.9
Suoppetjukke	11	6.8
Surrebäcken	20	12
Surtan	40	25
Suseån	50	31
Suvijoki	30	19
Svalesjåhkå	18	11
Svaltjajåhkå	11	6.8
Svanavattenån	14	8.7
Svanforsbäcken	12	7.5
Svaningsån	50	31
Svanån	25	16
Svanån	10	6.2
Svartabäcken	30	19
Svartbäcken	14	8.7
Svartijåhkå	35	22
Svartsjöån		
Svartån	15	9.3
Svartån	20	12
Svartån	165	103
Svartån	30	19
Svartån	90	56
Svartån	55	34
Svartån	16	9.9
Svartån	11	6.8
Svartån	22	14
Svartälven
Svedjeån	18	11
Svedån	17	11
Svensbyån	30	19
Svenstaån	25	16
Sverkestaån	90	56
Sverkojåhkå	17	11
Sviestadsån	50	31
Svinabäcken	12	7.5
Svintunaån	9	5.6
Svinån	10	6.2
Svärdälven	40	25
Svärtaån	40	25
Syväjoki	15	9.3
Sågbäcken	18	11
Sågån	9	5.6
Sågån	8	5.0
Sålnen	40	25
Sångan	20	12
Sångesälven		
Sånghusån	20	12
Sällerhögsån	11	6.8
Sällevadsån	30	19
Sälmån	17	11
Sälsjöbäcken	13	8.1
Sämsjöån	45	28
Sännan	25	16
Sännån	45	28
Särkijoki	17	11
Särkån		
Särvan	55	34
Säsån	7	4.3
Sätersälven	16	9.9
Sätraån	20	12
Sävarån	140	87
Sävastabäcken	10	6.2
Sävaån	45	28
Säveån	130	81
Sävjaån	50	31
Sävsjöbäcken	13	8.1
Sävsjöån	20	12
Sävälven	30	19
Säxån	14	8.7
Sääjoki	20	12
Söderedeån	11	6.8
Söderhamnsån		
Söderköpingsån	80	50
Söderträskbäcken	17	11
Söderängsån	11	6.8
Södra Anundsjöån	65	40
Sör-Lillån	75	47
Sörbyån	12	7.5
Sörjabäcken	11	6.8
Sörmjöleån	25	16
Sörviksån	20	12
Sörån	30	19
Sörån	25	16
Sösjöbäcken	13	8.1
Sösjöån	14	8.7
Söån	20	12
Tabergsån	35	22
Takajoki	30	19
Tallån	35	22
Tallåsbäcken	16	9.9
Talvatissjöbäcken	15	9.3
Tandlaån	25	16
Tandsjöån	13	8.1
Tandån	20	12
Tangån	30	19
Tannbäcken	25	16
Tansbäcken	15	9.3
Tansån	16	9.9
Tanumsälven		
Tarfalajåhka	11	6.8
Tarmsälven	30	19
Taruantojoki	55	34
Tarån	20	12
Taske å	12	7.5
Tassbyälven	15	9.3
Tavelån	65	40
Tegabäcken	18	11
Tegelsmoraån	9	5.6
Telebäcken	50	31
Teletöisenjoki	16	9.9
Temminkijoki	11	6.8
Tengeliönjoki	125	78
Tennan	40	25
Tenningån	25	16
Tertojåhka	50	31
Testeboån	110	68
Teurajoki	70	43
Tevån	18	11
Tidan	185	115
Timsån	11	6.8
Timsälven	125	78
Tingsjöån	20	12
Tingvastobäcken	18	11
Tingån		
Tinnerbäcken	18	11
Tivsjöån	25	16
Tiån	14	8.7
Tjaktjaurälven	30	19
Tjartsebäcken	18	11
Tjatitjjåhkå	20	12
Tjatsvaggejåhkå	20	12
Tjautjerbäcken	18	11
Tjengaljåhkå	17	11
Tjeurajåhkå	18	11
Tjidtjajåhkå	30	19
Tjipkobäcken	13	8.1
Tjulån	40	25
Tjuoltajåhkå	30	19
Tjuonavaggejåhka	14	8.7
Tjuoukutimjåhkå	16	9.9
Tjutebäcken	11	6.8
Tjålojåhka	14	8.7
Tjåterbäcken	20	12
Tjäpsjukke	15	9.3
Tjärekullaån	20	12
Tjärngetbäcken	13	8.1
Tjärnsälven	45	28
Tjörningabäcken	13	8.1
Tobyälven	18	11
Toftaån	9	5.6
Tolitaälven	25	16
Tolkbäcken	17	11
Tolkkijoki	25	16
Tommarpaån	45	28
Torasjoki	15	9.3
Torisbäcken	11	6.8
Torne	545	339
Torpabäcken	20	12
Torpaån	20	12
Torpedalsälven	20	12
Torpån	20	12
Torrebergabäcken	14	8.7
Torrfinnån		
Torsbäcken	16	9.9
Torshagsån	14	8.7
Torsjöån	20	12
Torsmovasseln	13	8.1
Torvsjöån	40	25
Torvån	12	7.5
Torån	20	12
Toskbäcken	16	9.9
Tranebergsälven	25	16
Trankvillsån	20	12
Trinnan	18	11
Trollbosjöån	10	6.2
Trosaån	70	43
Trosbyån	17	11
Tryssjöbäcken	13	8.1
Trändeån	40	25
Träppjaån	20	12
Trödjeån	20	12
Trönningeån	11	6.8
Trösälven	35	22
Tsåkaurjåhkå	12	7.5
Tukijåhkå	25	16
Tullstorpsån	20	12
Tulusjoki	11	6.8
Tumbaån	16	9.9
Tunaån	70	43
Tunnersjöbäcken	25	16
Tuoljebäcken	20	12
Tuolpukkajoki	12	7.5
Tuorpunjåhkå	20	12
Tuortapebäcken	18	11
Tupojoki	25	16
Turingeån	25	16
Tutturjåhka	17	11
Tuvattsån	13	8.1
Tuvebäcken	14	8.7
Tvååkers kanal	20	12
Tväringsån	20	12
Tvärlikan	14	8.7
Tvärån	8	5.0
Tvärån	17	11
Tvärån	9	5.6
Tvärån	13	8.1
Tvärån	16	9.9
Tvärån	40	25
Tvärån	20	12
Tvärån	8	5.0
Tvärån	13	8.1
Tvärån	30	19
Tvärån	14	8.7
Tvärån	35	22
Tvärån	115	71
Tvärälven	30	19
Tvärälven	17	11
Tynnsån	25	16
Tyresån	30	19
Tåmälven	40	25
Tångsån	30	19
Tångån	14	8.7
Tåsan	45	28
Täckelån	20	12
Täfteån	45	28
Täftån	16	9.9
Tälgslättån	45	28
Täljareån	8	5.0
Täljeån	20	12
Tällvattsbäcken	30	19
Tällån	16	9.9
Tämnarån	100	62
Tängvattsbäcken	35	22
Tännån	65	40
Tärendöälven	50	31
Tärnaån	75	47
Tärnickån	17	11
Töftedalsån	40	25
Töjsan	20	12
Töreälven	75	47
Törlan	20	12
Törnaån	10	6.2
Törnan	9	5.6
Uddbäcken	10	6.2
Udtjabäcken	45	28
Udtjajåhkå	20	12
Ugan	18	11
Uggelforsån	15	9.3
Ukerån	12	7.5
Ullersjöbäcken	10	6.2
Ullersättersbäcken	16	9.9
Ullnaån	6	3.7
Ullångsån	30	19
Ulvsnäsabäcken	14	8.7
Ulvån	12	7.5
Ume River	477	296
Unnan	50	31
Upmasjåhkå	35	22
Upperudsälven	145	90
Urstjärnälven	25	16
Urtomanjoki	18	11
Utansjöån	30	19
Utbyån	9	5.6
Utsulån		
Utterbäcken	11	6.8
Utterån	60	37
Uvan
Uvån	90	56
Vadbäcken	9	5.6
Vadsbäcken	20	12
Vadstorpån	20	12
Vadälven	8	5.0
Vaggeälven	90	56
Vagnboströmmen	15	9.3
Vaijajoki	20	12
Vaikkojoki	25	16
Vajbäcken	40	25
Vakran	20	12
Vaksjöbäcken	17	11
Valasjåhkå	12	7.5
Valburån	18	11
Valkanjaurbäcken	15	9.3
Vallasån	14	8.7
Vallbyån	35	22
Valldroån	16	9.9
Vallmoraån	15	9.3
Vallsjöån	13	8.1
Valsjöbäcken	13	8.1
Valtajåhkå	30	19
Valtiojoki	45	28
Valundabäcken	11	6.8
Valvattenbäcken	14	8.7
Valån	30	19
Vammarsmålaån	13	8.1
Vandelnån	7	4.3
Vannstadån	20	12
Vanån	140	87
Vapsajåhkå	30	19
Vapstälven	100	62
Varaån	14	8.7
Varjisån
Varnan	20	12
Varån	50	31
Vasejåhka	25	16
Vasksjöån		
Vassaraälven	45	28
Vassbäcksån	11	6.8
Vassjöån	20	12
Vasslen	12	7.5
Vathanjoki	20	12
Vattenån	20	12
Vaxsjöån	25	16
Vebomarksån	20	12
Vegan	15	9.3
Vege å	50	31
Veksjöbäcken	12	7.5
Veksjöån		
Velångsbäcken	17	11
Veman	100	62
Vendelån		
Venetjoki	40	25
Vepmemokbäcken	13	8.1
Verbobäcken	30	19
Verkanbäcken	14	8.7
Verkarskogsbäcken	10	6.2
Verkasjoki	20	12
Verkaån	30	19
Verkebäcksån	20	12
Verkmyrån	10	6.2
Verkälven	11	6.8
Vervelån		
Vessingeån	18	11
Vetlandabäcken	11	6.8
Vibybäcken	20	12
Vibäckabäcken	10	6.2
Vidboån	17	11
Videbäck	20	12
Viejejåhkå	18	11
Viejeströmmen	30	19
Viepsajåhkå	20	12
Vierrojåhkå	12	7.5
Vierydsån	40	25
Vietasätno	110	68
Vieån	30	19
Vigdan	25	16
Viggan	30	19
Vikan	45	28
Vikarälven	20	12
Vikeväjoki	20	12
Viksjöån	20	12
Vilshultsån	25	16
Vimleån	20	12
Vindel River	467	290
Vindån	40	25
Vingån	10	6.2
Vinne å	30	19
Vinån	20	12
Virkesjöbäcken	12	7.5
Virtajåhkå	15	9.3
Virån	65	40
Visjöån	30	19
Viskan	140	87
Viskansbäcken	13	8.1
Viskebäcken	16	9.9
Visman	35	22
Vispolenån	13	8.1
Vissjöån		
Vistbäcken	35	22
Vistån	90	56
Vitbäcken	70	43
Vitsandsälven	25	16
Vittanbäcken	20	12
Vittangiälven	125	78
Vittankijoki	18	11
Vitträskbäcken	18	11
Vitån	85	53
Vojmån	225	140
Vormbäcken	50	31
Voxnan	195	121
Vramsån	55	34
Vrangsjöbäcken	11	6.8
Vretaån	20	12
Vrångsälven	65	40
Vrångån	17	11
Vuoiturjåhka	20	12
Vuokkasenjoki	25	16
Vuolejaurbäcken	11	6.8
Vuolgamjaurbäcken	10	6.2
Vuolusjåhka	35	22
Vuomajoki	20	12
Vuomajåhka	20	12
Vuononoja	16	9.9
Vuoskojåhka	13	8.1
Vuoskonjåhkå	20	12
Vuoskujoki	20	12
Vuosmajåhkå	25	16
Vuostojoki	30	19
Vuotkajåhka	20	12
Vuotnajåhka	45	28
Vuottasbäcken	20	12
Vuoulajåhkå	20	12
Vuovosjukke	40	25
Vutnesjjåhkå	20	12
Vådån	12	7.5
Vågsjöån		
Vågträskbäcken	25	16
Vålvasslan	11	6.8
Våmån	40	25
Vångan	10	6.2
Vårträskbäcken	12	7.5
Våsån	14	8.7
Våtsjöån	8	5.0
Vägån	20	12
Vähäjoki	15	9.3
Väktarån	20	12
Väla å	20	12
Välabäcken	14	8.7
Vällingbäcken	10	6.2
Vällingån	30	19
Vällån	11	6.8
Vämmesån	18	11
Vängelälven	40	25
Vänjaurbäcken	35	22
Vänneån	25	16
Värnaån	30	19
Värån	20	12
Väster-Henan		
Västerdalälven	315	196
Västerhocklan	18	11
Västerån	30	19
Västerån	30	19
Västnårån	25	16
Västra Dalkarlsån	30	19
Västra Jolen	20	12
Västrakullabäcken	20	12
Vävelsjöån	13	8.1
Växan	18	11
Växboån	14	8.7
Väärtioja	16	9.9
Vökarbäcken	14	8.7
Yabergsån	18	11
Yan	30	19
Ybbarpsån	25	16
Ycklan	30	19
Ylijoki	13	8.1
Ylinen Kihlankijoki	20	12
Ylinen Surujoki	30	19
Ylläsjoki	60	37
Ysjöälven	20	12
Ytterån	80	50

== See also ==
- Baltic Sea
- Kattegat
- Islands of Sweden
- Geography of Sweden
