= Idbyån =

River on the east coast of Sweden

Location
- Country: Sweden
- County: Västernorrland

Physical characteristics
- Mouth: Gulf of Bothnia
  - coordinates: 63°17′23″N 18°52′45″E
  - elevation: 0 m (0 ft)
- Length: 40 km (25 mi)
- Basin size: 222.4 km^{2} (85.9 sq mi)

Idbyån is a river in northern Sweden.

== See also ==
- List of rivers of Sweden
