= Miellätno =

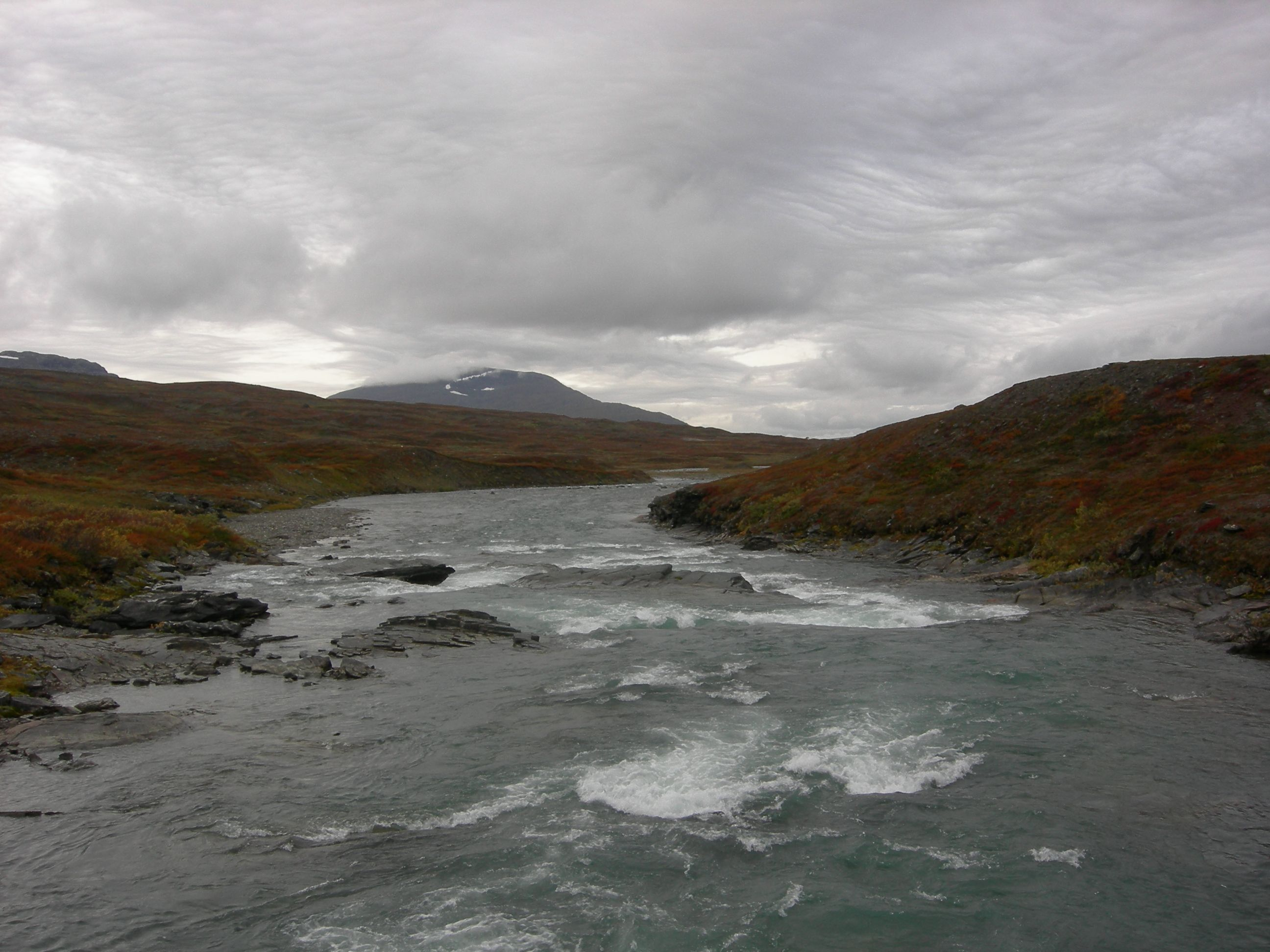

Location
- Country: Sweden
- County: Norrbotten County

Physical characteristics
- Source: Alkajaure
  - coordinates: 67°20′10″N 17°12′16″E
  - elevation: 756 m (2,480 ft)
- Mouth: Virihaure
  - coordinates: 67°23′22″N 16°48′05″E
  - elevation: 579 m (1,900 ft)
- Length: 30 km (19 mi)

Miellätno is a river in northern Sweden.
