= Testeboån =

Coordinates: 60.70715°N 17.15393°E

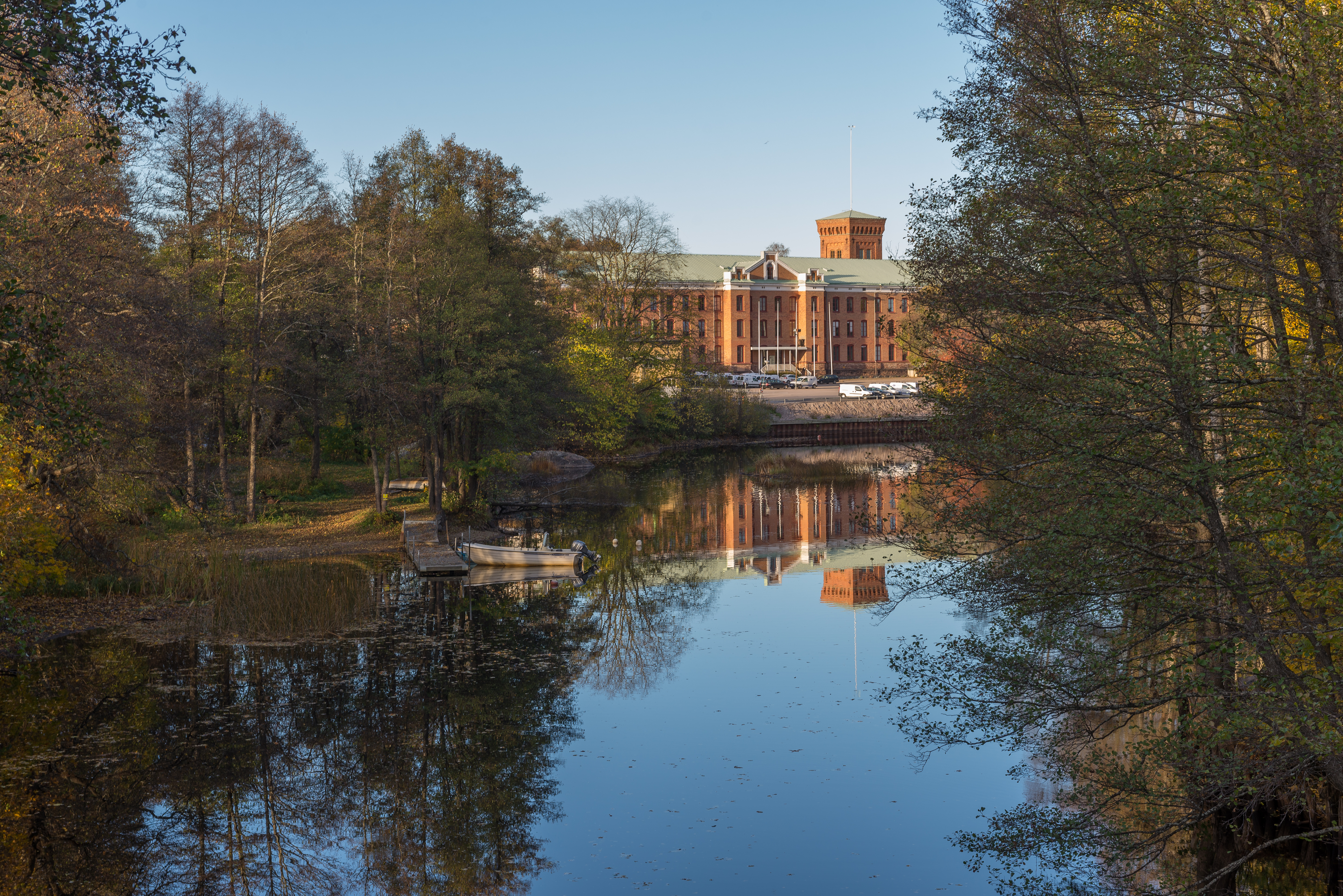

Location
- Country: Sweden

Physical characteristics
- Length: 110 km (68 mi)
- Basin size: 1,111.8 km^{2} (429.3 sq mi)
- Discharge
  - average: 11.7 m^{3}/s (410 cu ft/s)

Testeboån is a river in Sweden.
