= Vindån =

Coordinates: 58°02′N 16°39′E

Location
- Country: Sweden

Physical characteristics
- Basin size: 303.5 km^{2} (117.2 sq mi)

Vindån is a river in Sweden.
