= Örekilsälven =

Coordinates: 58.44968°N 11.68902°E

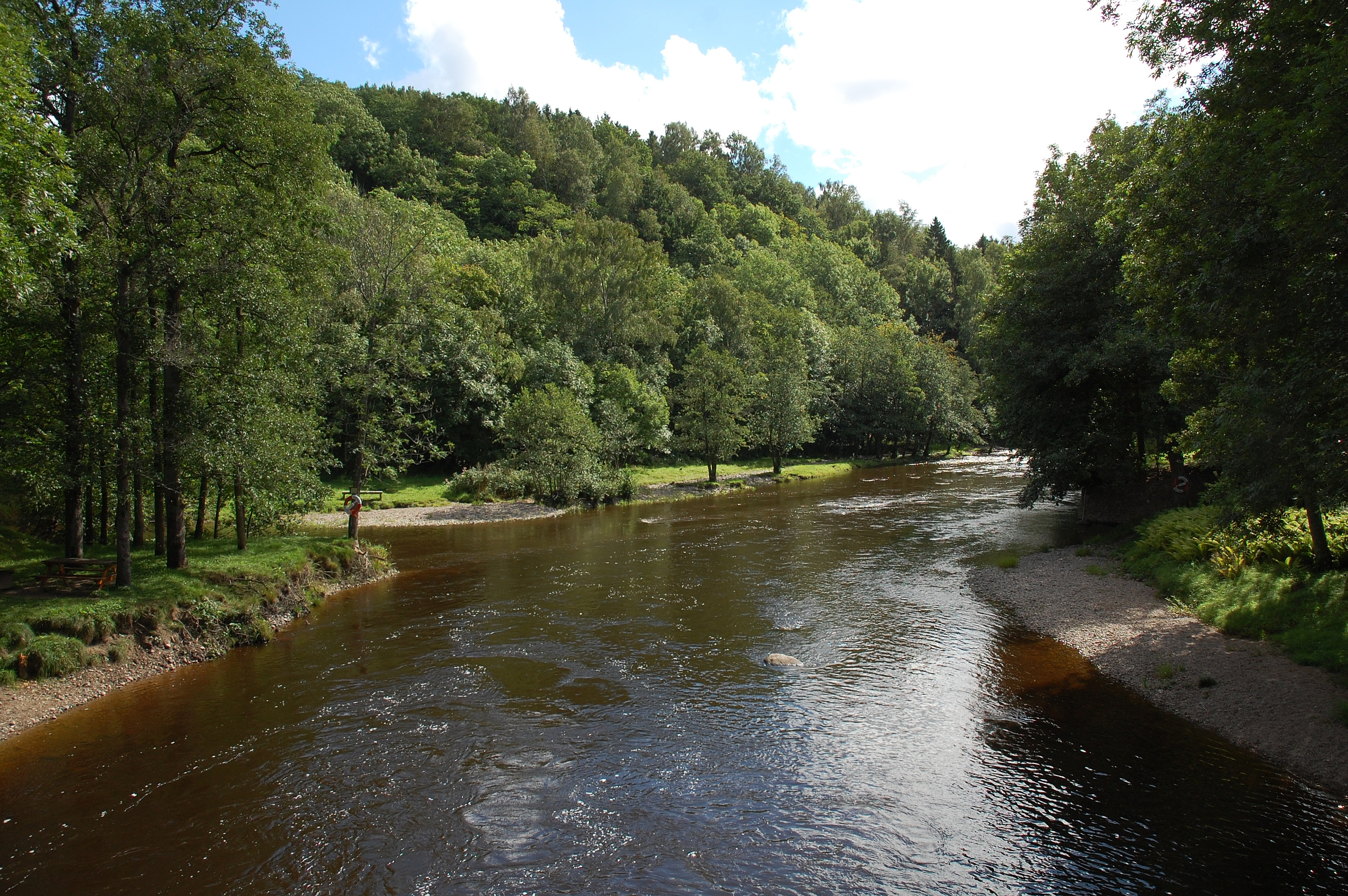

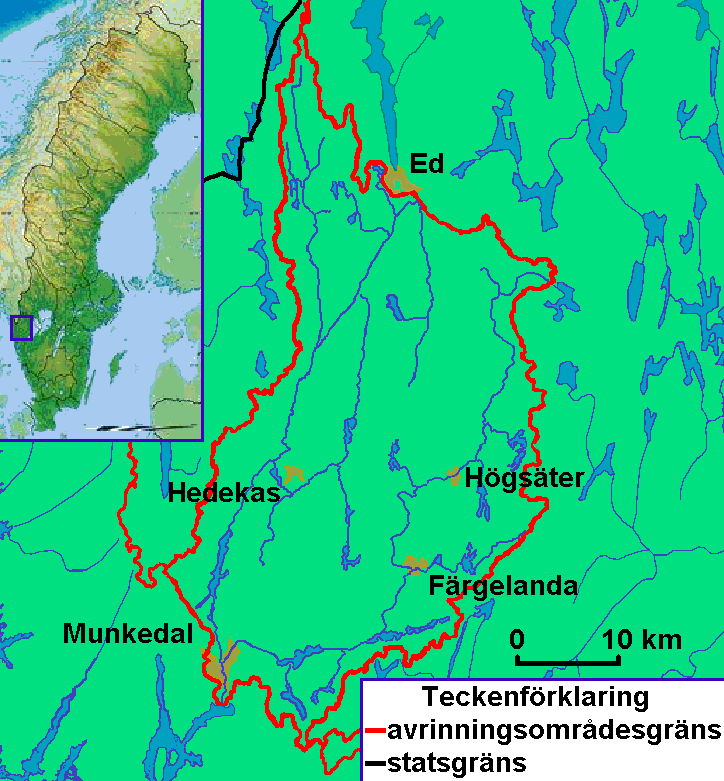
- Map of Örekilsälven's drainage basin

Location
- Country: Sweden
- County: Västra Götaland

Physical characteristics
- Length: 70 km (43 mi)
- Basin size: 1,340.2 km^{2} (517.5 sq mi)
- Discharge
  - average: 22 m^{3}/s (780 cu ft/s)

Örekilsälven is a river in Sweden.

Across Örekilsälven at Kviström in Munkedal
