= Nybroån =

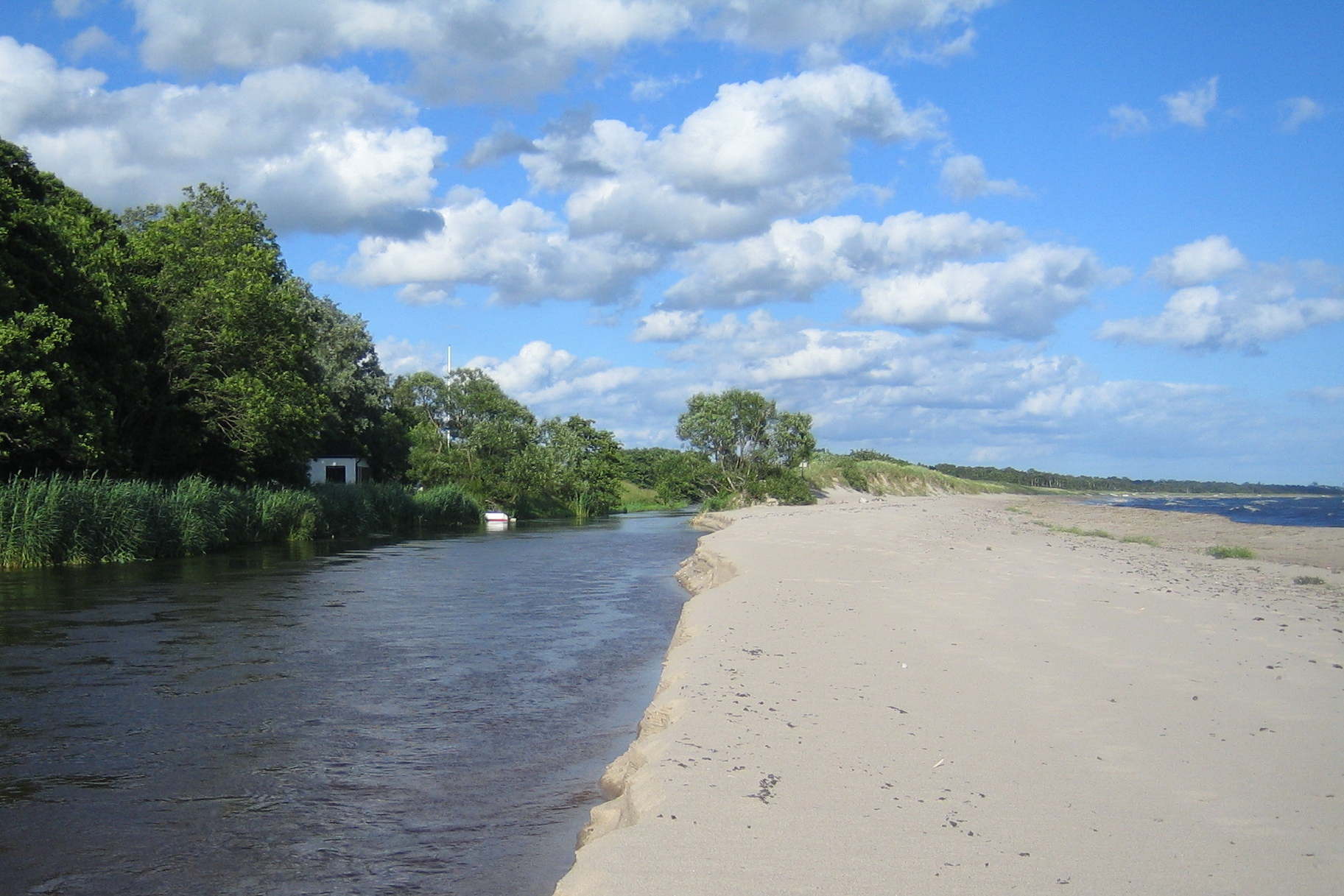

Location
- Country: Sweden
- County: Skåne

Physical characteristics
- Mouth: Baltic Sea
  - location: Nybrostrand, Ystad Municipality
  - coordinates: 55°26′05″N 13°54′40″E
  - elevation: 0 m (0 ft)
- Length: 40 km (25 mi)
- Basin size: 315.8 km^{2} (121.9 sq mi)

Nybroån is a river in Sweden.
