= Strömsån =

Coordinates: 58.93986°N 11.17684°E

Location
- Country: Sweden

Physical characteristics
- Length: 30 km (19 mi)
- Basin size: 256.3 km^{2} (99.0 sq mi)

Strömsån is a river in Sweden. The river is 30 kilometres (19 mi) long and has a basin with area of 256 square kilometres (99 sq mi). At the mouth of the river lies the city of Strömstad, Bohuslän.
