= Storån =

Coordinates: 58°00′00″N 16°30′21″E

Location
- Country: Sweden

Physical characteristics
- Basin size: 522.1 km^{2} (201.6 sq mi)

Storån is a river in Sweden.
