= Stensån =

River in Sweden

Coordinates: 56.43245°N 12.87524°E

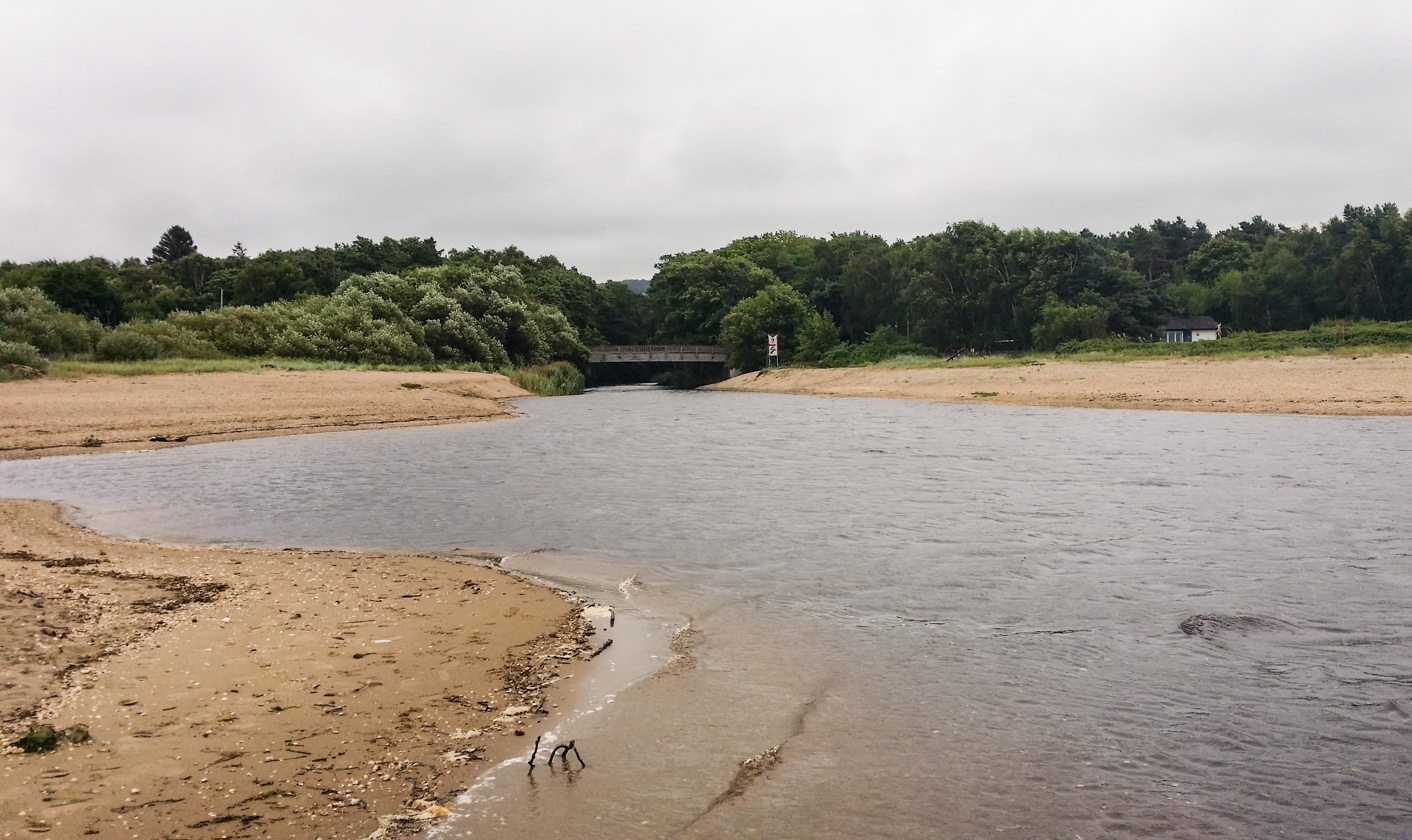

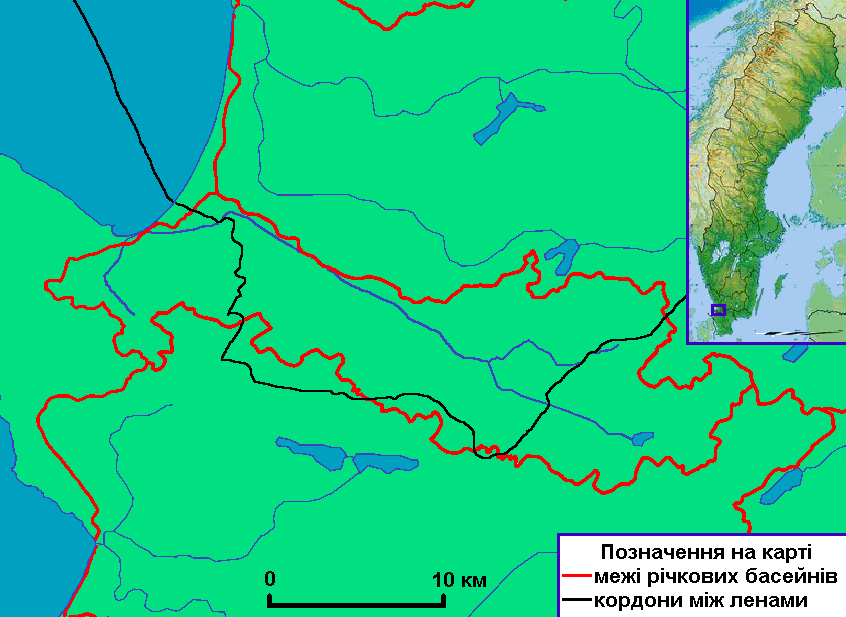
- Map of Stensån's drainage basin.

Location
- Country: Sweden

Physical characteristics
- Basin size: 284.5 km^{2} (109.8 sq mi)

Stensån is a river in Sweden.
