= Sege River =

Coordinates: 55.61688°N 13.09650°E

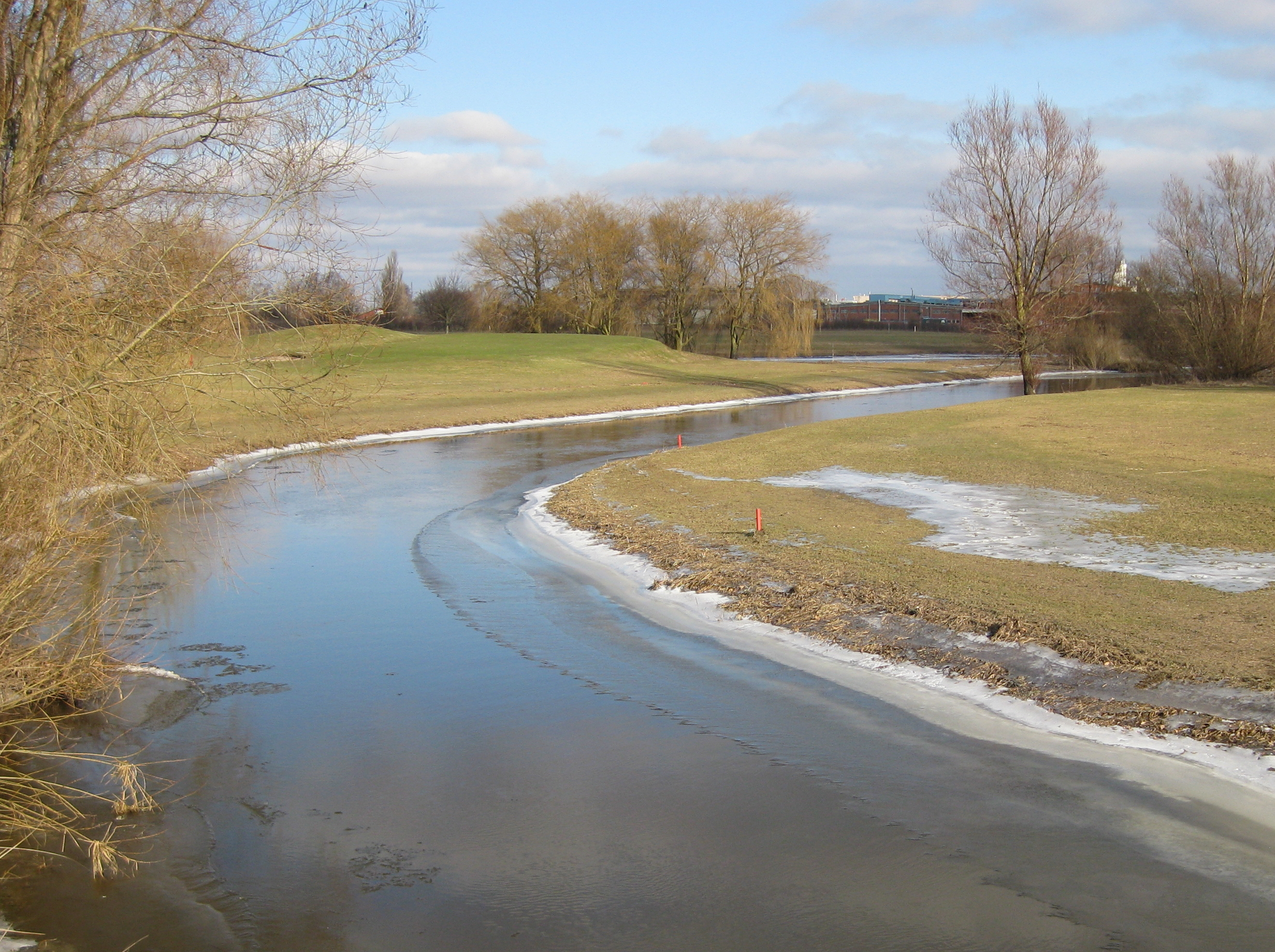
- Native name: Sege å (Swedish)

Location
- Country: Sweden
- County: Skåne

Physical characteristics
- Length: 40 km (25 mi)
- Basin size: 334.4 km^{2} (129.1 sq mi)

Sege River (Swedish: Sege å) is a river in Sweden.
