= Norralaån =

Coordinates: 61.35715°N 16.99593°E

Location
- Country: Sweden
- County: Gävleborg

Physical characteristics
- Length: 40 km (25 mi)
- Basin size: 319.3 km^{2} (123.3 sq mi)

Norralaån is a river in Hälsingland, Sweden.
