= Bräkneån =

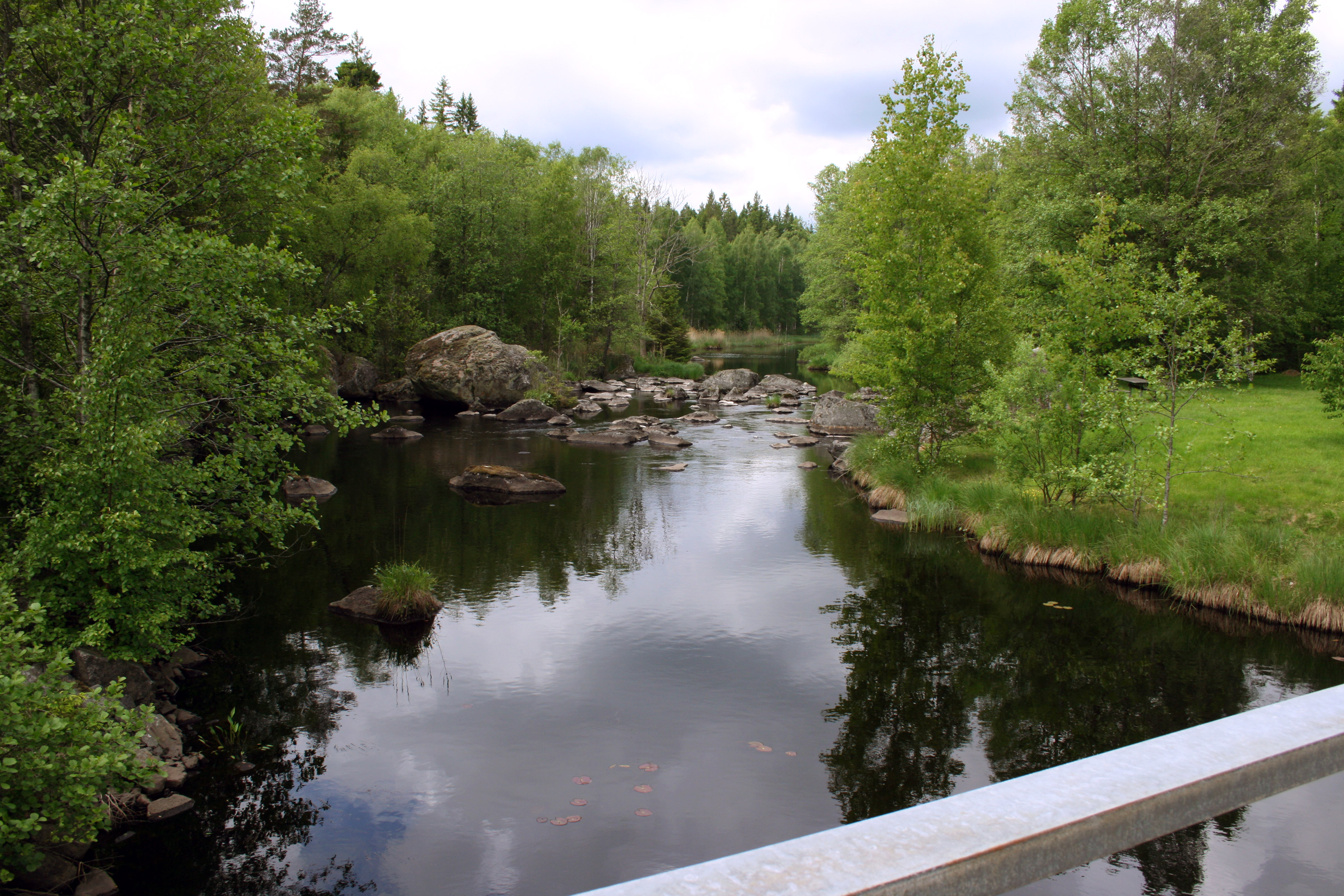
- Bräkneån in southern Småland, where it is intersected by Highway 29.

Location
- Country: Sweden

Physical characteristics
- Mouth: Baltic Sea
  - coordinates: 56°10′10″N 15°07′23″E
  - elevation: 0 m (0 ft)
- Length: 84 km (52 mi)
- Basin size: 462.3 km^{2} (178.5 sq mi)

Bräkneån is a river in southern Smaland and Blekinge, Sweden, which runs through Tingsryd and Ronneby municipalities. The river's total length is 84 km, catchment area about 460 km^{2} (180 sq mi). Bräkneån from Fish Lake City (136 m (446 ft) AMSL) in southern Småland, Tingsryd, Kronoberg County, and winds about four miles to the lake Ygden in the south (129 m (423 ft) AMSL). From Ygden go Bräkneån via Tingsryd to the lake Tiken (125 m (410 ft) AMSL) and then reaches Blekinge. (A rest stop at Bräkneån found along Highway 29, just before the Bay Area). In Blekinge passed including the village Bälganet and agglomeration Bräkne-Hoby at E22 before Bräkneån eventually flows into the Baltic Sea at Väby.

A film about Bräkneån and people in the river valley was shown on BBC1 in early 2004.
