= Forsmarksån =

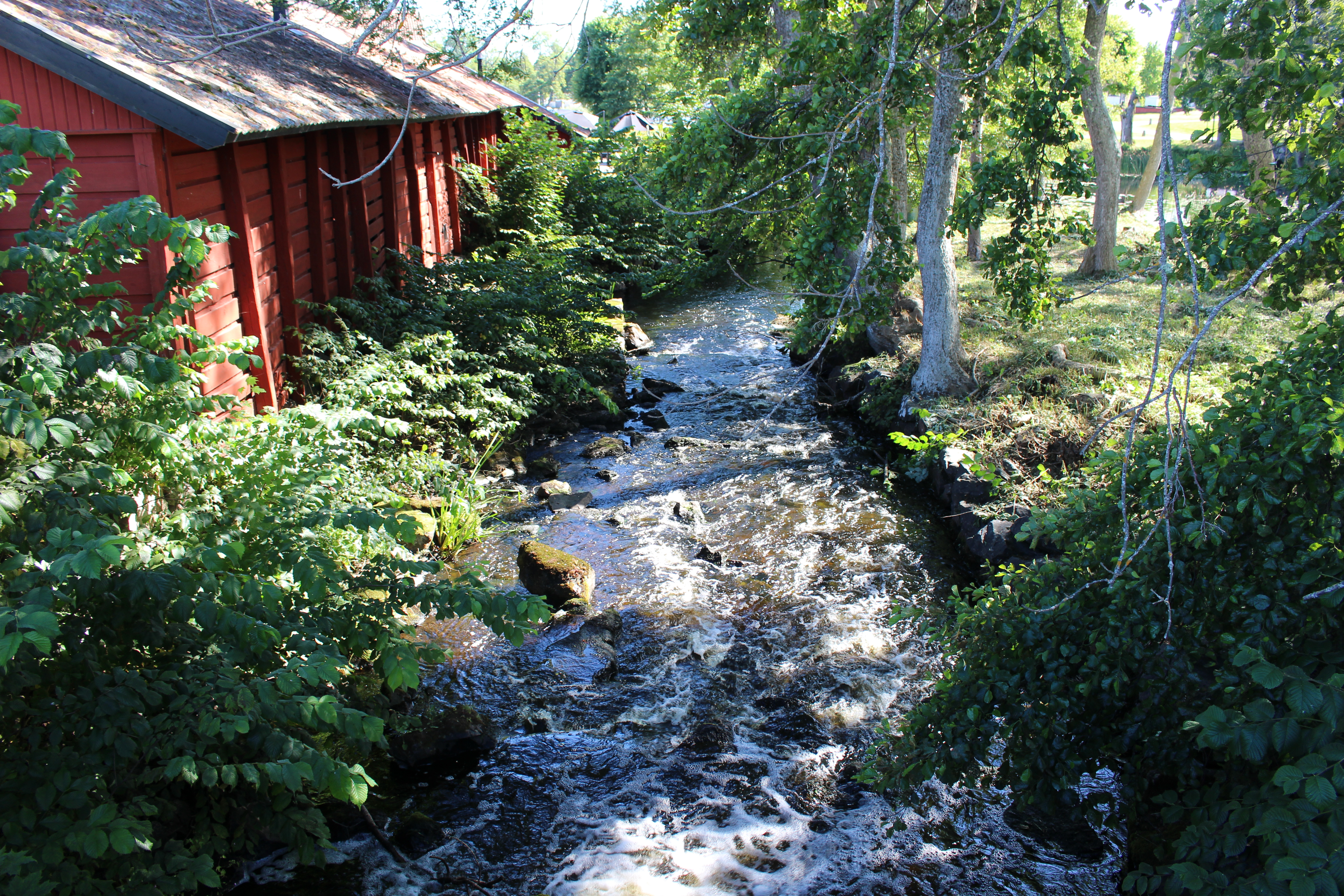

Location
- Country: Sweden
- County: Uppsala

Physical characteristics
- Mouth: Öregrundsgrepen
  - coordinates: 60°20′28″N 18°14′00″E
  - elevation: 0 m (0 ft)
- Length: 10 km (6.2 mi)
- Basin size: 375.5 km^{2} (145.0 sq mi)
- Discharge
  - average: 2.8 m^{3}/s (99 cu ft/s)

The Forsmarksån is a river in Sweden.
