= Ljungby River =

River in Sweden

- Native name: Ljungbyån (Swedish)

Location
- Country: Sweden

Physical characteristics
- Mouth: Kalmar Strait
  - coordinates: 56°37′35″N 16°14′40″E
  - elevation: 0 m (0 ft)
- Length: 62 km (39 mi)
- Basin size: 757.8 km^{2} (292.6 sq mi)

Ljungby River (Swedish: Ljungbyån) is a river in Sweden. The 62-km (39 mi) long river empties into the Kalmar Strait.
