= Skeboån =

Coordinates: 60°03′N 18°35′E

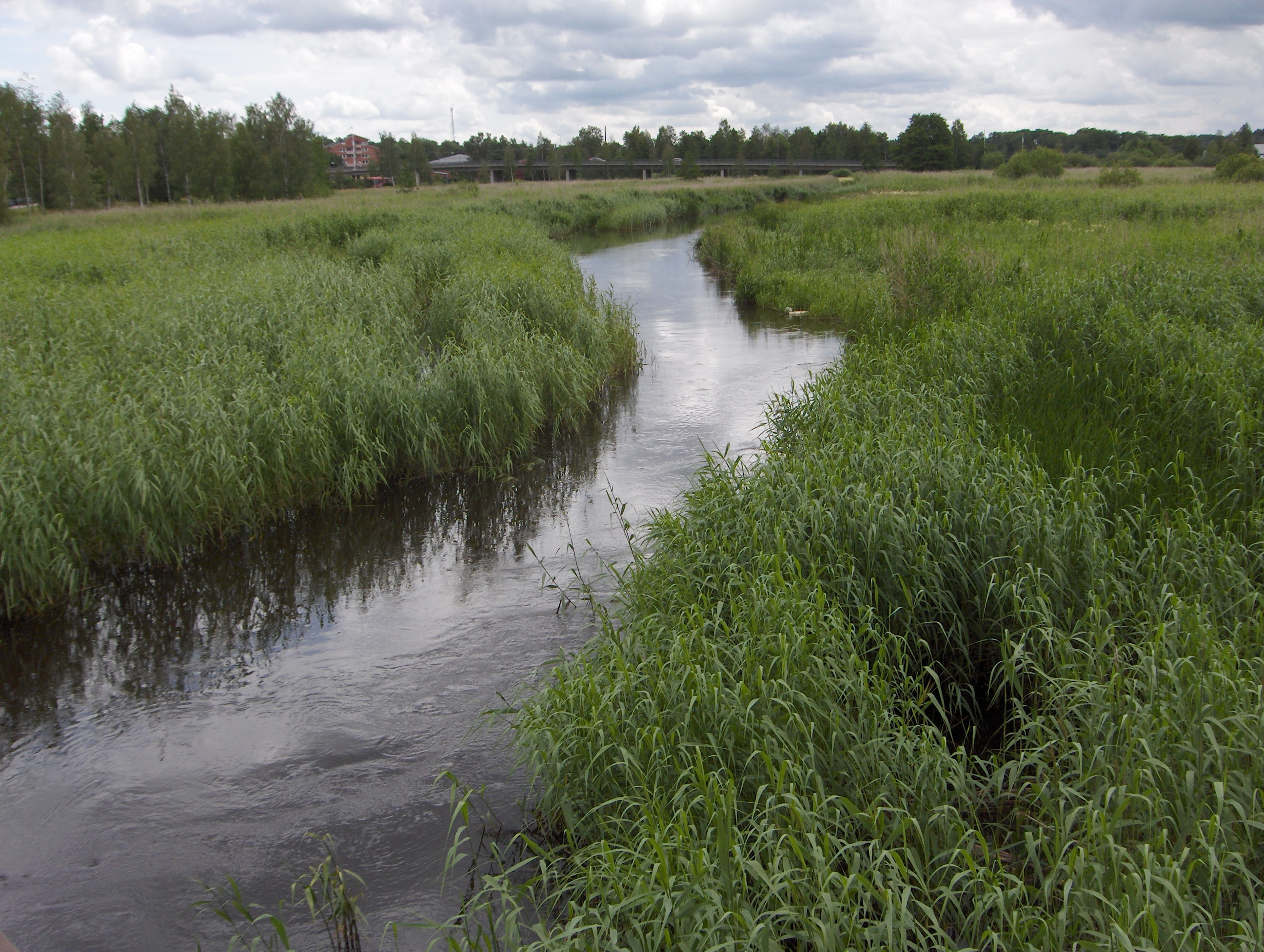

Location
- Country: Sweden

Physical characteristics
- Length: 53 km (33 mi)
- Basin size: 482.8 km^{2} (186.4 sq mi)

Skeboån is a river in Sweden.
