= Gnarpsån =

Location
- Country: Sweden
- County: Gävleborg

Physical characteristics
- Mouth
  - coordinates: 62°01′42″N 17°25′45″E
- Length: 40 km (25 mi)
- Basin size: 228.8 km^{2} (88.3 sq mi)

Gnarpsån is a river in Sweden.
