= Hagbyån =

Location
- Country: Sweden
- County: Kalmar

Physical characteristics
- Mouth: Kalmar Strait
  - coordinates: 56°31′47″N 16°11′28″E
- Basin size: 467.9 km^{2} (180.7 sq mi)

Hagbyån is a river in Sweden, in eastern Småland.
