= Virån =

Coordinates: 57°19′49″N 16°31′59″E

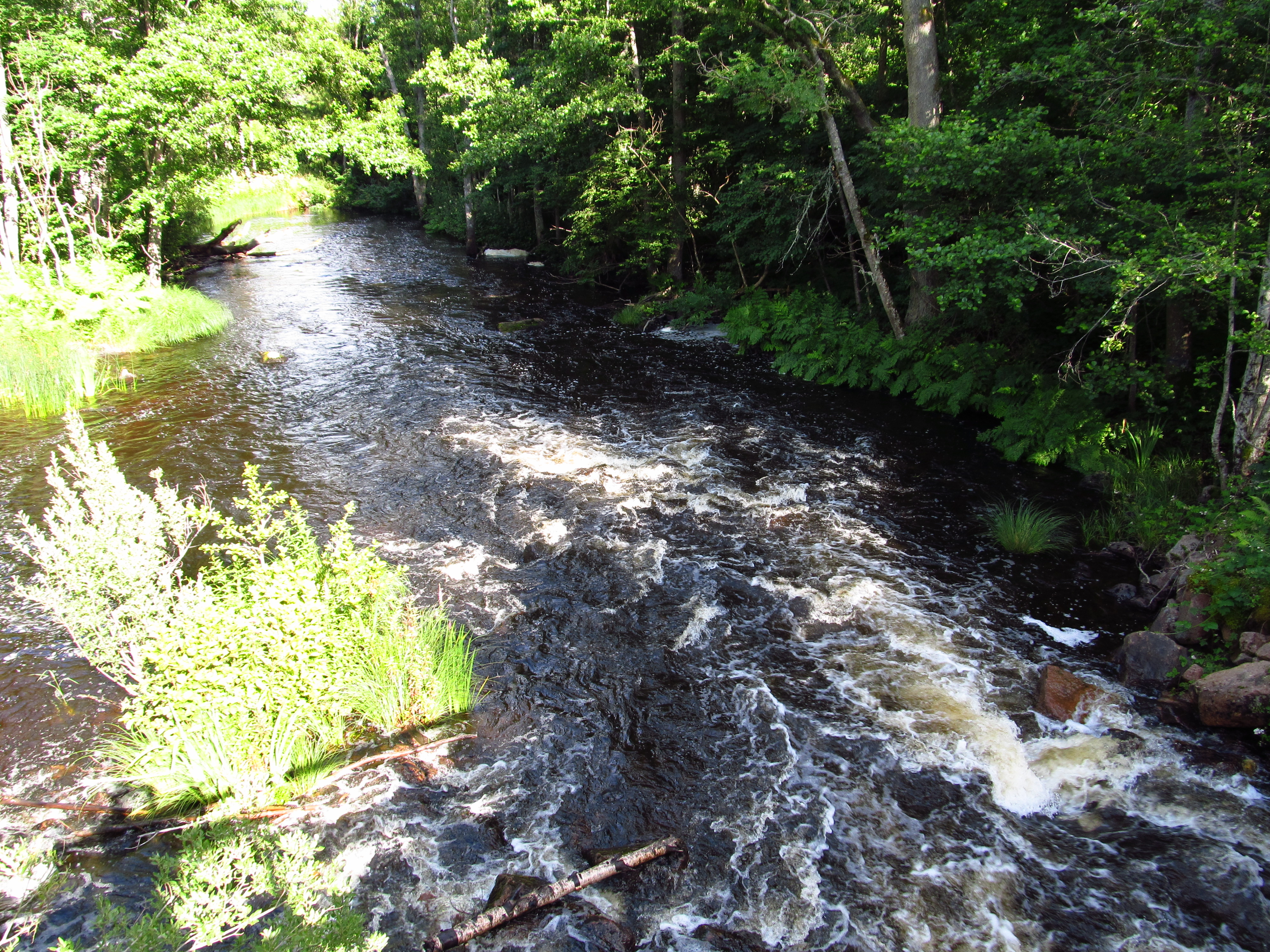

Location
- Country: Sweden
- County: Kalmar
- Municipality: Oskarshamn

Physical characteristics
- Basin size: 588.2 km^{2} (227.1 sq mi)

Virån is a river in Sweden.
