= Hamrångeån =

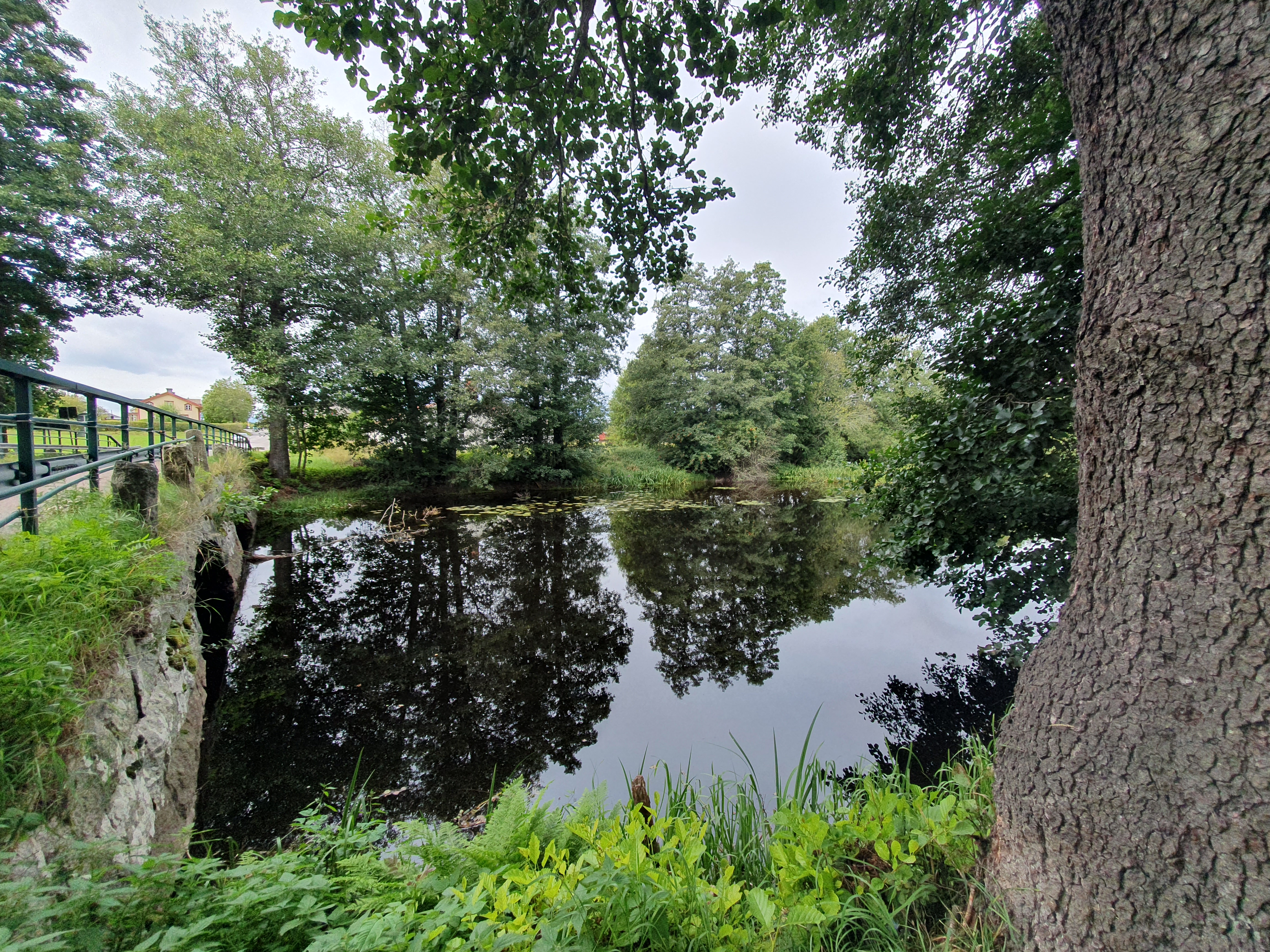

Location
- Country: Sweden
- County: Gävleborg

Physical characteristics
- Mouth
  - location: Hamrångefjärden
  - coordinates: 60°54′09″N 17°04′43″E
- Length: 10 km (6.2 mi)
- Basin size: 517.9 km^{2} (200.0 sq mi)

Hamrångeån is a river in Sweden.
