= Jävre River =

- Native name: Jävreån (Swedish)

Location
- Country: Sweden

Physical characteristics
- Mouth: Bothnian Bay
  - coordinates: 65°08′30″N 21°30′30″E
  - elevation: 0 m (0 ft)
- Length: 25 km (16 mi)
- Basin size: 195.7 km^{2} (75.6 sq mi)

Jävre River (Swedish: Jävreån) is a river in Sweden.
