= Gådeån =

Coordinates: 62°37′N 17°54′E

Location
- Country: Sweden
- County: Västernorrland

Physical characteristics
- Length: 45 km (28 mi)
- Basin size: 292.7 km^{2} (113.0 sq mi)

Gådeån is a river in Sweden.
