= Rosån =

Coordinates: 58°01′N 12°13′E

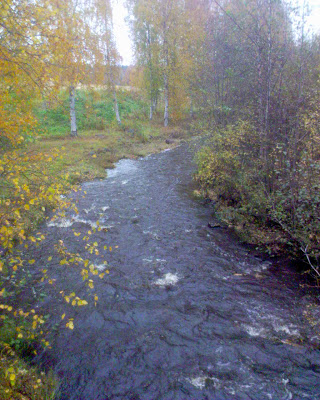

Location
- Country: Sweden
- County: Norrbotten
- Municipalities: Luleå, Piteå

Physical characteristics
- Length: 30 km (19 mi)
- Basin size: 196.8 km^{2} (76.0 sq mi)

Rosån is a river in Sweden.
