= Olandsån =

River in Uppsala County, Sweden

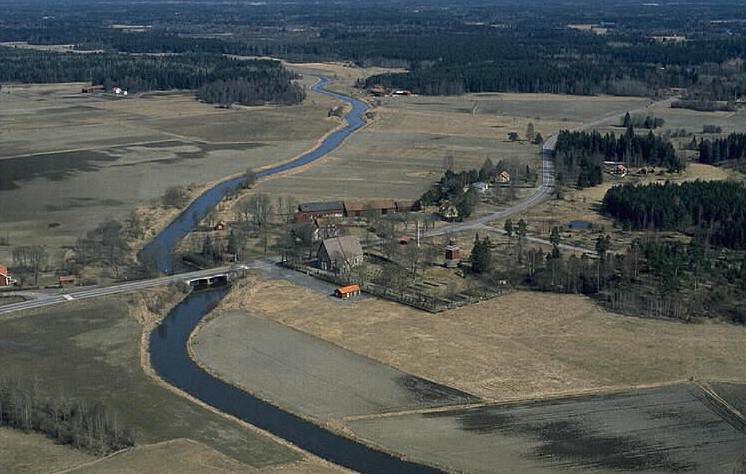

Location
- Country: Sweden
- County: Uppsala

Physical characteristics
- Mouth
  - coordinates: 60°19′54″N 18°14′27″E
- Length: 65 km (40 mi)
- Basin size: 880.9 km^{2} (340.1 sq mi)
- Discharge
  - average: 6 m^{3}/s (210 cu ft/s)

The Olandsån is a river in Sweden.
