= Sangis River =

Coordinates: 65.84681°N 23.50152°E

- Native name: Sangisälven (Swedish); Sangis älv (Swedish)

Location
- Country: Sweden
- County: Norrbotten

Physical characteristics
- Length: 109 km (68 mi)
- Basin size: 1,230.0 km^{2} (474.9 sq mi)

Sangis River (Swedish: Sangisälven or Sangis älv) is a river in Norrbotten in Sweden.
