= Marströmmen =

Coordinates: 57.5809°N 16.5218°E

Location
- Country: Sweden
- County: Kalmar

Physical characteristics
- Basin size: 496.1 km^{2} (191.5 sq mi)

Marströmmen is a river in Sweden.
