= Vitån =

Coordinates: 65°56′N 22°27′E

Location
- Country: Sweden
- County: Norrbotten

Physical characteristics
- Length: 100 km (62 mi)
- Basin size: 518.7 km^{2} (200.3 sq mi)

Vitån is a river in Sweden.
