= Rok River =

Coordinates: 65°20′43″N 21°08′35″E

- Native name: Rokån (Swedish)

Location
- Country: Sweden
- County: Norrbotten

Physical characteristics
- Length: 55 km (34 mi)
- Basin size: 228.8 km^{2} (88.3 sq mi)

Rok River (Swedish: Rokån) is a river in Sweden.
