= Vierydsån =

Coordinates: 56°10′N 15°08′E

Location
- Country: Sweden

Physical characteristics
- Basin size: 165.2 km^{2} (63.8 sq mi)

Vierydsån is a river in Sweden.
