= Kålaboda River =

- Native name: Kålabodaån (Swedish)

Location
- Country: Sweden
- County: Västerbotten

Physical characteristics
- Mouth: Hertsångersalven
  - location: Ånäset, Västerbotten County
  - coordinates: 64°16′23″N 21°03′24″E
- Length: 30 km (19 mi)
- Basin size: 505.7 km^{2} (195.3 sq mi)

Kålaboda River (Swedish: Kålabodaån) is a river in Sweden.
