= Söderköpingsån =

Coordinates: 58.48027°N 16.32866°E

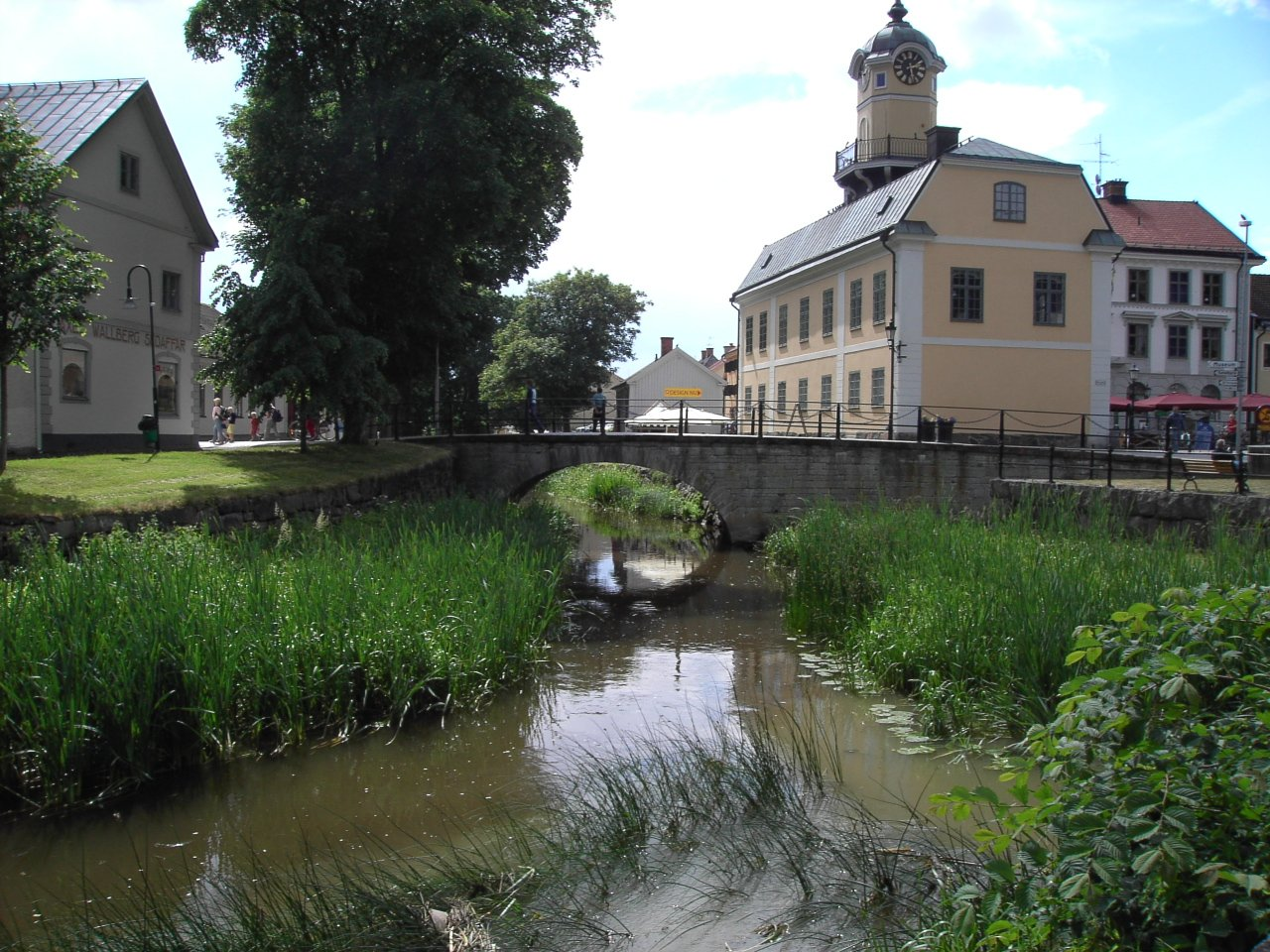

Location
- Country: Sweden
- County: Östergötland

Physical characteristics
- Length: 82 km (51 mi)
- Basin size: 881.7 km^{2} (340.4 sq mi)

Söderköpingsån is a river in Sweden.
