= Harmångersån =

Coordinates: 61°52′N 17°20′E

Location
- Country: Sweden

Physical characteristics
- Length: 81 km (50 mi)
- Basin size: 1,197.1 km^{2} (462.2 sq mi)

Harmångersån is a river in Sweden.
