= Norrtäljeån =

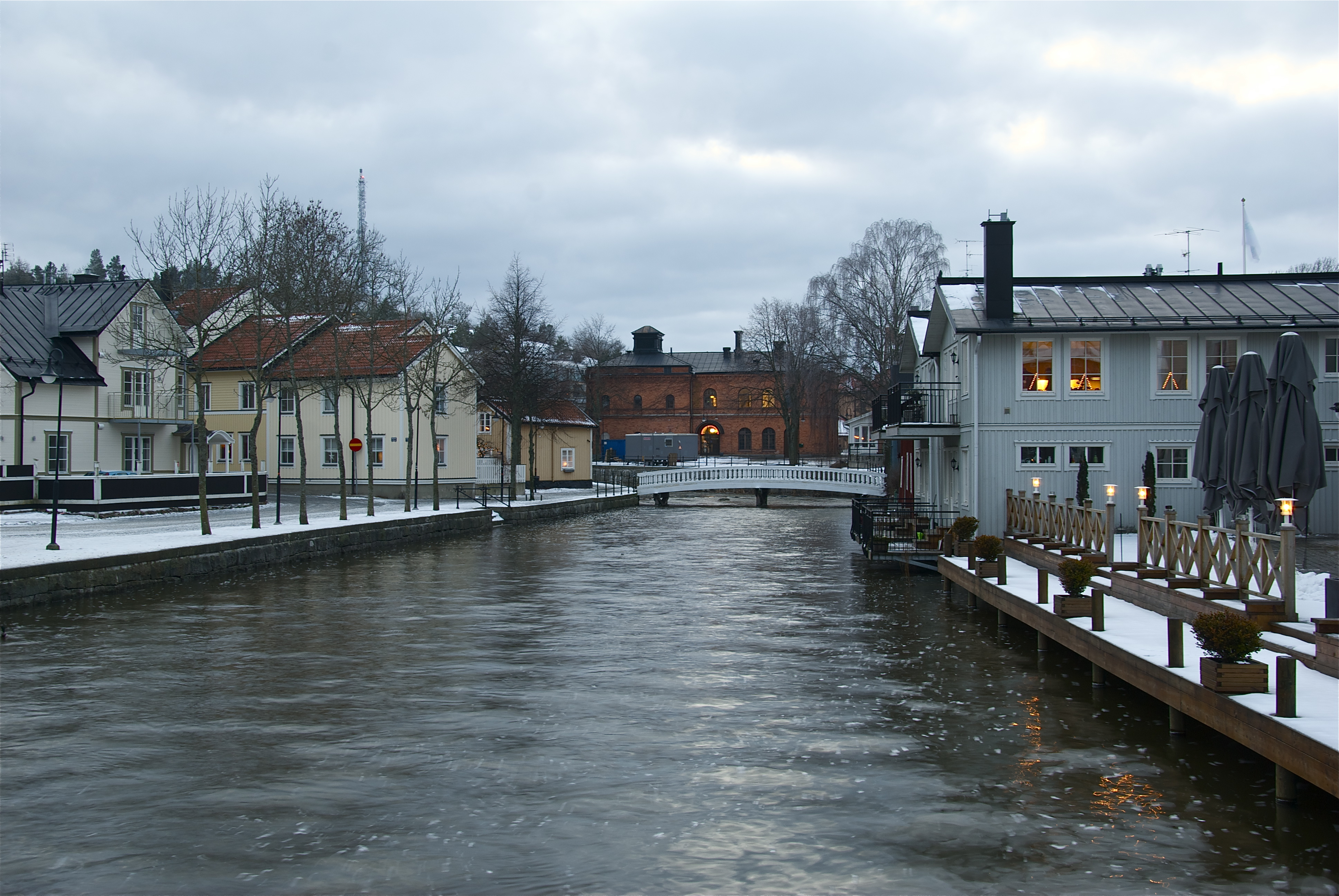
- Norrtäljeån in January 2012

Location
- Country: Sweden

Physical characteristics
- Source: Lommaren
  - coordinates: 59°45′26″N 18°40′50″E
- Mouth: Baltic Sea
  - location: Norrtälje
  - coordinates: 59°45′27″N 18°42′55″E
  - elevation: 0 m (0 ft)
- Length: 1.75 km (1.09 mi)
- Basin size: 351.9 km^{2} (135.9 sq mi)

Norrtäljeån is a river in Sweden. Sea trout are caught there.
