= Arån =

River in Sweden

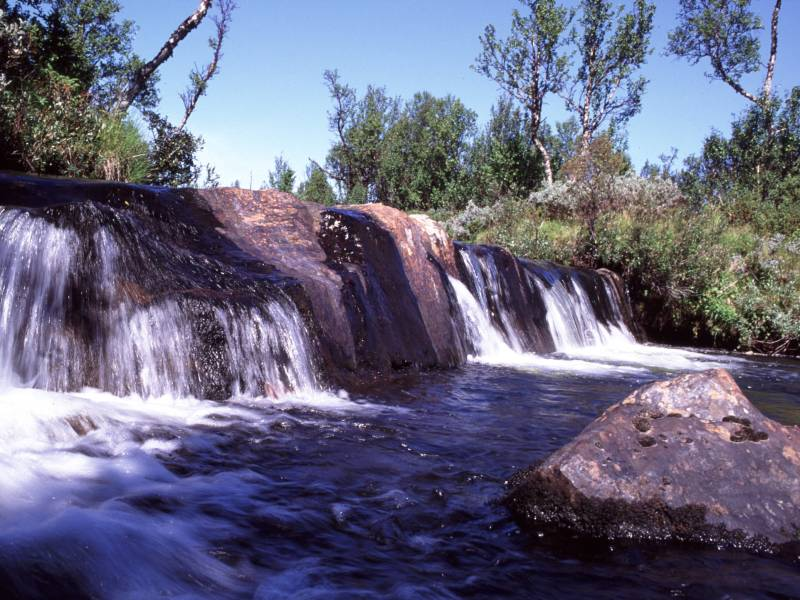

Location
- Country: Sweden
- County: Jämtland County

Physical characteristics
- Source: Oviksfjällen
- Mouth: Ljungan
  - location: Börtnan, Jämtland County
  - coordinates: 62°45′N 13°50′E

Arån is a river in Sweden.
