= Broströmmen =

River in Sweden

Coordinates: 59.81643°N 18.73402°E

Location
- Country: Sweden
- County: Stockholm

Physical characteristics
- Length: 45 km (28 mi)
- Basin size: 226.6 km^{2} (87.5 sq mi)

Broströmmen is a river in Sweden. It is about 15 kilometers long, or 45 kilometers including source drains. The catchment area is about 230 km², of which lakes make up about 13 percent.
