= Snärjebäcken =

Coordinates: 56°47′N 16°24′E

Location
- Country: Sweden
- County: Kalmar

Physical characteristics
- Basin size: 284.6 km^{2} (109.9 sq mi)

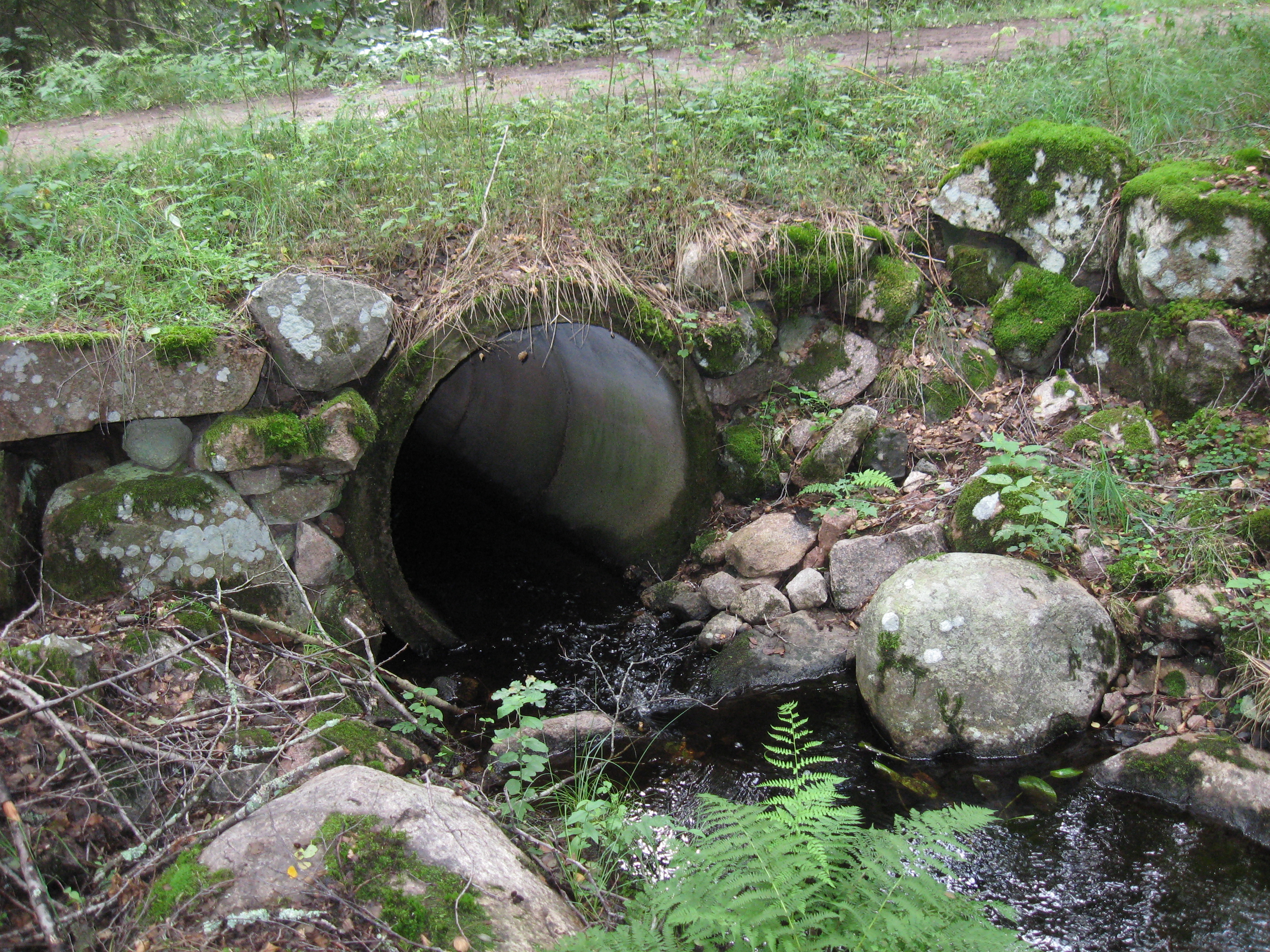
Snärjebäcken at Tokebro

Snärjebäcken is a river in Sweden.
