= Lillpite River =

Coordinates: 65.46285°N 20.45330°E

- Native name: Lillpiteälven (Swedish)

Location
- Country: Sweden
- County: Norrbotten

Physical characteristics
- Length: 90 km (56 mi)
- Basin size: 618.7 km^{2} (238.9 sq mi)

Lillpite River (Swedish: Lillpiteälven) is a river in Sweden.
