= Nianån =

Coordinates: 61.60285°N 17.05704°E

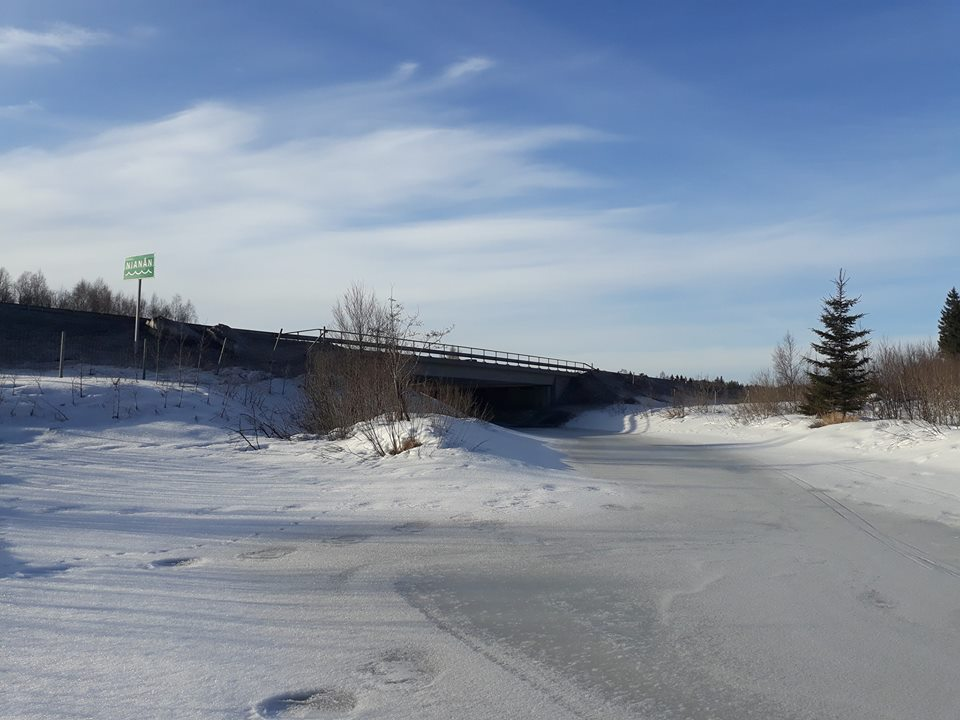

Location
- Country: Sweden
- County: Gävleborg

Physical characteristics
- Length: 40 km (25 mi)
- Basin size: 196.9 km^{2} (76.0 sq mi)

Nianån is a river in Sweden.
