= Botorpsströmmen =

Coordinates: 57.6227°N 16.5939°E

Location
- Country: Sweden

Physical characteristics
- Length: 75 km (47 mi)
- Basin size: 998.8 km^{2} (385.6 sq mi)

Botorpsströmmen is a river in Sweden.
