= Skärjån =

Coordinates: 61°03′N 17°07′E

Location
- Country: Sweden
- County: Gävleborg

Physical characteristics
- Length: 55 km (34 mi)
- Basin size: 329.7 km^{2} (127.3 sq mi)

Skärjån is a river in Sweden.
