= Mångby River =

Coordinates: 64.41573°N 21.25802°E

- Native name: Mångbyån (Swedish)

Location
- Country: Sweden
- County: Västerbotten

Physical characteristics
- Length: 20 km (12 mi)
- Basin size: 218.7 km^{2} (84.4 sq mi)

Mångby River (Swedish: Mångbyån) is a river in Sweden.
