= Keräsjoki =

River in Sweden

Coordinates: 65°47′N 23°56′E

Location
- Country: Sweden
- County: Norrbotten

Physical characteristics
- Length: 60 km (37 mi)
- Basin size: 426.6 km^{2} (164.7 sq mi)

Keräsjoki is a river in Norrland in Sweden.
