= Ältasjön =

Lake in Stockholm, Sweden

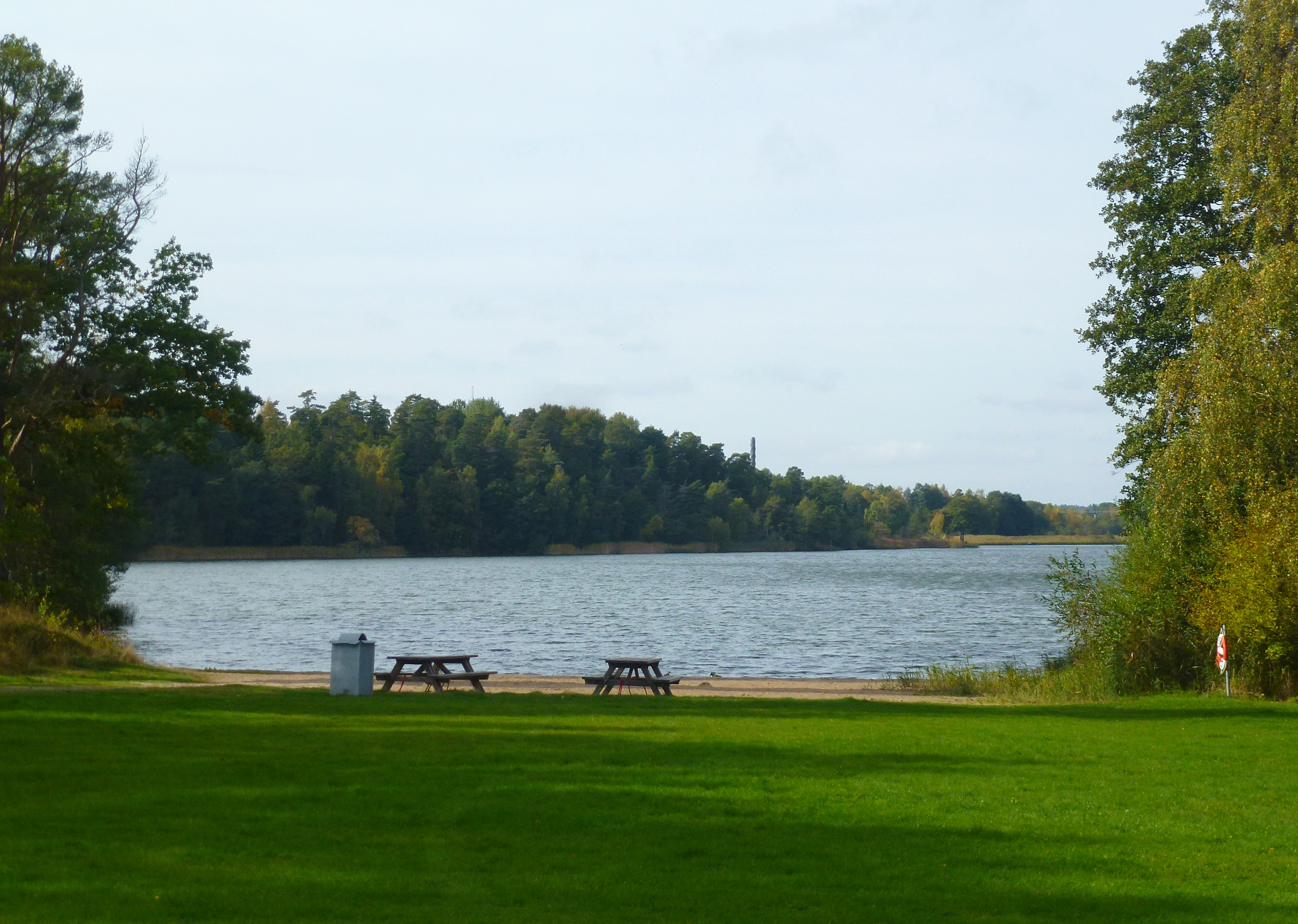

- Location within Stockholm
- Coordinates: 59°15′50″N 18°10′2″E
- Primary outflows: Ältaån
- Catchment area: 437 ha (1,080 acres)
- Basin countries: Sweden
- Surface area: 73 ha (180 acres)
- Average depth: 3.6 m (12 ft)
- Max. depth: 5.0 m (16.4 ft)
- Water volume: 2,710,000 m^{3} (96,000,000 cu ft)
- Residence time: 1.8 years
- Shore length^{1}: 5,350 m (17,550 ft) (including islands)
- Surface elevation: 23.2 m (76 ft)
- Islands: 2 (0.10 hectares or 0.25 acres)
- Settlements: Stockholm, Nacka
- ^{1} Shore length is not a well-defined measure.

Ältasjön (Swedish: "Lake of Älta") is a lake in southern Stockholm, Sweden, located north-east of Lake Flaten and named for the vicinity to the urban district Älta.

Ältasjön, of which the easternmost fourth belongs to the Stockholm Municipality and the rest to Nacka Municipality, is the uppermost lake in the Sicklaån water system which also include Ulvsjön, Söderbysjön, Dammtorpssjön, Källtorpssjön, Järlasjön, and Sicklasjön. The lake has a rich bird life and, bordering the Nacka Open-air Area (colloquially referred to as Nackareservatet, "Nacka [Nature] Reserve", but not given the status of a reserve), is used for bathing, camping, bird-watching, and water-skiing and is considered as of great recreational value. High levels of chlorophyll reduces clarity, but notwithstanding the traffic route passing nearby, metal levels are lower than in any other lake in Stockholm.

The "Save Ältasjön Society", Föreningen Rädda Ältasjön (FRÄS), has been working since 1975 to improve the environmental state of the lake and promote open-air activities in and around it.

== Catchment area ==
Approximately half of the catchment area is occupied by the settlements and roads of Älta, located within Nacka, with the remaining area composed of forests, wetlands, and smaller patches of open terrain. In the northern part, forming the southern part of the open-air area, is a deciduous hardwood forest. South of the lake is the traffic route Tyresövägen receiving some 20,000 vehicles per day, and west of the road is a speedway track.

=== Environmental influence ===
The lake receives about 200 kg phosphorus annually of which half comes from surface runoff and the rest is released from sediments. Surface runoff also adds 1,300 kg of nitrogen, most of which comes from the settlements of Älta. The lake used to be the recipient for poorly treated waste water from some 1,000 households today connected to the municipal sewers.

== Flora and fauna ==
In the early 20th century, phytoplankton was dominated by green algae, diatoms, and carapace flagellates with a smaller amount of cyanobacteria, a normal distribution for lakes rich in nutrients. By 2000, the biomass was almost exclusively composed of cyanobacteria, most of them non-poisonous "thin filaments" and anabacena the only species being able to fixate nitrogen. Today, the only reminder of the 1990s is the relatively frequent occurrence of the carapace flagellate Ceratium hirundinella. Zooplankton, moderate levels of rotifers and copepods, have shown insignificant variations with time.

An inventory of aquatic plants in 1997 showed the western and southern parts of the lake are dominated by spiked water-milfoil and yellow water-lily, while the eastern part is dominated by common club-rush and common reed. Stratiotes aloides is found near the lake outlet.

The same inventory reported 45 species/taxa in the lake-bed fauna, which includes all common species, dominated by Trichoptera, Ephemeroptera, Odonata, freshwater gastropods, and leeches. perch, roach, northern pike, tench, silver bream, ruffe, and crucian carp have been documented in the lake, sample catches typically exceeding excepted levels. Zander was introduced in the late 1990s. crayfish plague caused a population of European crayfish to disappear in 1984, subsequently replaced by signal crayfish introduced throughout the 1990s. In 1993 the population of amphibians included moor frog and common toad, of which only the later was found by 1996.

The lake is an important stop-over for many bird species, including tufted duck, common goldeneye, and common merganser; and, more rarely, Slavonian grebe, and smew. Breeding species attracted to the lake include Eurasian coot, great crested grebe, and pochard; additionally common tern is often seen by the lake and occasionally breeds here. Other protected species found by the lake include common snipe and lesser spotted woodpecker.

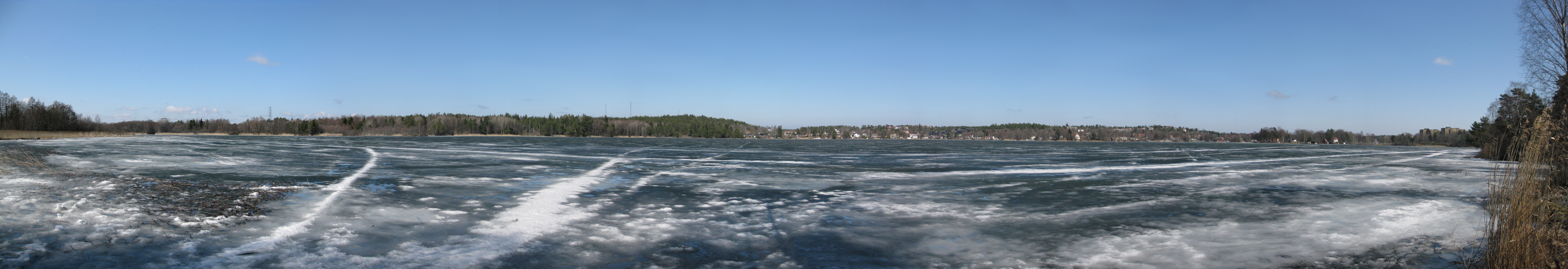
Panorama of Ältasjön, Nacka, southern Stockholm, Sweden

== See also ==
- Geography of Stockholm
- Lakes of Sweden
