= Bällstaån =

Coordinates: 59.3839°N 17.8974°E

Bällstaån Spångaån
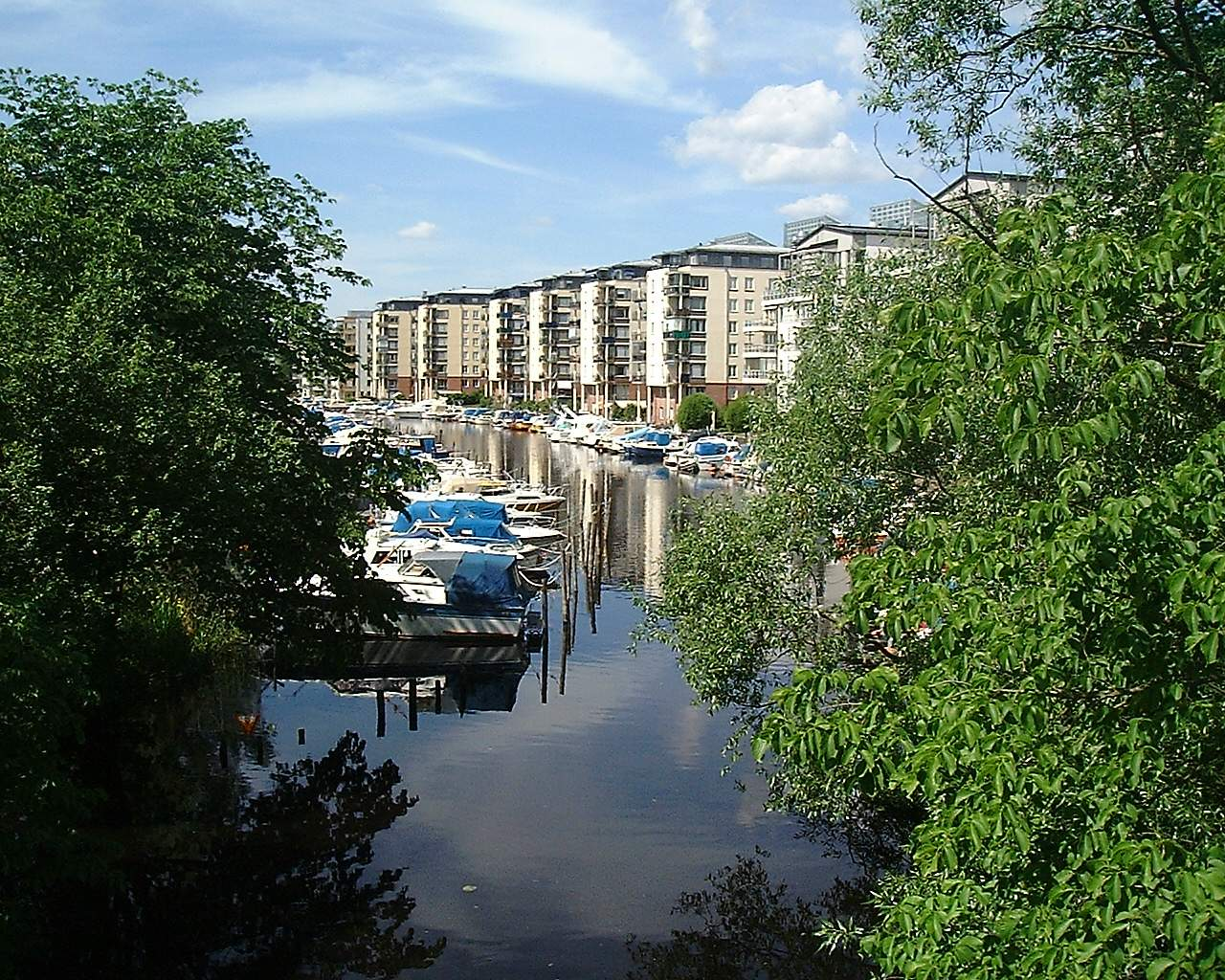

Location
- Country: Sweden

Physical characteristics
- Source: Viksjö
  - location: Järfälla
- Mouth: Bällstaviken in Ulvsundasjön
- Length: 10.5 km (6.5 mi)
- Basin size: 36 km^{2} (14 sq mi)

Bällstaån or Spångaån (Swedish: "Stream of Bällsta/Spånga") is a small stream in northern Stockholm. Flowing through the municipalities of Järfälla, Stockholm, Sundbyberg, and Solna, it empties in the bay Bällstaviken, the innermost part of Ulvsundasjön.

Some 1,4 km of the stream is passing through culverts and long stretches of it have been straitened out to form part of the local stormwater system. Notwithstanding, other sections are furnished with promenades and ponds and therefore considered as of local recreational interest. The municipalities sharing the catchment area, together with the county administrative board, are collaborating to improve water quality and the areas surrounding the stream.

== Catchment area ==
Flowing from Viksjö in Järfälla, the stream starts as a ditch receiving considerable amounts of stormwater from the residential area Jakobsberg. After a little more than 2 km, near Barkarby Airport, it dives into a short culvert before merging with another ditch (Veddsta dike) bringing water from a golf range, industrial and residential areas. It then passes under the traffic route E18 to continue 1 km through an open grassland in a natural meandering shape past some allotment-gardens near Tensta before reaching the ponds in the park of Hjulsta. The stream is guided under the central commercial district of Spånga through a tunnel 1.4 km long, opening out near Bromsten industrial area, and receiving stormwater from surrounding areas. It then flows past the residential neighbourhood Bällsta before reaching two ponds in a park and receiving water from a second ditch (Nälsta dike) bringing water from residential areas at Nälsta, Flysta, and Solhem. It then flows through the harness racing track Solvalla, where the water is used for fountains during races. Downstream Solvalla, it becomes broad with a slow flow, occasionally becoming stagnant. Bällstaån finally receives water from Rissne, Duvbo, and Sundbyberg before emptying into Bällstaviken under the bridge Löfströmsbron.

=== Environmental influence ===
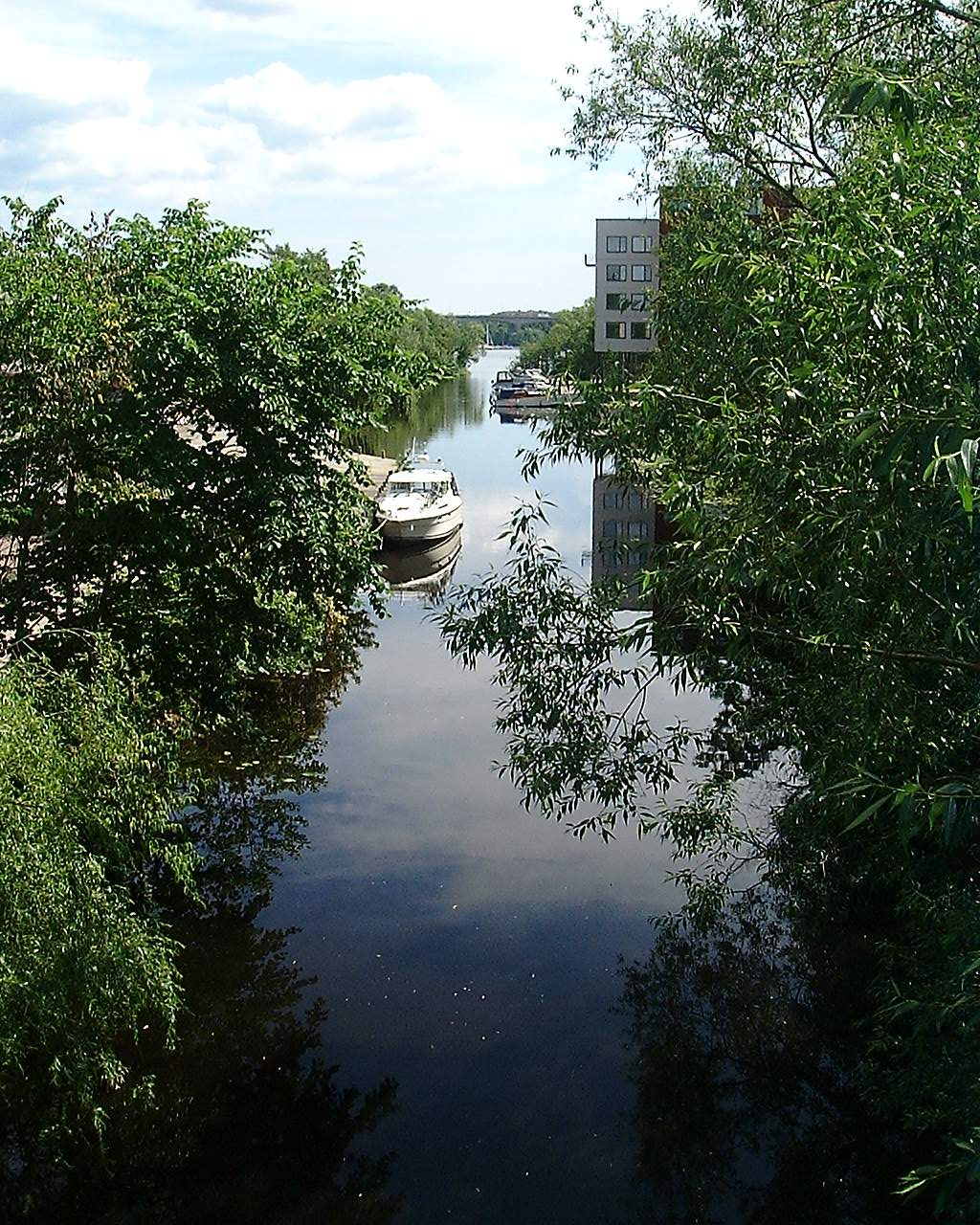
Bällstaviken

As most of the inflow comes from settled grounds, including industrial areas and streets, the stream contains high levels of nutrients, metals and bacteria, with sediments contaminated with oil. The river receives 1400 kg/year of phosphorus and 16000 kg/year of nitrogen. Increased levels of pollutants and bacteria downstream Spånga is believed to stem from stormwater pipes but no source have been identified. Increased levels of metals, particularly copper, has been reported, and minor oil discharges are rather common with negative impact on local bird life.

== Flora and fauna ==
No inventory of aquatic plants has been made, but greater dodder has been documented around the Lunda Industrial Area. No rare species of bottom fauna were found during an inventory in 1999, the stream being quantitatively dominated by a few species. Noteworthy is the gastropod Valvata piscinalis found near the residential area Bällsta. The stream is, nonetheless, important for various birds, including black-headed gull, common gull, lesser black-backed gull, herring gull, and Slavonian grebe reported at Hjulsta Water Park. As stretches of the watercourse remain ice-free during winters, it attracts ducks and teal, which have both been spending winters here.

== See also ==
- Geography of Stockholm
- Rivers of Sweden
- Spånga
