= Kräppladiket =

Watercourse in Rågsved, southern Stockholm, Sweden

Coordinates: 59°14′48″N 18°2′43.5″E

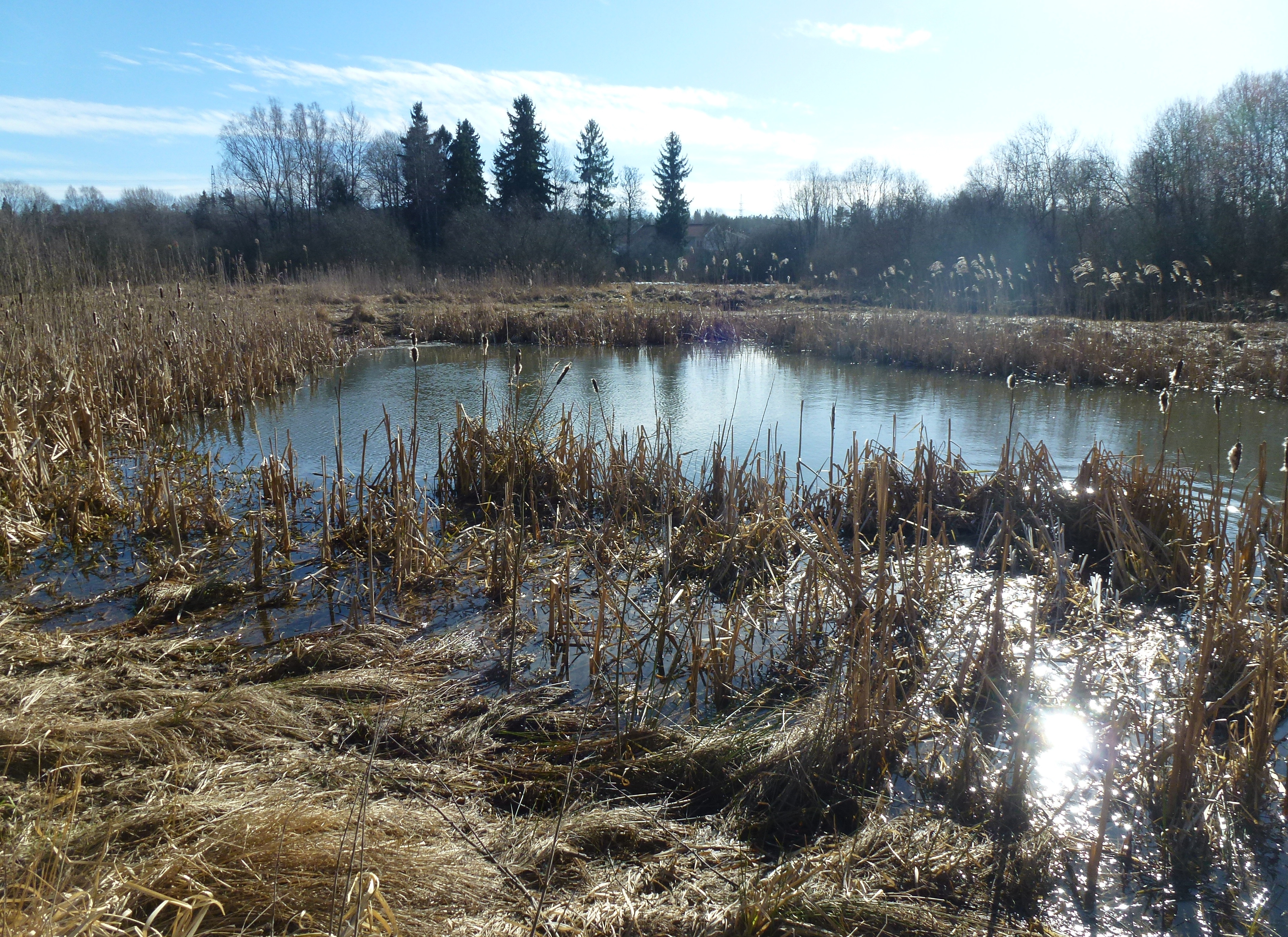

Kräppladiket is one of the four inflow rivers of Lake Magelungen in southern Stockholm, Sweden. It empties into the lake in its northern end together with Magelungsdiket and Norrån while Djupån joins the lake on its southern end.

In contrast to Magelungsdiket, Kräppladiket was not considerably affected by the construction of the south-western suburbs in the early 1950s, but important part of the ditch was however guided through culverts limiting the open stream to the 1,4 km passing through the Rågsved Open-air Area south of Rågsved. A bit less than 50 per cent of the catchment area is occupied by one-family houses and green spaces. The upper reach of the ditch is thus affected by relatively low levels of phosphorus and nitrogen, while samples by the lower reach, next to the Snösätra industrial area, showed a presence of high levels of metals. The mouth of Kräppladiket is located in a Reed bed and no defined outflow exists.

In 2006 works were started to create a small stormwater dam to purify the water of the ditch before it reaches Lake Magelungen. Hopefully, the initiative will also attract birds, reptiles, and plants. The initiative is part of a project aiming at making Magelungen accessible to angling, rowing, and canoeing by dredging selected portions of it.

== See also ==
- Geography of Stockholm
- Rivers of Sweden
