= Norrån =

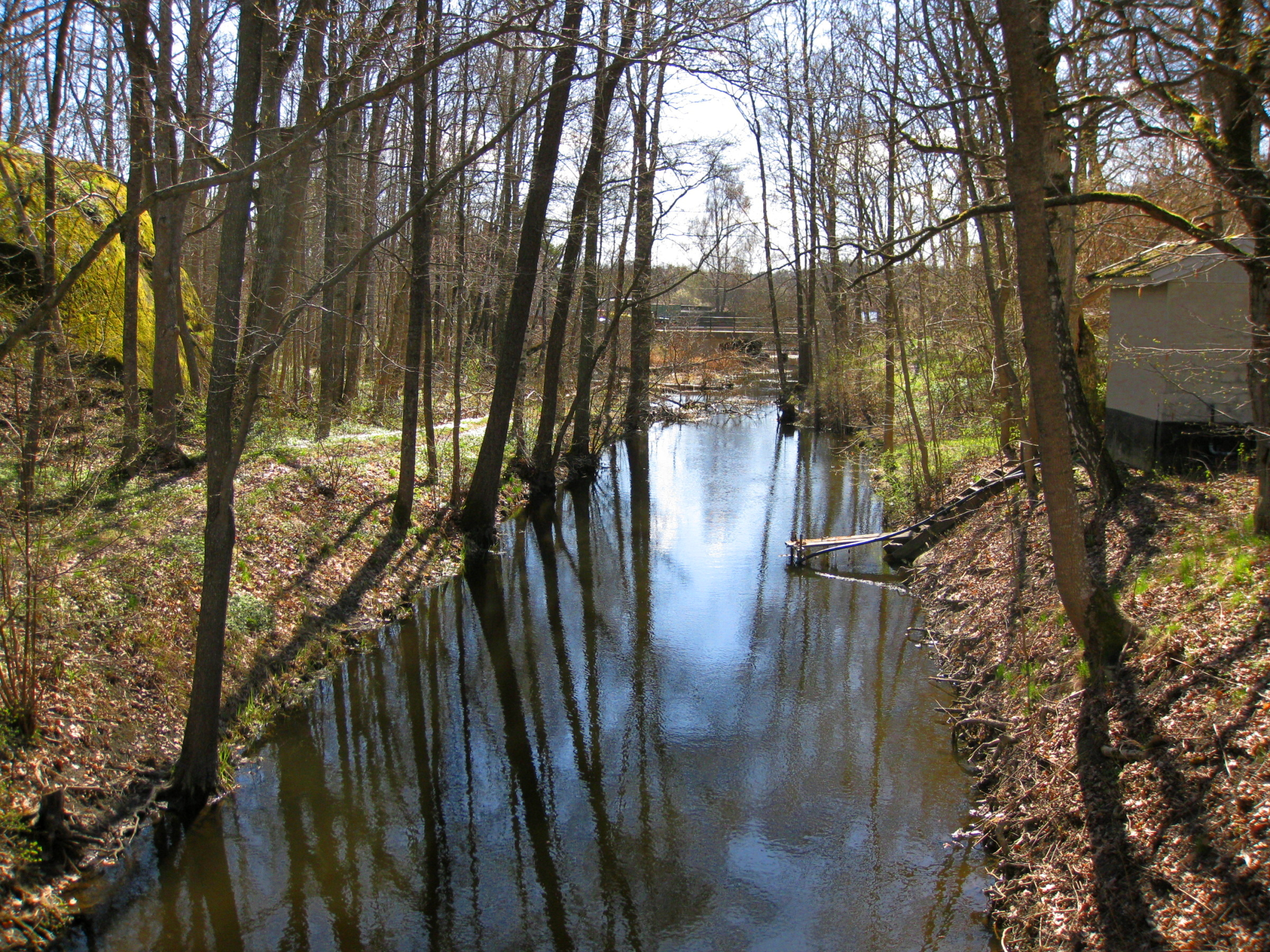

Location
- Country: Sweden
- County: Stockholm
- Municipality: Huddinge

Physical characteristics
- Source: Ågestasjön
  - coordinates: 59°13′38″N 18°04′29″E
- Mouth: Magelungen
  - coordinates: 59°13′52″N 18°04′28″E
- Length: 0.5 km (0.31 mi)

Norrån is a river in Södermanland, Sweden.

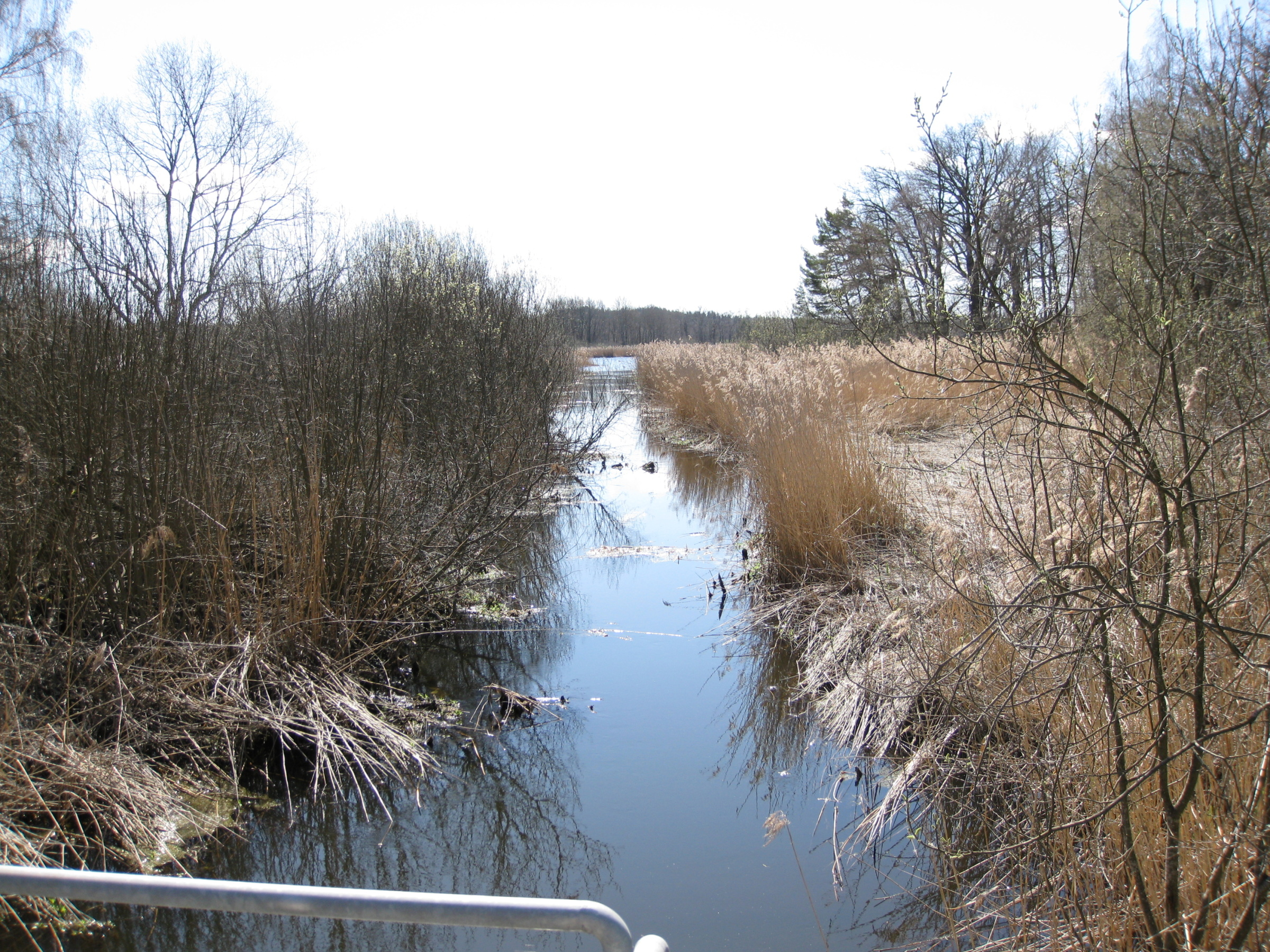
Ågestasjön outlet

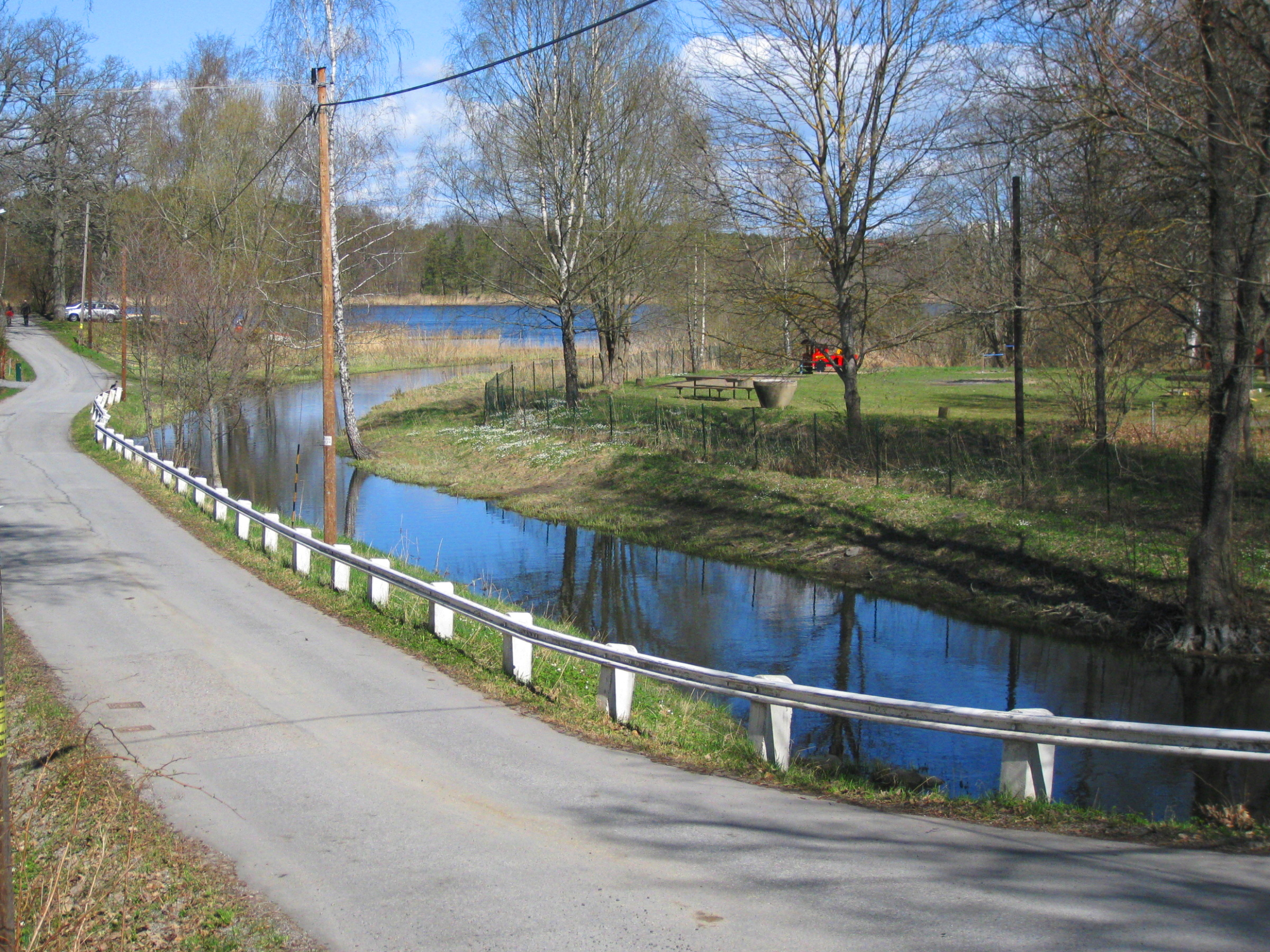
Norrån outlet in Magelungen
