= Magelungen =

Lake in Stockholm, Sweden

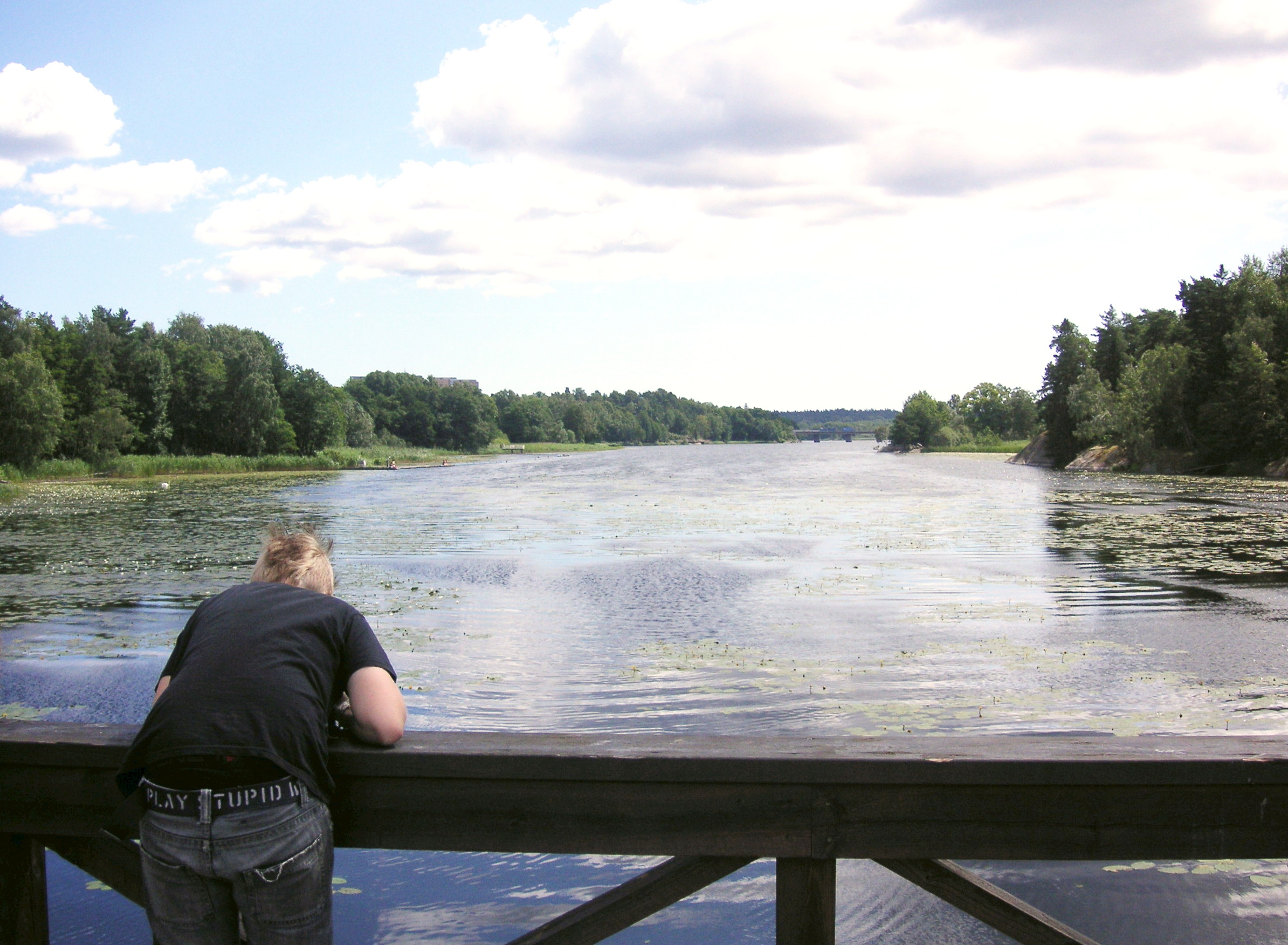

- Location within Stockholm
- Location: Stockholm/Huddinge, Stockholm County
- Coordinates: 59°13′51″N 18°5′19″E
- Primary inflows: Magelungsdiket. Kräppladiket, Djupån, stormwater
- Primary outflows: Forsån, Drevviken
- Catchment area: 1,907 ha (4,710 acres)
- Basin countries: Sweden
- Surface area: 245 ha (610 acres)
- Average depth: 5.0 m (16.4 ft)
- Max. depth: 13.7 m (45 ft)
- Water volume: 11,600,000 m^{3} (9,400 acre⋅ft)
- Residence time: 4-5 months
- Settlements: Stockholm

Magelungen (Swedish pronunciation: [ˈmɑ̂ːɡɛˌlɵŋːɛn]) is one of the biggest lakes in Stockholm, Sweden, located between the municipalities of Stockholm and Huddinge. It is considered as of great recreational value and is popular for bathing, yachting, and fishing in summers, and tour skating in winters. The lake borders two nature reserves: Fagersjöskogen/Farstanäset and Rågsved Open-Air Area.

== Catchment area ==
Less than half of the catchment area is composed of forest and open grasslands. Some 10 per cent is wetlands and parks, and the remaining area is covered by one-family houses and blocks of flats. Two bridges cross the lake; several major roads pass through the catchment area, as do the above ground tracks of the metro and suburban railway. South of the lake is a larger continuous forest, a golf course, and an open-air centre. Besides the nature reserve, areas on the northern side are used for riding and Allotment-gardens.

The primary catchment area is relatively small and composed of three ditches — Magelungsdiket, Kräppladiket, and Djupån — together contributing about 3 million cubic metres annually. Stormwater is brought to the lake via a great number of pipes together bringing about 10 million cubic metres. The remaining catchment area brings less than 1 million cubic metres annually.

=== Environmental influences ===
Most of the phosphorus discharged into the lake, totalling 1,800 kg/year, is brought from the lake Ågestasjön (~1,000 kg) through the Norrån river, while the primary catchment area brings some 500 kg. Of the 25 tons of nitrogen brought annually to the lake, about 18 tons comes from Norrån and some 6 tons from the primary catchment area. The deepest south-eastern part of the lake suffers from oxygen deficiency and hydrogen sulphide which causes high levels of phosphorus. Most of the zinc and copper comes from roofs, while high levels of metals have been reported in stormwater from a local industrial area.

== Flora and fauna ==
In the south-eastern part of the lake, phytoplankton are dominated by various species of cyanobacteria, some of which are nitrogen-binding and potentially poisonous, and exceptionally other nutrient-demanding algae and dinoflagellates. Zooplankton are only found in small quantities. Variations in quantity appears between the southern and northern parts of the lake, with more an abundant presence of green algae in the northern end where dinoflagellates are substituted also by diatoms. There is a striking abundance of spiked water-milfoil and rigid hornswort in the north-western part of the lake. An inventory in 1998 also documented Chara globularis, common waterweed, white water-lily, yellow water-lily, branched bur-reed, flowering rush, and Stratiotes aloides.

An inventory of the fauna in 1997 documented some 55 species, which was considered a relatively high diversity. Most prevalent were freshwater gastropods, caddisflies, leeches, and beetles. Common fish are perch, silver bream, roach, and zander; but burbot, European smelt, and eel have also been reported. Zander, grass carp, and trout have been introduced. Angling is thus popular in the lake. Crayfish plague struck the lake in 1978 but signal crayfish were reintroduced in 1984.

A number of birds breed along the north-western shore, including Eurasian coot, common moorhen, mallard, and great crested grebe. Lesser spotted woodpecker have been reported in the surrounding forest and the lake is the home of a rare pair of marsh harriers. Black-headed gull, common gull, herring gull, common tern, osprey, heron, Canada goose, mute swan, and greylag goose have been sighted. Breeding species include great crested grebe, common teal, common snipe, and reed bunting. Only occasionally seen are garganey, common kingfisher, osprey, and gadwall.

Frog fry was reported in 2001 near the inflow of the lake, an indication amphibians are resettling the area. Several species of bats have been sighted around the lake.

== See also ==
- Geography of Stockholm
- Lakes in Sweden
