= Sätraån =

Coordinates: 59.2859°N 17.8992°E

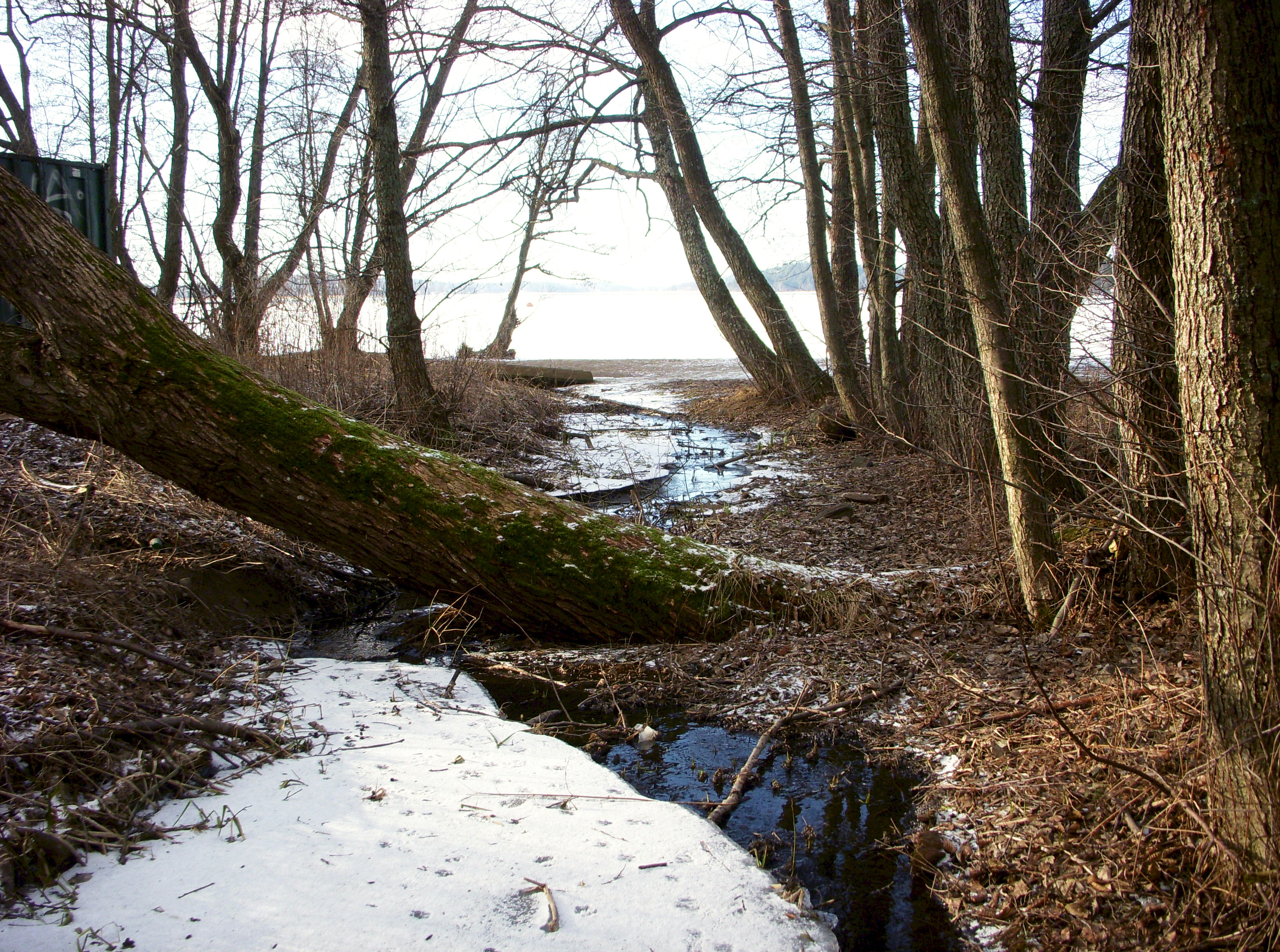

Location
- Country: Sweden

Physical characteristics
- Source: Local stormwater
- Mouth: Mälaren
- Length: 1 km (0.62 mi)
- Basin size: 0.18 km^{2} (0.069 sq mi)

Sätraån (Swedish: "Stream of Sätra") is a stream in southern Stockholm, Sweden.

Previously stretching 6 km from Västertorp and Segeltorp, Sätraån is today confined to the Sätra Open-air Area and approximately a kilometre long. The limited current discharge causes the stream to be reduced to minor temporary pools of water except during spring. Nevertheless, the stream is considered a valuable natural environment because of the ravine it has cut through the landscape and because of its location in a forest of recreational importance to the suburb Sätra.

== Catchment area ==
The catchment area, once encompassing a major portion of south-west Stockholm (roughly 11–12 km²), is today insignificant and the stream is drained during most of the year. The inflow was slightly increased in 2002 when a stormwater pipe was modified and a dam was built to treat the water. The mouth of the stream is located near a public bathe. Most of the surrounding area is covered by grass and forests with no settlements within the current catchment area.

=== Environmental influence ===
Notwithstanding the limited extent of the catchment area, the few samples taken in the area showed significant levels of phosphorus, nitrogen, and metals; a situation explained by the inflow of groundwater from an area larger than suggested by the extent of the watershed. Samples taken in 2000 showed levels of lead, zinc, and copper were exceptional in the upper course.

== Flora and fauna ==
Bottom fauna includes some 53 species, typically endurable to nutrient-rich aquatic environments offering stagnant waters and low levels of oxygen - most commonly various species of Oligochaeta and Pisidium. An inventory in late 1999 / early 2000 also documented larvae of Chironomidae flies and Asellus aquaticus crustaceans; A few species of beetles and caddisflies, including species more typical for moist environments such as wetlands and marshes. Also species sensitive to acidification, such as Gammarus pulex and Baera pullata, were recorded. Near the mouth of the stream various species of mayflies common to exposed lake shores and running waters were documented.

== See also ==
- Geography of Stockholm
- Rivers of Sweden
