= Magelungsdiket =

Watercourse in Rågsved, southern Stockholm, Sweden

Coordinates: 59°15′5″N 18°2′44″E

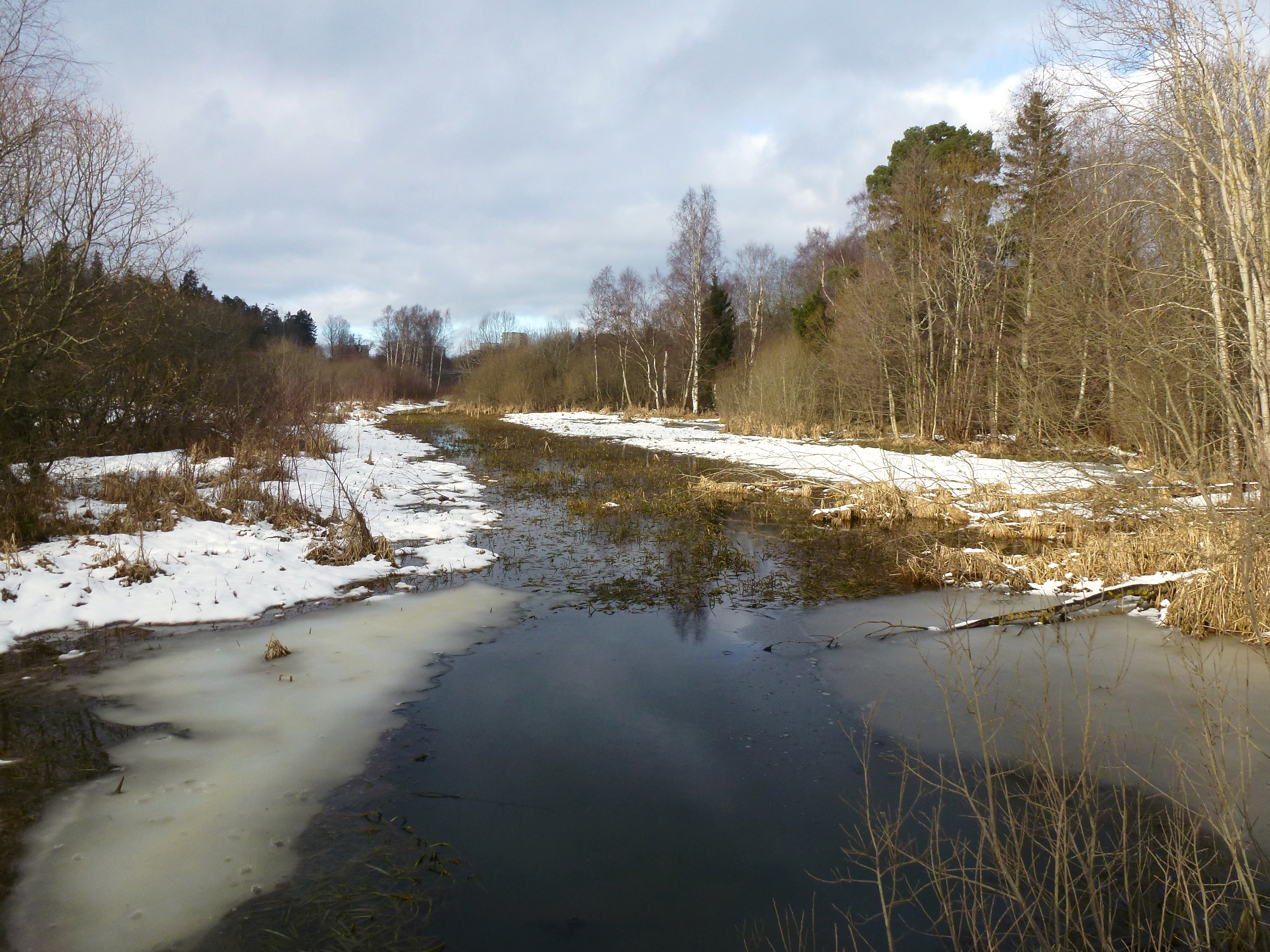
Magelungsdiket, 2015

Magelungsdiket (Swedish: Magelungen Ditch) is one of three inflows of Lake Magelungen in southern Stockholm, Sweden. It empties into the lake from north together with Kräppladiket while Djupån reaches the southern end of the lake.

Magelungsdiket had a drainage area of 17 km^{2} stretching north to Mälarhöjden until the south-western suburbs of Stockholm were built in the early 1950s and water was guided to Lake Mälaren through stormwater pipes. Today only 1,5 km^{2} remains of the drainage area and most of the contributions comes from one-family houses in eastern Rågsved and green areas around Magelungen. Water flow is slow, often stagnant, and the ditch is surrounded by dense vegetation. It opened out in a wetland drained in 1994 in order to create canals and minor islands attracting birds. Very high levels of metals have been reported from a street inlet near the outlet. Together with Kräpplingadiket, it is estimated to contribute some 100 kg/year of phosphorus. The ditch is one of a few locales for Grass Snake in Stockholm.

== See also ==
- Geography of Stockholm
- Rivers of Sweden
