= Forsån =

Coordinates: 59°14′10″N 18°7′18″E

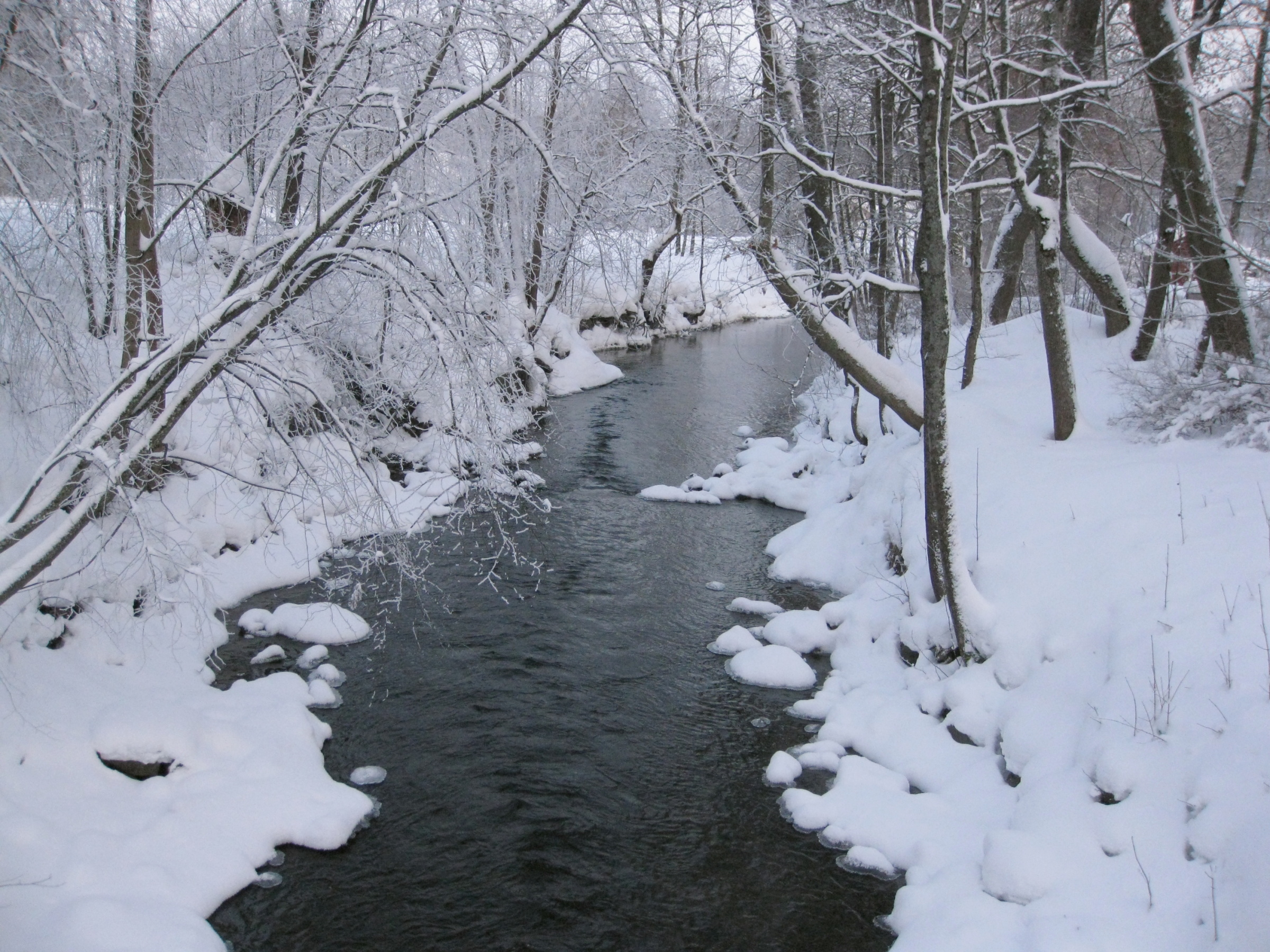

Location
- Country: Sweden

Physical characteristics
- Source: Magelungen
- Mouth: Drevviken
- Length: 1.4 km (0.87 mi)
- Basin size: 0.8 km^{2} (0.31 sq mi)

Forsån (Swedish: "Rapids' Stream") is a stream in southern Stockholm, Sweden. It is also known as Stortorpsån and Forsen.

Leaving lake Magelungen calmly by a small sandy beach, Forsån's upper reach passes through a furrow blown in the 1860s to lower the level of the lake resulting in the present wide torrents passing through the bedrock. In contrast, the last 500 metres of the course are characterized by flat shores and stagnant, overgrown waters. The stream has a vigorous population of signal crayfish and is the only winter habitat in Stockholm for white-throated dipper.

== Catchment area ==
Approximately half of the catchment area is occupied by contaminated ground and polluting operations in the Larsboda industrial area; with the remaining area composed of parks and green spaces. One of the minor allotment-garden's is located in an area which is crossed by two major traffic routes and a railway.

=== Environmental influence ===
The inflow from Magelungen brings approximately 2 tons of phosphorus and 30 tons of nitrogen to Forsån, the contribution from the catchment area itself, 10 kg and 40 kg respectively, is insignificant in comparison. No estimates of the level of metals brought to the stream has been done, but low or moderate levels of common metals were reported in river sediments in 1997. Although very high levels of lead next to the road Magelungsvägen were reported.

== Fauna ==
Samples of bottom fauna taken in 1998 documented the presence of nationally rare species of gastropods such as Hippeutis complanatus and bivalve swan mussel; and during the preceding decades two species of limnetic gastropods were documented. Larvae of white-legged damselfly and blue-tailed damselfly were recorded in summer 2000. Signal crayfish and trout have been introduced in the stream, of which the former succeeded in establishing while roach is believed to be unfavourable to the latter. The white water rapids make a section of the stream ice-free during the winter time which attracts white-throated dippers and common kingfishers. In 1996, traces of beaver were reported.

== See also ==
- Geography of Stockholm
- Rivers of Sweden
