= Sicklasjön =

Lake in Sweden

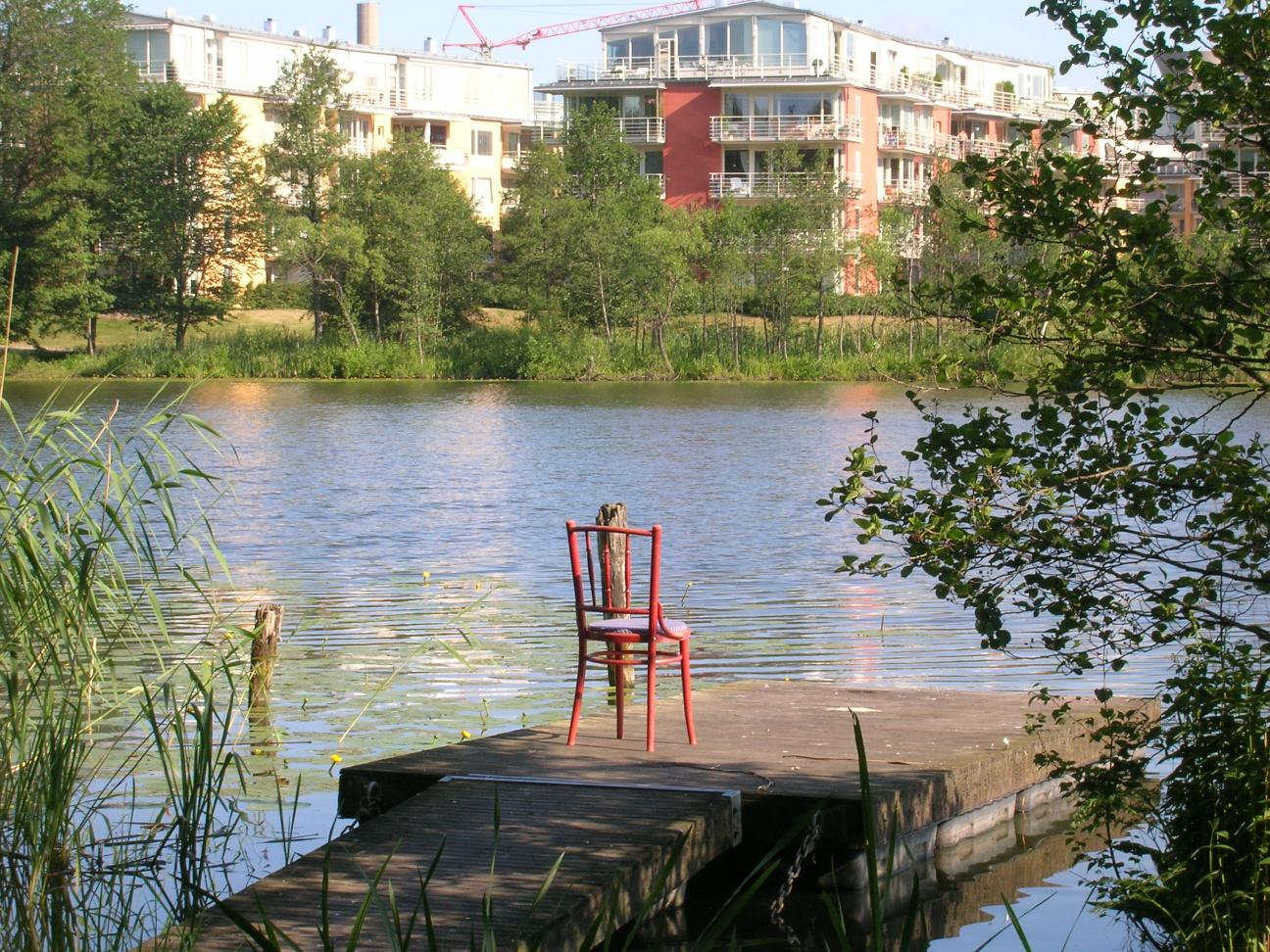

- Location within Stockholm
- Coordinates: 59°18′4″N 18°7′39″E
- Primary inflows: Järlasjön
- Primary outflows: Hammarby Sjö, Sickla Sluss
- Catchment area: 437 ha (1,080 acres)
- Basin countries: Sweden
- Surface area: 15.4 ha (38 acres)
- Average depth: 3.0 m (9.8 ft)
- Max. depth: 5.4 m (18 ft)
- Water volume: 466,000 m^{3} (378 acre⋅ft)
- Residence time: 0.1 year
- Shore length^{1}: 3,940 m (12,930 ft) (including islands)
- Surface elevation: 4.9 m (16 ft)
- Islands: 1 (0.03 hectares or 0.074 acres)
- Settlements: Stockholm, Nacka
- ^{1} Shore length is not a well-defined measure.

Sicklasjön (Swedish: "Lake of Sickla") is a lake in eastern central Stockholm, Sweden. It is bordering the municipalities of Stockholm and Nacka and is named for the vicinity to the urban district Sickla.

Sicklasjön, historically known as Långsjön ("Long Lake"), is connected to Järlasjön east of it through a narrow strait and to Hammarby Sjö west of it through the canal Sickla Kanal and the sluice Sickla Sluss. The lake, forming the northern border of the Nacka Open-air Area (Nacka friluftsområde, colloquially known as Nackareservatet, "Nacka [Nature] Reserve"), is considered as of significant recreational and natural value. Water flow is periodically important but inconsiderable during summers when the lake remains relatively stratified.

== Catchment area ==
The lake is the last lake in the Sicklaån water system formed in an east-west oriented fissure valley. The catchment area is highly exploited with most of it used for one-family houses, block of flats, offices, industrial areas, and roads. On the southern shore are patches of hardwood forests, a few feeder streams, a promenade, and the old farm Lilla Sickla south of which are several minor wetlands. The closed stock pile Hammarbybacken containing various types of excavated materials is located within the catchment area. Next to Sickla Kanal is a subterranean plant used to treat sludge disposal. New residential areas have been constructed in the western end of the lake.

=== Environmental influence ===
Approximately 400 kg phosphorus is transported through the lake annually, of which some 80 per cent comes from the other lakes in the water system. Surface runoff adds some 50 kg phosphorus and 600 kg nitrogen, while roughly 24 kg phosphorus is released from lake sediments and atmospheric deposits adds some 120 kg of nitrogen. Most of metal contribution, copper, lead, and zinc, comes from Hammarbybacken where high levels of arsenic, chromium, phthalates, PCB, and Carbon tetrachloride have also been recorded. Even though most of these pollutions are bound to particles, leachate from the eastern part of the tip is believed to leak into the lake. Chlorophyll content have decreased since the 1980s and is at present around 45 μg/L which gives a transparency of 1,5 m.

== Flora and fauna ==
Most common phytoplankton species are filamentous cyanobacteria and diatoms, while zooplankton are represented by daphnia and copepods. Common aquatic plants in the water column include rigid hornwort and yellow water-lily coupled with a presence of Nuttall's waterweed, frogbit, common duckweed, white waterlily, amphibious bistort, and four species of pondweeds.

An inventory of lakebed fauna in 1997 documented 47 species/taxa, predominantly freshwater gastropods, beetles, and dragonflies. The same year, perch, roach, bleak, and a few other species were documented in the lake. Crayfish was introduced in 1992 and 1995-96. Except for seabirds such as the mallard and Eurasian coot, the thrush nightingale is present on the southern shore. Species of bats documented includes the northern bat, Nyctalus, Daubenton's bat, and Brandt's bat. Additionally, the area is a great locale for amphibians, with a presence of common toad and moor frog, and traces of beaver have been found around the lake.

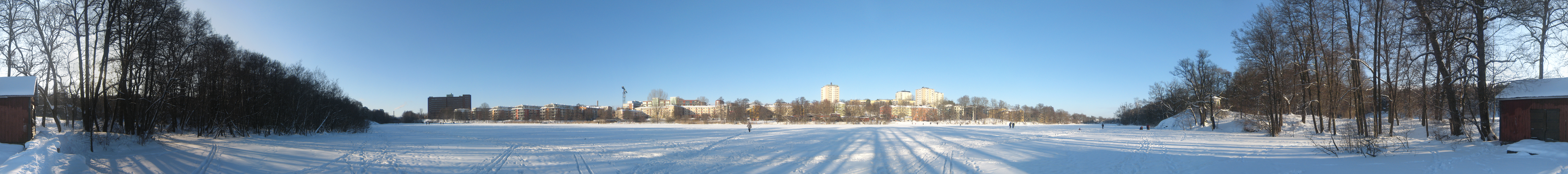
Sicklasjön in february 2010 seen from the south side.

== See also ==
- Geography of Stockholm
- Lakes of Sweden
