= Ågestasjön =

Lake in Huddinge Municipality, Sweden

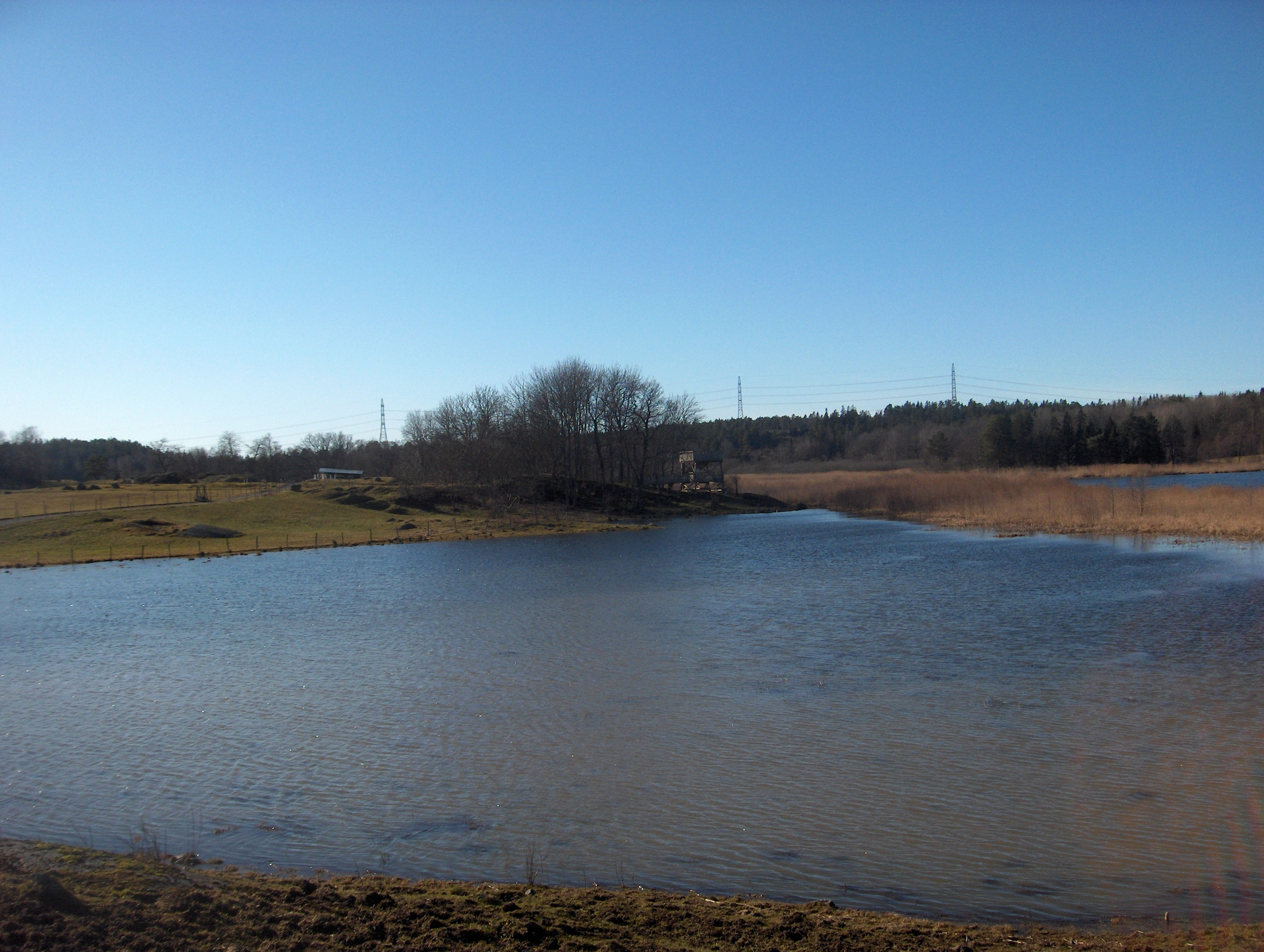
- Ågestasjön in spring 2008

- Location within Sweden
- Coordinates: 59°13′26″N 18°04′22″E
- Primary inflows: Orlången, Trehörningen
- Primary outflows: Magelungen
- Basin countries: Sweden
- Surface area: 0.380 km^{2} (0.147 sq mi)
- Max. depth: 1.5 m (4 ft 11 in)
- Water volume: 320,000 m^{3} (11,000,000 cu ft)
- Surface elevation: 20 m (66 ft)
- Settlements: Huddinge

Ågestasjön (Swedish for "Lake of Ågesta") is a small lake in Huddinge Municipality south of Stockholm, Sweden.

Ågestasjön forms part of the Tyresån Lake System and, with a biodiversity unique in the Stockholm region, is highly popular among birdwatchers and ornithologists. The lake also forms part of the Orlången Nature Reserve and one of the green wedges stretching into central Stockholm.

The lakes receives water from Lake Trehörningen and in its northern end empties into Magelungen. For a brief history of the area see Trehörningen.

== Catchment area ==
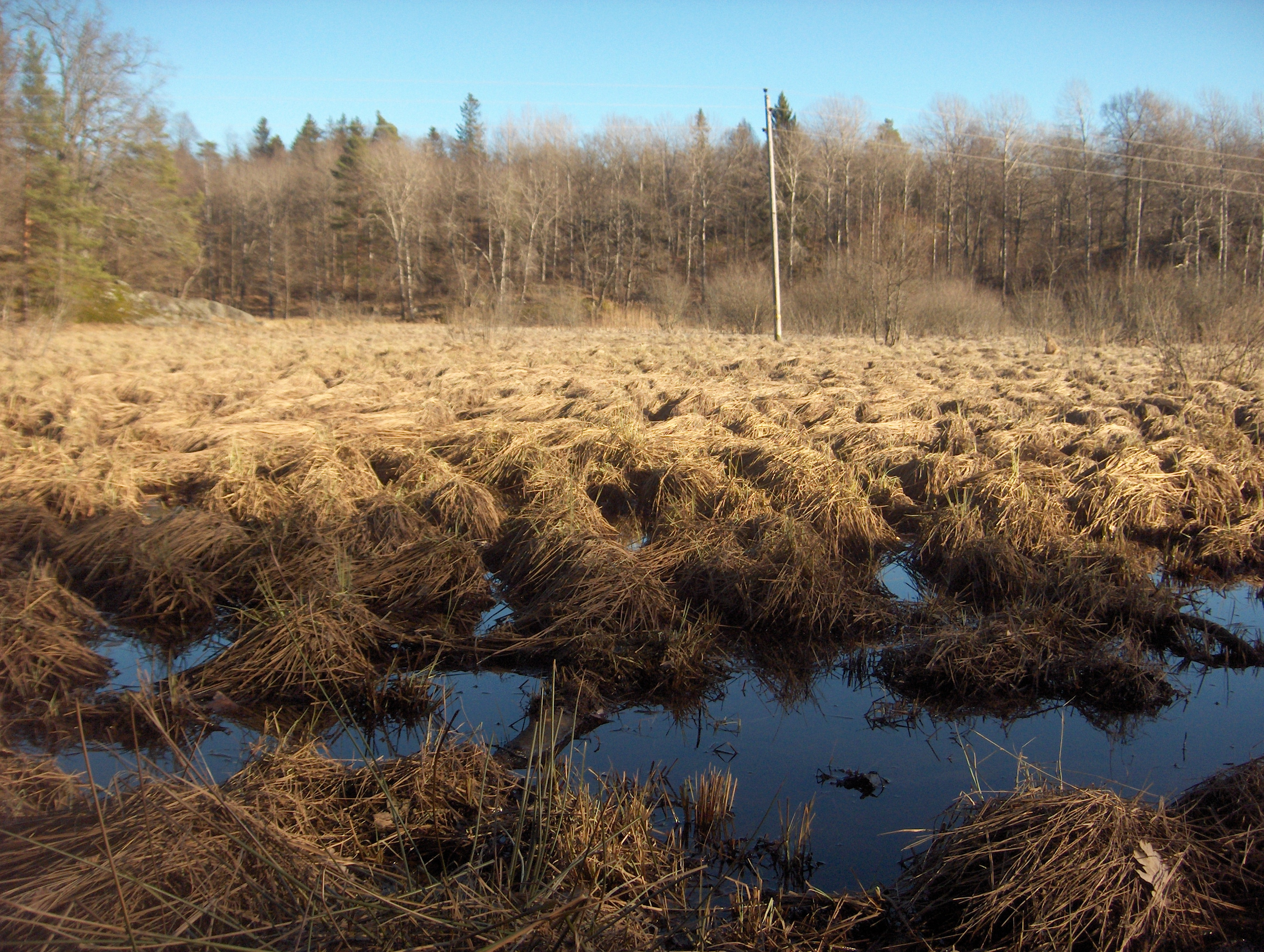
The wetlands surrounding Ågestasjön.

The lake and the wetlands around it was transformed into a bird protection area in 1976, which means the area is inaccessible to the public from April 15 to July 15 and hunting, hunting equipment, and dogs are prohibited all seasons. Most of the area within a radius of 300 metres from the lake is subject to special restrictions.

Except for birdwatchers, the lake and its surrounding also attracts open-air lovers who use the area for walking, tour skating, and cross-country skiing. Due to the restrictions on visiting the lake in summer, and to the considerable amount of aquatic plants, bathing is not possible in the lake. Additionally, motorboats and fishing are not allowed on the lake.

The lake is surrounded by agricultural lands and a variety of forests, including precious deciduous forest. Near the lake is a golf course and a riding school. Part of the biodiversity in the area is due to the bait animals kept around the lake.

=== Environmental impact ===
Ågestasjön receives nutrients and contaminants from both lakes upstream, the Orlången and Trehörningen, and Ågestasjön's proper catchment area which is rich in nutrients. In the northern end of the lake superficial sediments (0–2 cm) contain high levels of copper, zinc, nickel, lead, cadmium, and Manganese; while the southern part of the lake show high levels of Chromium in deeper sediments (20–22 cm). Overall, levels of heavy metals are considered moderate.

== Flora and fauna ==
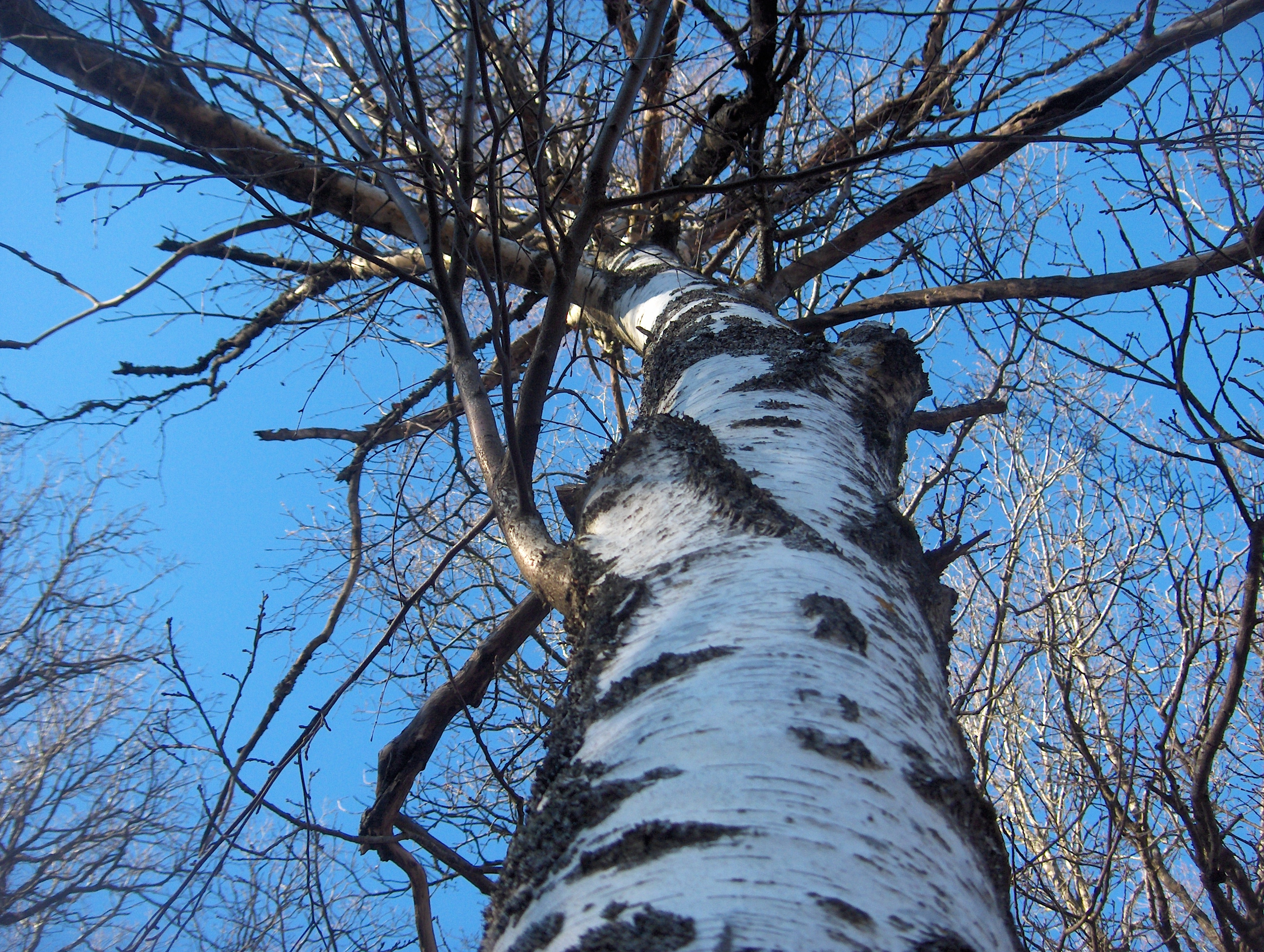
Silver Birch near Ågestasjön.

In 1998, a wide range of aquatic plants were documented in the lake: reed, common club-rush, common bulrush, lesser bulrush, yellow iris, alisma, branched bur-reed, water hemlock, marsh calla, water-soldier, yellow water-lily, white water-lily, broad-leaved pondweed, blunt-leaved pondweed, whorled water-milfoil, rigid hornwort, common bladderwort, pondweed, bog-bean, frogbit, lesser duckweed, greater duckweed, and ivy-leaved duckweed.

Common fishes in the lake includes pike, roach, rudd, tench, bleak, silver bream, carp bream, crucian carp, perch, and ruffe. Of these tench and crucian carp represent the majority of biomass in the lake, while roach and perch dominated in numbers. Large fishes dominate in the lake, which is considered as a sign of presence of carnivores. A considerable variation in sizes of roaches indicates the lake is an important breeding locale for this species. In contrast, perches show a small variation in scale, which is a sign of the lake being dominated by a single generation as individuals fail to reach carnivorous adulthood.

Some 240 bird species have been reported by the lake, which is an important locale for both resting and breeding species. The lake is dominated by some 500 couples of black-headed gulls together with mallards and coots. 5 couples of great crested grebe, 5-10 couples of teal and goldeneye, 5 couples of tufted duck and pochard, a few couples of moorhen and water rail, and single couples of shoveler, gadwall, garganey. A presence of whooper swan dates back to 2004, while regular visitors include marsh harrier (2-3 couples), snipe, and Eurasian woodcock. Occasionally Eurasian bittern and spotted crake are seen by the lake.

There are a dozen couples of northern lapwing and eastern yellow wagtail, together with couples of meadow pipit, whinchat, red-backed shrike, bearded reedling, goshawk, spotted nutcracker, Eurasian wryneck, European honey buzzard, thrush nightingale, long-tailed tit, lesser spotted woodpecker, wood warbler, hawfinch, and Eurasian hobby. In the night time sedge warbler and reed warbler are regularly heard, while grasshopper warbler, river warbler, marsh warbler, and great reed warbler are reported now and then. Osprey are regularly seen fishing in the lake. Uncountable numbers of resting species are reported by the lake, including various swans, hawks, eagles, cormorants, and sparrows.

Both the lakes upstream and downstream suffered of crayfish plague in the late 1970s, which makes it likely Ågestasjön was affected too. As signal crayfish was introduced in the neighbouring lakes recently, it is assumed they are also present in Ågestasjön. Amphibians are represented by moor frog, common frog, true toad, and smooth newt. There are several bats present by the lake: northern bat, Daubenton's bat, common noctule, and whiskered bat. Otters were present in the lake until the 1960s and were spotted nearby in 2003.

== See also ==
- Geography of Stockholm
- Ågesta
- Ågesta Nuclear Plant
