= Flaten =

Lake in Stockholm, Sweden

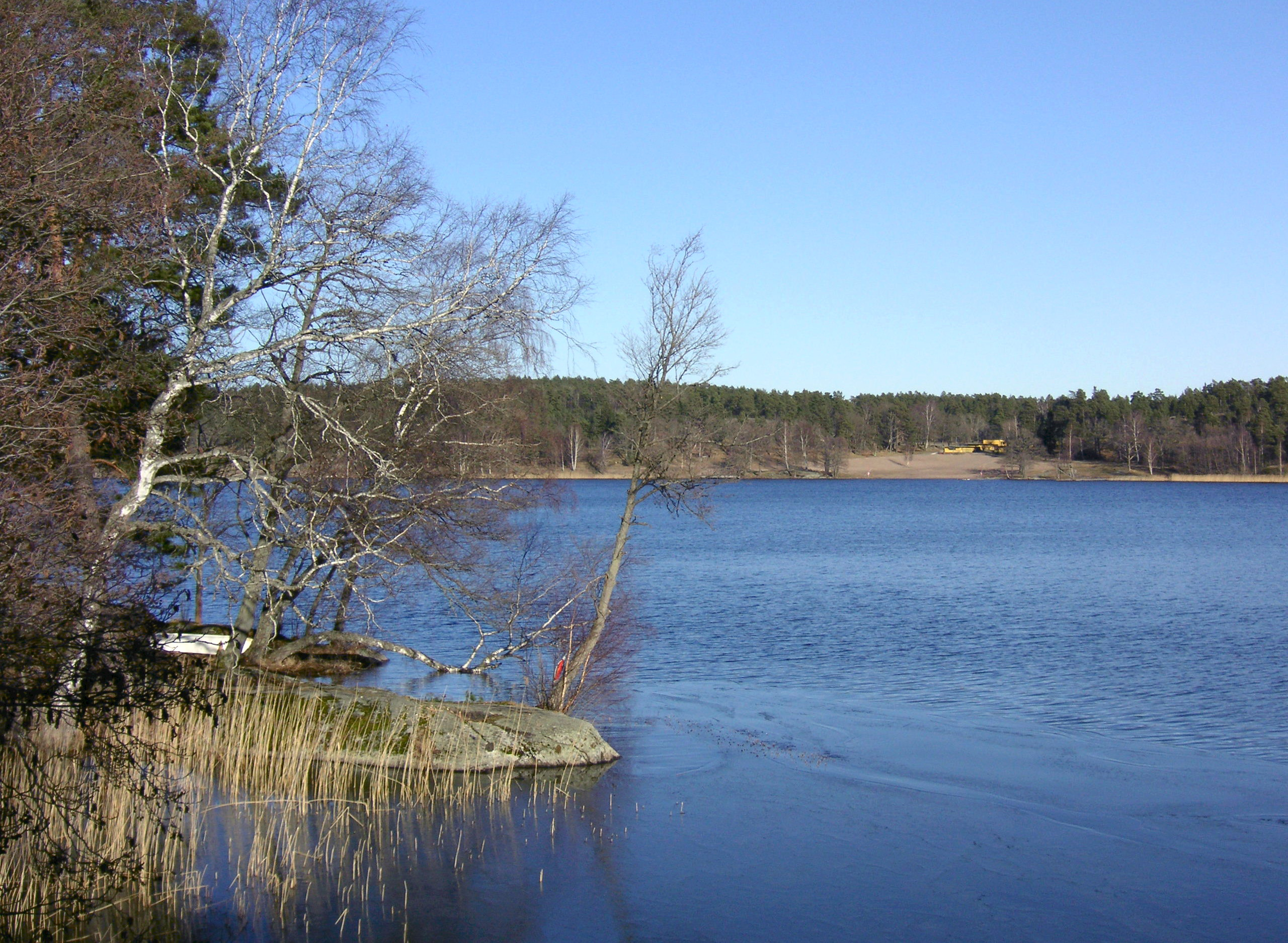

- Location within Stockholm
- Location: southern Stockholm
- Coordinates: 59°14′59″N 18°9′13″E
- Primary inflows: Flatenån
- Primary outflows: Drevviken
- Catchment area: 403 ha (1,000 acres)
- Basin countries: Sweden
- Surface area: 63 ha (160 acres)
- Average depth: 7.4 m (24 ft)
- Max. depth: 13.6 m (45 ft)
- Water volume: 4.56×10^{6} m^{3} (3,700 acre⋅ft)
- Residence time: 4 years
- Shore length^{1}: 5,460 m (17,910 ft) (including island)
- Surface elevation: 21.9 m (72 ft)
- Islands: 1 (0.04 ha or 4,300 sq ft)
- Settlements: Stockholm
- ^{1} Shore length is not a well-defined measure.

Flaten is a lake in southern Stockholm, Sweden, located just north of Lake Drevviken. The name is also used for the surrounding area and the nature reserve created there in 2007.

Flaten has the best water quality of all lakes around the Swedish capital and is highly popular for bathing and angling. The surrounding area is dominated by forests, with allotment-gardens and some industrial activities located north of the lake. Algal bloom occasionally occurs in spring.

== Catchment area ==
The undulating wooded grounds of the catchment area are considered as of significant natural value and, through the location within a nature reserve and proximity to Stockholm, also of significant recreational value. A scenic ravine is found by the southern end of the lake while most nearby settlements are located north of it. The area is used for various open-air activities including walking, bathing, camping, canoeing, and fishing. The area is a fine example of the fissure-valley landscape prevalent in the entire Stockholm County, featuring elevated flat rocks separated by valleys with oaks and spruces, some of which can be several hundreds years old. In the catchment area are also three allotment-gardens and the residential area Skarpnäck. A bathe is located on the eastern shore. The catchment area for groundwater is much larger than that for stormwater.

=== Environmental influence ===
In summer, when the lake is stratified, bottom layers suffer of oxygen depletion causing release of phosphorus. Treatment with aluminium chloride in 2000, however, greatly reduced the amount of leaking phosphorus. Most of the surface runoff reaching Flaten comes from a ditch (Flatendiket) stretching a kilometre to empty in the northern end of the lake where two sedimentation basins reduces the amount of pollutants reaching the lake. The ditch also receives stormwater from local settlements rich in nutrients and from the only road in the catchment area which contains metals and PAHs. Occasionally, the ditch therefore transports waste water to the lake which the available caissons mostly fails to treat properly. However, pipes from the bathe lead to a local sewage disposal plant, and, additionally, the catchment area was reduced by some 20 per cent in 1978 when stormwater from the graveyard Skogskyrkogården was guided past the lake, which decreased pollution but also increased lake retention time.

== Flora and fauna ==
In summers, phytoplankton algae are dominated by cyanobacteria and some carapace flagellates. Other species have been abundant, but today only a single nitrogen fixating algae is present in the lake. During winters and springs, Planktothrix agardhii adopt a red colour which occasionally colours the lake in shades of red and brown. Larger zooplankton include water fleas (Bosmina) and copepods (Daphnia); and smaller species, rotifers, seem to have increased during the later part of the 1990s. An inventory of aquatic plants in 1997 resulted in a list of 13 species, most commonly spring quillwort, awlwort, shoreweed, and needle spike-rush. The shores of Flaten are covered with bog-myrtle. Trailing plants have occasionally been abundant near the bathe.

A documentation of lake bed fauna in 1997 registered 68 species, of which fourteen were freshwater gastropods commonly found around Stockholm and five were dragonflies. Notable catches included European stream valvata (Valvata piscinalis) and duck mussel. Common fishes are perch, roach, and silver bream, with bigger variations in population for carp bream, northern pike, tench, bleak, ruffe, and zander (notwithstanding attempts to introduce the latter). Crayfish have been successfully introduced. Thirteen breeding bird pairs were documented in 1994 of which the black-throated diver is considered the most important, even though the species is sensitive to interference so breeding might be challenging. Four of five amphibians with a natural habitat in the Stockholm area are found by the lake, as were four species of bats.

== See also ==
- Geography of Stockholm
- Lakes of Sweden
