= Bromsten =

Urban district in Stockholm, Sweden

Coordinates: 59°23′1.14″N 17°55′0.7″E

Bromsten (Swedish pronunciation: [ˈbrɔ̂mːsteːn]) is a middle-class district of northwestern Stockholm and belongs to the Spånga-Tensta borough. The ruins of an ancient hill fort located in the area are believed to be the source of the district's name.

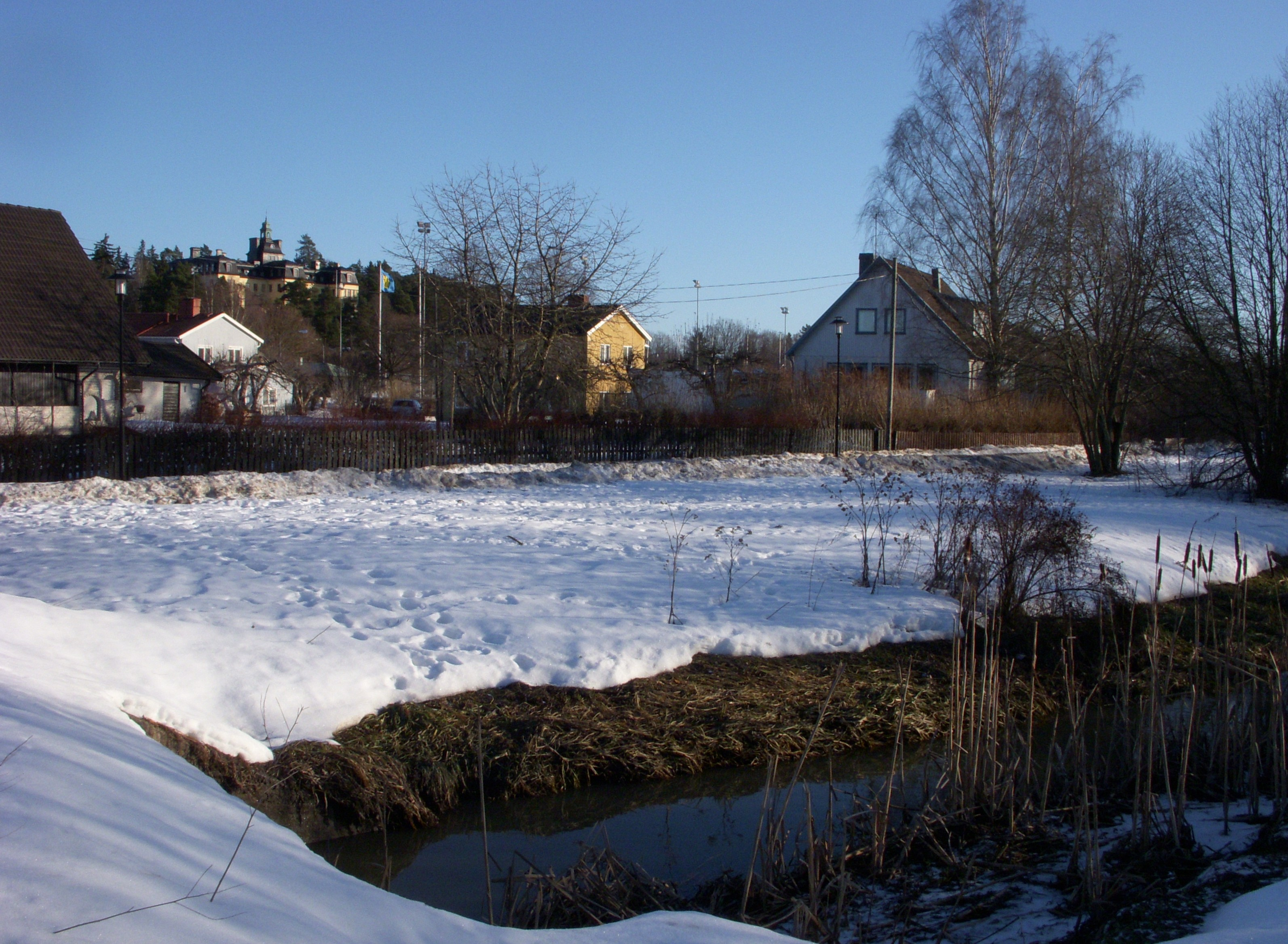
