= Ulvsjön =

Lake in Nacka Municipality, Sweden

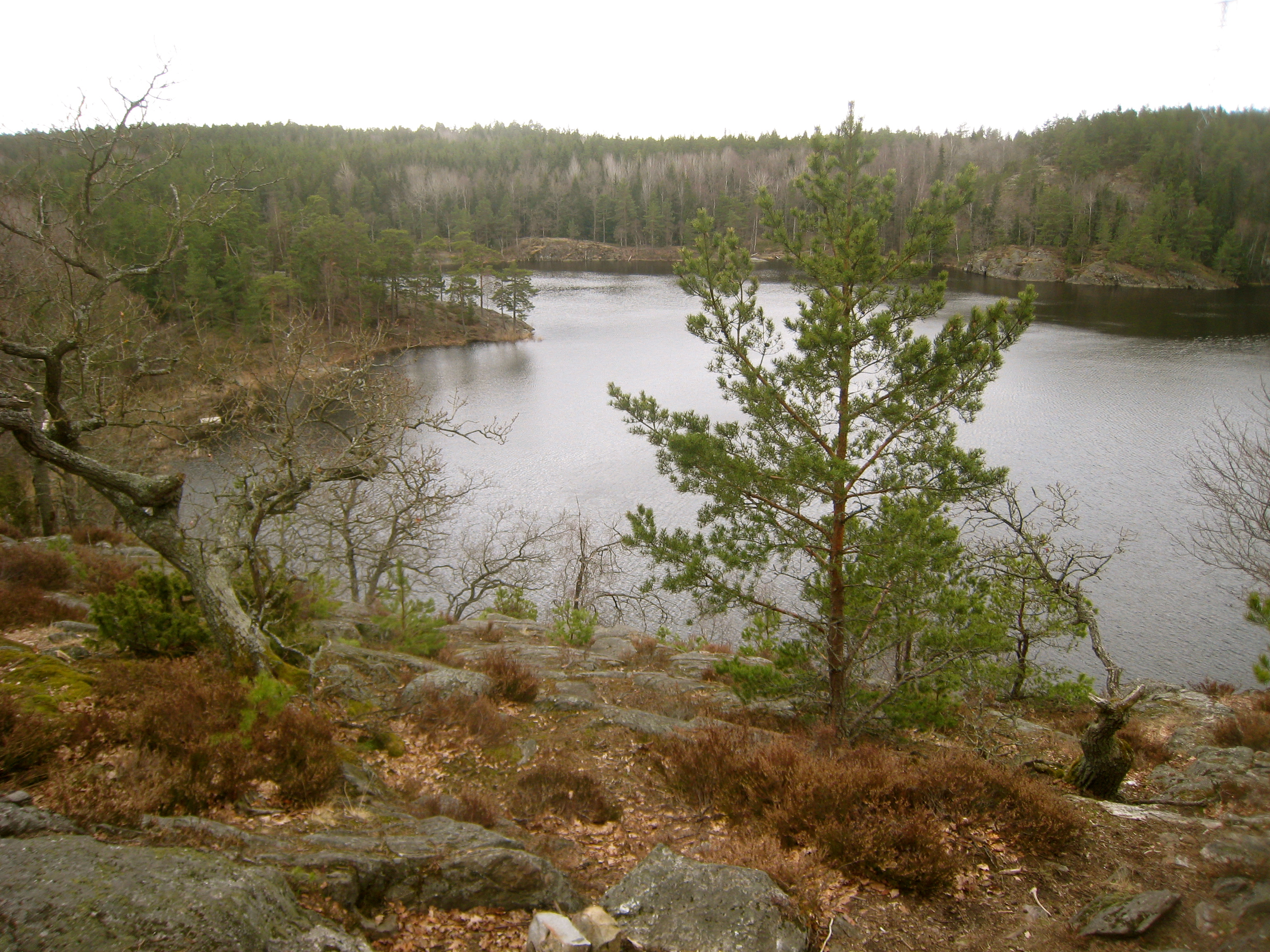
- Lake Ulvsjön

- Location within Stockholm
- Coordinates: 59°16′38″N 18°09′47″E
- Basin countries: Sweden

Ulvsjön is a lake in Stockholm County, Södermanland, Sweden. It is a common spot for locals and tourists alike to jump off the 5 meter cliffs into the water.
