= Dammtorpssjön =

Lake in Sweden

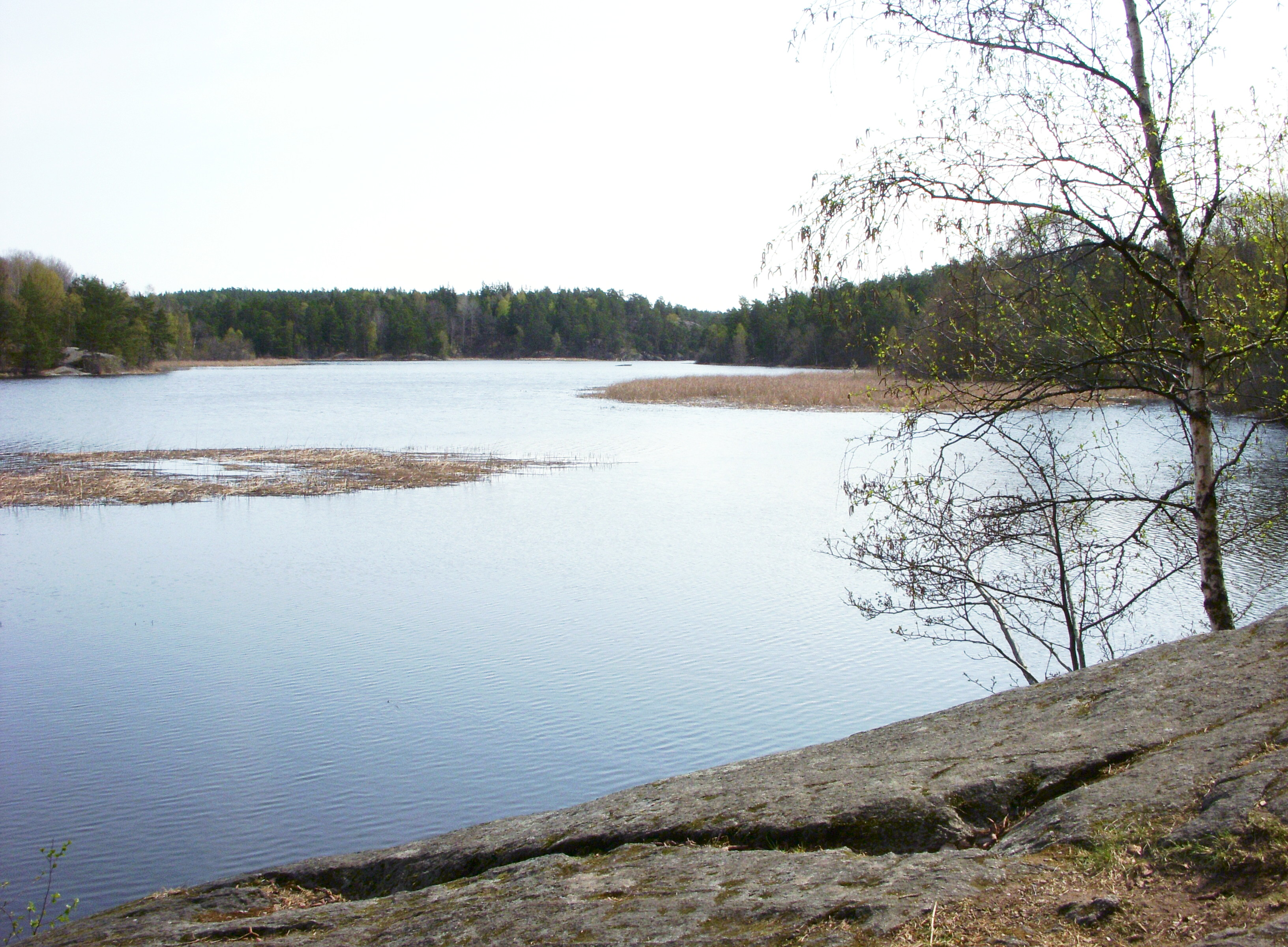

- Location within Stockholm
- Coordinates: 59°17.34′N 18°8.85′E
- Basin countries: Sweden

Dammtorpssjön is a lake in Stockholm County, Södermanland, Sweden.
