= Söderbysjön =

Lake in Sweden

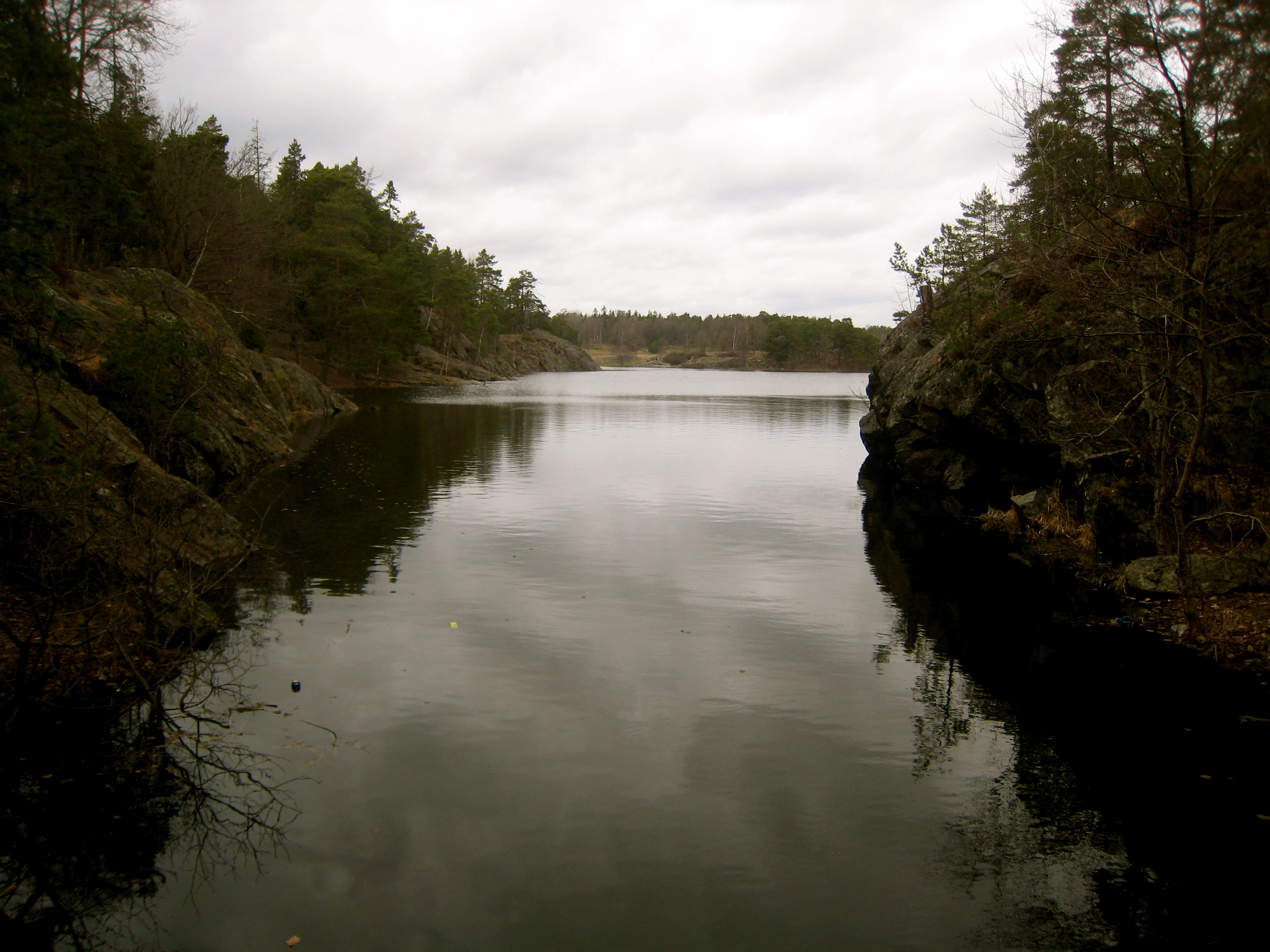

- Location within Stockholm
- Coordinates: 59°16′54″N 18°09′01″E
- Basin countries: Sweden

Söderbysjön is a lake in Stockholm County, Södermanland, Sweden.
