= Källtorpssjön =

Lake in Stockholm County, Sweden

- Location within Stockholm
- Coordinates: 59°17′33.1″N 18°09′48.4″E
- Basin countries: Sweden

Källtorpssjön is a lake in the town of Älta, located within Stockholm County, Södermanland, Sweden.
