= Järlasjön =

Lake in Stockholm County, Sweden

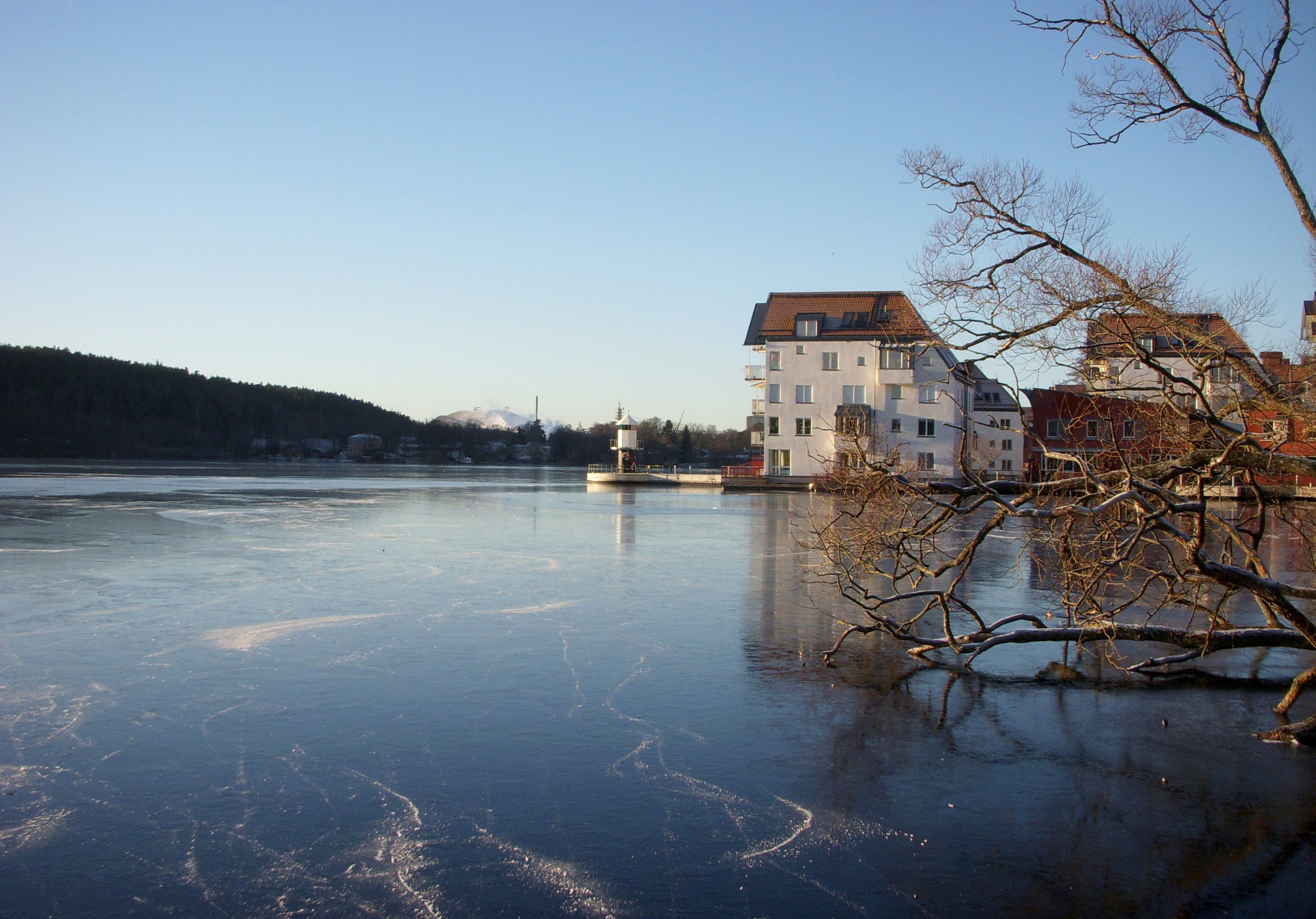
- A near-frozen Lake Järlasjön

- Location within Stockholm
- Coordinates: 59°18′N 18°09′E
- Basin countries: Sweden

Järlasjön is a lake in Stockholm County, Södermanland, Sweden.
