= Bruatorpsån =

Bruatorpsån Torsåsån

Location
- Country: Sweden
- County: Kalmar
- Municipality: Torsås

Physical characteristics
- Mouth: Kalmar Strait
  - location: Söderåkra
  - coordinates: 56°26′11″N 16°06′54″E
  - elevation: 0 m (0 ft)
- Basin size: 430.1 km^{2} (166.1 sq mi)

Bruatorpsån or Torsåsån is a river in Sweden. Almost the entire catchment area lies in Torsås Municipality in Kalmar County.
