= Treaty of Brömsebro =

Treaty of Brömsebro may refer to one of two treaties between Denmark-Norway and Sweden:

- Treaty of Brömsebro (1541)
- Treaty of Brömsebro (1645) also known as the Peace of Brömsebro
