= Chronicle of the Expulsion of the Greyfriars =

The Chronicle of the Expulsion of the Greyfriars (Latin: Cronica seu brevis processus in causa expulsionis fratrum minoritarum de suis cenobiis provincie Dacie, Danish: Krønike on Gråbrødrenes Udjagelse, or Gråbrødrenes Fordrivelseskrønike) is a historical writing on the Reformation in Denmark between 1527 and 1532 when the Franciscans were forced to leave Denmark.

== Introduction ==
The Chronicle of the Expulsion of the Greyfriars records the systematic hounding of the Franciscans out of Denmark between 1527 and 1532. In all, 28 towns drove the friars from their friaries, often with the approval and encouragement of Frederik I of Denmark and his son, Duke Christian, later King Christian III. The chronicle describes the expulsion of the Greyfriars from 15 of them and mentions one more in passing.

The chronicle's author or more likely authors, Franciscan Friar Erasmus Olai (Rasmus Olsen) and Friar Jacob Jensen of Næstved Friary, wrote an account of the tribulations of the monks and condemned the cruelty of those who drove them from their houses. The chronicle is not objective; it is vehemently anti-Lutheran, and certainly lionizes those who were being persecuted, but the details the authors provide give first-hand insight into a turbulent time period in Danish history.

== Introductory Prayer ==
Concerning the Greyfriar's expulsion.

A prayer against the heretics and the devil's schemes.

O Lord, God of the heavenly hosts, turn and look down from heaven specifically with a compassionate eye and see specifically our tribulation which we have suffered for our sins, and visit this vine, namely the Greyfriar's Order.

And bring to an end (our tribulation), which (he who) sits at your right hand, even the only Begotten Son, Jesus Christ, because it now in great part is fallen away; this vine, namely the holy order, is grounded upon the son of Man even the Virgin's son, who established yourself, even upon the sure rock, Christs. This vine I say is being fooled by heretics and false preachers, and set afire by trials and errors and undermined, even torn away from the true faith. Therefore, I ask, Lord, God of the hosts of heaven, that these false preachers might perish by the threat and indignation from your angry countenance, through Jesus Christ, our Lord. This (as mentioned) in Psalmus 79 (Psalm 80).

== The Chronicle ==
Now follows a chronicle or a short account of the case of the Greyfriars expulsion from their friaries in the Province of Denmark. First an explanation of that:

'God's judgement is a deep abyss.' (Psalm 36:6) How true the words of the psalmist are; one can all too often see in our (time). O the pains,(of this) all too often unhappy and storm-filled age where one can see the Lutheran party's miserable expectations take hold. They have forsaken the (appointed) interpreters' true explanation of the holy scriptures, so that they with cunning and slyness and in a quarrelsome manner wrest the scriptures. They become stiff-necked by holding fast to their error (which) they drank in at first, to condemnation for themselves and for others.

Because their lying master, Martin Luther, has asserted that faith alone was enough to save and that one had only to see to it that (faith) grew. But works, he asserted, were done only for dead flesh and to edify (one's) neighbor, but not to righteousness or salvation. Nor would there be any reward hereafter for mankind's holy works, but that works were only a preparation for faith which all the righteous were given, and taken away from the wicked.

That interpretation is and has done much to foster laxity, O, that can one see more of in our time than is necessary to produce evidence of without long and extensive research. For many who before burned brightly in their devotion and zeal for the faith and despite their determination to never to forsake it, cooled, and went out completely with this devilish wind gust.

For many who at one time were devoted under the holy father Francis' rule and stood like Lebanon's cedars, hurtled down in that they gave way before the misfortunes, like shrubbery on flat fields (give way) before the force of the wind. The majority ending their days in a very unhappy manner. Nearly all Denmark's great nobles were led away by their bad examples and pestilent dogma. And our order's poor brothers who are steadfast in the faith and preach against the Lutheran party's doctrines. They Greyfriars) are persecuted without compassion and against all just laws and driven from their friaries. And they (the fallen brothers) take away the alms and remove the religious decorations from the friaries, which property they took which (belonged to the friaries) and then use them for worldly purposes, thinking that they bring God an offering from the heart.

For so they are taught by the heretic preachers. They assert that the offering of mass which has always been celebrated and which should be celebrated in the church is so abominable and so pernicious that is a wonder that such priests of the mass are not by God's punishing judgement swallowed up alive by the earth. their supposed heresy lifted from them whose god is (their) belly. Among them Mogens Gjo can be seen who was the first, he who in the most unjust manner drove our poor order's brothers from many places.

== Chapter 1 Concerning the Friary in Flensborg ==
But in the year 1528 after the Saviour of the world's incarnation (on) the second day after Palm Sunday^{1}, the above-mentioned Mogens Gjø, and his priest by the name of Svend came to Flensborg (in order to), with the citizens help, drive our brethren out of that town's friary. He and a considerably large host of citizens trespassed into our friary and demanded the keys from the Guardian, Brother Stig Nielsen, who came from Skåne, from the town of Lund. He delivered the keys of the friary immediately to him (the priest, Svend). And he (Stig Nielsen) and the Vice-Guardian, Brother Andreas Hoffmand and another Vice-Guardian Brother Johannes Johansen who was from Flensborg, received each 4 guilder^{2} in travel money, which they accepted.

But thereafter came the turn of lay brother, Hans, who as the master of the cellars with responsibility for the common food stores. From him they demanded the keys, but he assured them that he could not deliver the keys without ruining the beer, which had recently been put into the cellar, and said that he would retain them (the keys) for a time and serve Mogens Gjø faithfully if what the priest, Svend, had said was true, that all the friars would be expelled from Denmark within the year. When that assurance was given, he went in to the cook, Brother Andreas Gad. He praised his (Hans') opinion and answered that he would do the same. The presiding brethren received permission to remain in the friary until the next day and a few of the court servants were set to keep watch over things. But early the next day there came the noble knight, Herr Wolf, who at that time was governor of Flensborg Castle to the friary. He had heard the sorrowful rumours about our friary and asked the guardian if they were to have a new guardian. He answered that such was the decision. For they had had as superintendent a citizen from Vejle whose house had burned down. Herr Wolf chased him (the previous superintendent) out of the friary and returned the keys to the Guardian^{2}. After these events, the brethren remained in their friary until Trinity Sunday and served God. They deposited the money they had received when they were to have been expelled, in the town. Then the subordinate brothers received 3 guilder in Danish money except holy Brother Mathias who was a priest. He moved to Svendborg Friary and there served God a short time. Later he travelled from there left the order and ended his life in the Baltic where he drowned.

On Trinity Sunday^{3} when the brethren in the choir had begun to sing the Kyrie eleison the aforementioned priest, Svend came back and invaded the friary together with a crowd of citizens to drive the brothers out immediately. He had with him a royal warrant wherein it was written that the citizens should assist the aforementioned Mogens Gjø's priest to force the brothers out. But the brethren refused to travel away before they ate, so the citizens remained with the brothers while they ate, and after dinner, they chased the brothers out of the friary^{4}.

^{1} Palm Sunday is the Sunday before Easter, which means that date varies from mid-March to early April.

^{2} Guilden (singular) or guilder (plural) was the common name for large silver coins in use at the time. One and a half guilder equalled a thaler or daler, two and a half guilder was equal to a riksthaler. Dalers were the common currency in Denmark until the 19th century when the krone was introduced.

^{3} The Guardian or Father Guardian was the leader of the local friary assisted by one or more Vice-Guardians. Other named positions in the chronicle include, cook, porter, and cellar master.

^{3} Trinity Sunday is the Sunday after Pentecost. Since it is dated from Easter, the date varies from late May to early June. The Sundays between Trinity Sunday and Advent in November are numbered from Trinity Sunday. e.g. Third Sunday after Trinity

^{4} The Danish word 'kloster' is used for all monastic religious houses, equivalent to 'convent' in English which furthermore makes a distinction between friary, priory, abbey, nunnery. Since information about many religious houses in Denmark before the Reformation is lacking, the word in the Chronicle is translated as friary. The only exception listed in the Chronicle is Antvorskov Abbey.

^{5} Royal warrants for expulsion were often the deciding factor which forced the closure of the friaries. Frederik I publicly tried an even-handed approach suggesting that Catholic and Lutherans share churches, which brought condemnation from both parties. Either on his own or by persuasion from local authorities, he wrote letters authorizing the expulsion of Franciscans from their friaries. He usually offered money to the monks which on his part was an inducement to leave peacefully either to travel or to abandon the monastic life. On the Franciscans' part, the offer of money was viewed as a cynical attempt to subvert their vows of poverty, to accept the king's money for personal use or gain was outside the 'rule' and a betrayal of their basic vows.

Frederiks I's royal warrants specifically targeted Franciscan houses, no other order was so treated, even by Christian III who was thoroughly Lutheran and very anti-Catholic. On the whole, once it was clear the Lutherans would prevail, Danes took a level-headed approach to terminating monasteries. In 1536 when Denmark became officially Lutheran, the monasteries, all of them, were dissolved. The monks were turned out and either travelled to Germany or other monastic houses or simply took off their habits and became ordinary Danes. Nuns were often permitted to remain in their nunneries until their deaths and provision was made for them by local noble houses. In a few instances remote religious houses stayed open for a year or two, but in the end not a single monastic house survived until they were re-established in recent times.

== Chapter 2 Concerning the Friary at Viborg ==
But in the year 1527 there came a certain lapsed (one) of the Order of St John's^{1} Abbey at Antvorskov, Master Hans Tausen^{2}, who until that time had borne his monk's habit^{3} or (in other words) his clothing of virtue and began in his priory's church to preach the Lutheran heresy. And that day when he finished preaching, he removed his habit in the church which he had upon the pulpit and left there together with the citizens who had heard his preaching. They went to St. John's Church in the same town and there he gathered the people often who would hear his infectious Lutheran heresy and pour out his poisoned tongue's oaths.

And then day after day (he preached) his disease-infested lessons, dripping with error great and small; he encouraged the citizens that our brethren should be expelled from there (the priory) during his Luther lessons, and that they should establish a school. St Johns' Church was not large enough for the numbers (of citizens) who wanted to hear the new and unheard of teaching. They asked if the church at our friary could be opened for his sect's preaching in the afternoon. But since that couldn't be permitted, the citizens in that town sent a letter to his royal highness in which they asked for permission to tear down the parish churches in that town because there were too many of them, namely 12 (in number). They also asked his royal highness if they might obtain the Blackfriars (Dominican) and Greyfriars (Franciscan) churches, so that instead of the many churches in the town they could meet together to hold the new lesson services there, and so tear down the other churches. When they received permission to (do this), they seized our friary church. But even before that the brethren were used to preaching before noon and the heretics in the afternoon by which they put many difficulties and obstacles in the brothers' way. First and foremost because they pushed (their way) through an open door into the friary and brought their preacher into our church. And on the Feast of All Saints^{4} their preacher spoke twice in the afternoon and allowed six of their psalms to be sung by those present. Whereby they prohibited us from holding vespers and vigils for the dead which the brethren were used to sing.

But later they also took the church from the brethren, so that they might conduct their songs of praise and masses in the chapel at the cloister nearly the whole year through. But when the aforementioned citizens saw that the brethren refused to leave their friary, they stationed four soldiers in our friary and commanded the brethren under direction of the royal warrant to pay the cost of upkeep for the soldiers. But the Guardian Niels Tybo, had in the meantime decided to travel to Salling to gather alms. When he had begun his journey and was a mile from the town, there came a message from the brother's own servant to him telling him the sad news and asked him to return immediately. When he returned, and found out what had happened in the friary, he was resigned (to the fact) that the soldiers had come into the friary, but he was sadder to have to gather provisions for them.

But one soldier came in before midday and attacked the Guardian, grabbed hold of his collar and struck him with his sword and later attacked the Guardian twice, once with a tankard of beer, the second time with his sword. The brethren in the meantime remained in the friary together with the aforementioned soldiers despite (the fact) that they endured much (that was) not right and many difficulties. One time it happened that two of the soldiers wanted to visit their comrades in Hostenborg. They demanded therefore of the Guardian the friary's wagon. But he determined that it could truly not be allowed because the wagon was used to carry grain to the mill. He rented therefore another wagon in place (of the first) then the Guardian paid for it with the friary's alms money.

And furthermore, when he (the soldier) returned, he began to require of the Guardian just as much money as the wagon had cost otherwise he would let it be known that he had stayed home. Despite this the Guardian would not of his own free will give him (the money), he was at last forced to give him what he wanted. By the end the number of the soldiers grew to 15, and they used up our alms so that there was nothing remaining neither wet nor dry (goods).

The Guardian decided to turn the keys of the friary over to another and travel to the king to complain about the wrongs against him and the brethren, but a town master^{5}, who he had asked to take the keys, counselled him against the journey because it would be dangerous for himself and for the friary brothers if he fled and did not take care of his majesty's servants (the soldiers). The Guardian remained at the friary with the brethren and pawned a chalice to procure their food. But at last the Guardian travelled to Copenhagen to the king and received from him a sealed letter. When it was opened in Viborg and read out in the presence of the citizens, the monks were chased out, but with what right or authority only the Almighty can see and judge. This was all told to me, Brother Jacob (Jensen), by the worthy Father Niels Tybo, at the time the Guardian of the aforementioned Viborg Friary, now Vice-Guardian in Ribe.

^{1} Order of St John Hospitallers was one of the fighting orders that came about as a result of the Crusades. The Hospitallers were especially important to pilgrims and the sick. The Hospitallers operated hospitals, poor houses, and their priories offered space to religious travellers. The priories were supposed to produce a surplus that could be sent to the mother house on the Island of Rhodes to fund similar facilities to pilgrims to the Holy Land. The Hospitallers had several names, including Templars.

^{2} The habit of the Greyfriars consisted of the grey woollen ankle-length gown. A simple cord served as a belt. In inclement weather they might add a matching cowl.

^{3} Hans Tausen was perhaps the most influential individual in the Danish Reformation. He was a monk of the order of St John's Hospitallers and went to study in Augsburg with Martin Luther and came back persuaded that the church needed reform. He preached a Lutheran sermon at Antvorskov Abbey on Good Friday 1525 creating an instant controversy. He was shuttled off to St John's Priory in Viborg to give him time to come to his senses. Instead Viborg became the earliest centre for the Reformation in Denmark as a result of Tausen's fearless preaching. He was named Frederik I's own chaplain to give him some measure of protection. After the Count's Feud and Denmark's becoming officially Lutheran in October 1536, Tausen lost much of his influence and was later Bishop of Ribe for twenty years until his death.

^{4} Feast of All Saints was 1 November the day after All Hallows Eve.

^{5} Danish towns were presided over by the town masters (Danish:borgmestre), a group of wealthy merchants or others who were responsible to carry out local laws. The council, composed of other influential town leaders, served in an advisory capacity to the masters of the town. In the Chronicle individual town masters influenced events of the expulsions, and once the town master decided the monks had to go, it didn't take very long before the friary was dissolved, often with the complicity of the king or his officials.

== Chapter 3 Concerning the Friary in Tønder ==
In 1530 after our Lord Jesus Christ's appearance in the flesh, eight days after the Virgin Mary's Nativity^{1}, when King Frederik, brother to King Hans, who at that time was once King in Denmark, Sweden, and Norway came to Tønder to his castle there. A Lutheran lesson was preached in our friary's holy church, the Church of the Holy Virgin Mary. And after having heard the lesson, the king was walking in the choir, and Niels Tybo who at one time was Guardian of the place went toward his royal highness and asked him as humbly as he could if the brethren might receive permission as before to remain there and serve God. The king turned himself away from him and said that he would announce his decision before he travelled on. A few of the brothers remained a few days at the friary and waited upon the announcement of the king. Because before the king came, the bailiff of the castle had taken over the friary except the choir, dormitory, and a little room to eat in and brought the castle's provisions there^{1}.

When the king stood ready to travel, the Father Guardian went again to the king and asked as humbly as possible if they could remain there and in the usual way serve the Lord God. The king answered that he could not permit it any longer because the lord of the castle wouldn't have enough room to store his things if they were to remain there as well, and the friary walls lay too close to the castle, so it would be torn down. The Father Guardian replied that the brethren would under no conditions trouble the bailiff of the caste or prevent him in anything, if they (could) just stay there and serve God. The king answered that there would be space to accomplish that in another place. When the king had ridden away, the bailiff of the castle took control of everything that had belonged to the friary and chased the monks away. They only retained their clothing and two pairs of horses which he gave to them to carry away the old and weak.

^{1} The Nativity of the Virgin Mary was celebrated on 8 September.

^{2} The arrangement of Franciscan friaries was laid out in a similar pattern. The buildings arranged in a rough rectangle included a church, upstairs dormitory, refectory, quarters for servants or lay people, cemeteries, and cellars. Two mention hospitals or places for the sick. Chapter houses or rooms seem conspicuously absent.

== Chapter 4 Concerning the Friary in Malmø ==
This is the account about the inhuman way the expulsion of the Greyfriars from their friary in Malmø took place. In 1527 after the Saviour of the world's incarnation, there came to Malmø a certain priest who was shameless and filled with the heretic's usual errors, Claus Bødker he was called, the barrel maker. He went about spewing forth the most overwhelming evil. He had been ordained a priest in the Diocese of Lund, but since he had insufficient knowledge of the scriptures either secular or spiritual, he went to Copenhagen, where the study of theology bloomed, but where it (the study) was more eager about Lutheran than the Catholic theology. There he learned the errors, though secretly, because the teaching of Lutheran falsehoods had not yet been sowed in public.

And so this priest, Claus Bødker, filled with unclean falsehoods, also infected others with them. He went several times up into the pulpit in the greatest churches, specifically the church of the highly praised Virgin Mary and preached with enormous pride, for he had a beautiful and resounding voice. But when the Bishop of Roskilde, a man of great and earnest Catholic faith, discovered that now and again (Bødker) spoke disparagingly about the people of the church and spread abroad the errors of the Lutheran party's falsehoods, he forbade him (Bødker) from preaching from any pulpit in the Diocese (of Roskilde). Afterwards it so happened that Jorgen Møntmester in Malmø heard a rumour about it. He was himself, though secretly, full of the Lutheran teaching's errors. He got the priest to come himself to Malmø and told him his secret desire. He (Møntmester) promised him (Bødker) that he should carry out his desire on the most faithful, specifically to poison Malmø with the Lutheran heresy to hatred against all of them (brothers in the monastery).

He demanded then a place where he could preach in the town, but the town master, Jørgen Møntmester, could not yet permit it, the Lutheran heresy was namely not yet so strong or well known in Denmark, as we now see it. But (Claus Bødker) received permission to preach outside the town in a green meadow in which there lay an old chapel. Thereto nearly the whole population of the town went to hear the new and unfamiliar preaching. And he preached to them powerfully and mixed in but little or none of his heretical errors.

This turncoat of a man understood himself well enough this evil counsel that one cannot in the beginning blurt out the pure poison, but little by little get his hearer's ears used to it with sweet honey. But when they heard the preaching out in the field, they praised his efforts and talent to preach God's word. They thought it an injustice that such a wonder should not be allowed within the walls as if he was suspect. When there came a complaint that the grass around the chapel was (being) trampled down, they moved their wonder into the town, first to the Chapel of the Holy Spirit. There he remained for a long time (creating) in between small irritations of his heresy and received protectors and defenders of his preaching. But at last there came so many to hear his lessons that the chapel could not hold the crowds of people.

Furthermore, he began at that time to spread his teaching's insane poison more openly after he had gathered to himself more courage because of the support of so many. His followers and protectors number and daring (grew) day by day. He lit with his lessons the celebration by many (though without understanding Romans 10:2). He went then to the holy church of St. Peter and asked the priest there, whose name was Henrik, if the door of the church could be opened for them, for instance after noon, so that holy and pure word of God could be heard there, though the priest would retain his rights and his authority over the church.

There assembled then daily a great gathering from the town as if it was the most cheerful play and there this heretic spoke most shamelessly against all the church's true doctrines. Though he had had almost a year ago been driven out by the Archbishop of Lund's (Aage Sparre's) order, but he had taken up with a lapsed (monk) of the Order of the Holy Ghost, one Johannes Urnarius, also called Hans Spandemager.

Those two went to Haderslev and were filled with Danish hymns and the Lutheran heresy's poison, next they came to Malmø, encouraged by the king's letter of immunity and went up and down (the region) undermining the altars, sent priests fleeing, and destroyed chapels near St Peter the Apostle's Church. There the heretic priest, Claus set up a profane altar, namely a table lifted far above the ground where he occasionally celebrated his communion. It was in the end destroyed, and the profane altar which still stands there today was set up, but the pictures and the altar pictures were thrown out, cut to pieces, destroyed and burned and then the parish priest was given a compensation amount and was installed as pastor for the whole town's religious life.

Now we follow the plan further whereby he drove the brethren out of the friary. In the first year of his preaching the heretic, Claus, began small, though groundless, attacks on the brethren with his poisonous tongue like a spear, When the brethren held a burial for one or another he paid particular attention to their words and after the burial lesson came to quarrel with them about his heresy.

It so happened that one time when Brother Jacob, the Vice-Guardian with moderation had preached God's word, that this heretic followed him to the friary's gate. When they had both arrived there, the heretic, Claus, asked Brother Jacob what it meant to do penance. At first Brother Jacob kept his mouth closed, sure that to answer such a crazy man was pointless, and in the end he replied with these words of St Paul, "for as ye have yielded your limbs servants to uncleanness and to iniquity unto iniquity even so now yield your limbs servants to righteousness unto holiness." What is that? asked Brother Jacob. "Listen," he said to all those who stood about, "if this heretic, Claus, spends three days with a scourge, and prays, so he ought in his own words to do penance by fasting three days upon bread and water."

That did not sound good in his (Claus') ears because he wanted go to other places with his preaching. The heretic stood there blushing through and through without knowing which way to turn to escape from the conversation. In the meantime Brother Gabriel, the Guardian, heard this from inside and walked out and asked why Brother Jacob permitted himself to join with such ignorant and insane heretics.

So the attacks and the reproaches directed towards the aforementioned heretic and his followers and especially against the aforementioned Brother Jacob during the time of the plague (even) in the cemetery. They called him now and again a deceiver, at other times a blind man and a stubborn man, but he taught always openly the truth, thanks be to God's merciful help.

And then upon a time Brother Jacob who was gathered with others in the church in the aforesaid town, namely in St George's Chapel, at the day of consecration for that holy place after he had preached courageously the truth about faith and works, after the lesson and he was about to go out of the door of the church, another heretic broke in, it was Urnarius, the same Hans Spandemager, lapsed from the Order of the Holy Spirit who had gathered a great crowd of people in the area to the south and then proceeded to the friary. He broke in and demanded that he (the Guardian), if there was any courage in him, should debate with him about the scriptures.

Brother Jacob answered that he would be glad to debate before his lord the Archbishop and others who were experienced with scripture. But when the other and his followers pushed harder upon him, Brother Jacob stopped his walk a moment and wanted to hear his question. So he (Claus) asked him (Brother Jacob), "What is a good work? Give me an example!" Brother Jacob replied in this manner, "To fast for a good causes is a good work." But it did not please the heretic to hear that, because he (Brother Jacob) proved it satisfactorily from Matthew chapter six.

So the heretic and his followers drew themselves back. In the daytime they were always present at the lessons of the brethren which they paid attention to so they could trap them in their words. But when they could not find grounds to silence the brethren in their lessons, they compiled at length a few imagined and misunderstood accusations with which they damaged the reputation of the brethren or whipped up the people against them. Furthermore, there were some who instigated an utter and furious riot in the church against the aforementioned Brother Jacob, the Vice-Guardian and one time against Brother Gabriel, the Guardian. On one occasion just after noon when that heretic, Claus Bødker, the town's persecutor noticed especially that Brother Jacob and Brother Kristoffer Mathiesen were away, he went into our friary church and there he began to preach, where he barked like a dog against the brothers most shamelessly with his impure nonsense.

But then Brother Kristoffer came from the bath just as the heretic finished his lesson. He went immediately up onto the pulpit and explained from holy writ that the brethren were not guilty of that which he had accused them. But when he went down, the heretic stood up once again and thereafter (by) Brother Kristoffer. So it continued the whole day until vespers^{4} just at five o'clock, they took turns preaching; Brother Kristoffer three times and the heretic twice.

Shortly before this tumultuous time namely in 1529 after the Saviour of the world's incarnation near the Feast of the Purification of the Virgin Mary^{2} there came a preacher to the town especially learned in the heretics wrong teaching, Brother Frans Lector or Luther-Frans he was called. He had been of the Carmelite order and had been recently driven out of his teaching position in Copenhagen by the shouting and crying of the canons. He assured with sneaky underhandedness that he would preach God's word pure and clean and that he would remove the disunity among the citizens that had arisen because of the preacher's differences (of opinion), but he would not go up into the pulpit until he had received a preaching licence from the archbishop. He also travelled to Lund to obtain a preaching licence from Archbishop Aage, and he was received in an especially friendly fashion, as one who would be the truth's preacher in Malmø; who would set all falsehoods back onto the correct path. And so the superintendent of the honourable Lund church Master Aage Jepsen gave this Frans four or six guilder to cover his expenses. The mentioned Luther-Frans, the false apostle, promised him also as uprightly as possible to preach God's word.

"Your shoemaker (and)your barrel maker, and scripture shapers are they not filled to the brim with all possible trickery for disputation in which you have (involved) yourselves. I wonder if you have won over the whole of the papal clergy? I call you a weak herd of cattle!" said Brother Jacob. But the citizens of Malmø who feared the destruction of the city because of their brothers' secret masses chased at last the brethren away from the choir. Though Jørgen Møntmester told the brothers to hold services in another place namely in the vestry, though with the condition that they themselves at God's judgement should stand to answer for these 'ungodly masses' as he called them. O what a sunshine clear answer from the city's wise leader. He didn't figure that that type of person's adultery meant much, but to prevent the service of God after the holy Catholic Church's usage is so criminal that one shudders for day of judgement. O how they strain at a gnat and swallow a camel.

Such a great abhorrence for the celebration of the mass was there among the citizens of Malmø that they drove Brother Johannes Plov away from the altar with the casting of stones and shouting when he was celebrating the mass. There was also at one time a pile of stones found under the pulpit; gathered together to be used as ammunition. Then their hate grew daily and their minds were filled with mischief, which was their soul's sickness, that focused all their energy upon the ways they could discover to get the brethren to leave the friary, our home. They were careful not to break any natural or religious law to accomplish their goals.

In the meantime there came the masters of the city and the councilmen with deceitful promises and temptations to soften the brother's minds and at the same time frighten them with threats so that they (might flee) to another place away from our friary. As soon as they got a foot inside, swiftly the whole mob would follow. In addition to that, the brothers also kept constant watch and closed (the gates) so that they under no condition would permit them that, but repeatedly referred to those who had given them the place.

But at no point did the brethren do what was ordered, when they (the mob) took (control of) the servants quarters, or when they on their own authority with violence took the orchard, and thereafter built a hospital for the poor as if it was a righteous act, in the orchard after they had destroyed another poor priory. They left open both sides of the orchard gate and people and animals streamed inside both day and night ignoring the brethren. No peace was given to the brothers or the right to celebrate services or to read from the canons or to renew their bodies.

Through all of these evil times the brethren remained unshakable, continued the reading of the holy scriptures at the set times and preached God's word. From the brothers' fast for Christmas to just before Lent they held every vesper. But at Carnival^{3} a few of the heretics assembled themselves near the gate to our friary to listen to the scriptures in their fashion and to prevent anyone from coming to hear the brethren and the scriptures. But the services each evening when ordinary people slept they held in the usual manner. And at the Feast of Easter, precisely second Easter day's evening when the brethren at Matins sang the 3rd Psalm, they (the heretics) threw seven fairly large stones through the north window and nearly all the brethren fled from the choir. After Ester they often invaded our friary and sought with threats and sometimes promises to belabor them so that they should follow their perverse will desire namely that either they join themselves to their heresy or turn the friary over to them for a theological school with the explanation that they themselves when the sacred hours and services ceased, they should pay for the school, in short, that they would be able to empower themselves so that the learned doctors in the 'true theology', or I mean God and the saint's mockers.

Next when the brethren neither would not go along with that, they sent some inside who should hinder them in reading the holy writ in our friary. Therefore, the brothers quieted their voices when reading the scriptures aloud. They in this way lessened the evil against them but they continued, though, with the readings at the usual times. Though they (the citizens) often sent people to keep an eye on them so that they would not in another way be able to read the holy lessons or preach in our friary.

But one day after noon they came in to the brethren who were gathered in the refectory and asked them if they would convert to Luther's teaching and hear instruction and preaching. They asked each brother one at a time. But all the brethren answered no and assured them that they would under no conditions convert to the other teaching that they had heard and that their teaching and readers of the holy scriptures taught them well enough about what they heard to understand the holy writ.

When Master Jørgen Møntmester praised his learned master's reading and preaching, Brother Gabriel, the Guardian, who took offense over the fox-crafty man's words that their preachers and reading masters lived in adultery. "What are you saying said Møntmester. "Is the honourable estate (marriage) adultery? The Guardian answered excusing himself that he had not called the honourable estate adultery, but the Møntmester faulted him for (saying) the opposite. But then the Vice-Guardian Jacob pointed a knife at them. "Father Guardian, have you said that their honourable marriages are a life in adultery? Then you have spoken correctly and it cannot be denied. We can easily prove it is as you have said." By these words were Frans, the apostates, and heretics struck and seized in such a degree of rage that he could not control his lips or his mouth. He answered in his rage that all our vows were not virtuous. Brother Jacob answered him among other things that an apostate's word about vows had no validity. So they drew themselves back with many words both outside and inside.

In the fourth week after Easter, (8–14 May 1529) many citizens one day, driven to rage by their violent hate, at the 8th hour (2 o'clock) came to the friary while the Guardian was holding services in the vestry. Vice-guardian Brother Jacob commanded the cellar master Brother Jacob Jensen to bar all the doors with strong timbers, but he was unable to do it. They came inside by the door from the servant's quarters and the Guardian went out to them, while the brethren remained in the dormitory, because he hoped he could soothe their wild minds with calm words. But when he came to them in the refectory, they scolded him and insulted him with such gross shouting that he went up to the dormitory to call the brethren together.

But when he would not permit the upper ranks to go down to them together with their Vice-Guardian he said that those who would, could remain in the cellar. To that the brothers answered, "If he himself would not leave the friary with them, we none of us will leave." All the brothers went down to them (the citizens) in the refectory where they had assembled with grim demeanor and cruel minds. When the brothers had gathered, the citizens expressed the desire that they (the brothers) immediately abandon the friary or convert to their faith.

When the brothers ignored both (suggestions) they remained with them until noon sometimes speaking with the brothers, and sometimes they threatened but a royal warrant or permission they could not show, and the brethren said no steadily to abandoning the friary. So they took the keys to the beer cellar and refectory from the cellar master and the cook and brought up much provision and drink. After dinner they sang a long psalm to mock the brethren. When that was completed and the brothers steadily refused to leave, all the city fathers except Jens Fynbo left. He alone remained together with the many do-nothings to drive out the brethren and began in many ways to force the keys of the friary from the Guardian. When he said no and evening had fallen they said that the brothers could not leave the refectory unless they did what was wanted. The brothers remained all night in the refectory and lay upon the floor.

There was an elderly brother, Laurids Jakobsen, who was brought near to death by the plagues. He obtained permission to go up to the dormitory on the condition that he would ponder until the next day his conversion to their faith. When they had locked the brothers inside the refectory, those who had been set to watch brought up beer from the cellar and drank themselves drunk the whole night, sang and danced in the dormitory and choir, rang the bell constantly and held a real Bacchus orgy and every hour through the night they opened the door to the refectory and went inside to see if the monks had fled out of the windows.

In the morning, they (the brothers) could hardly get permission to go to the toilet and when someone went out there, two or three or four followed them to keep an eye on them all the way out to the toilet door. When they came back, they locked the door until the city masters came. When they came sometime before noon, they introduced their teacher to the brothers in the refectory, so that they could convert, actually persecute them into the Lutheran faith. But when they ended two lessons about dinner time and could not convince the brethren of their heresy, they drove them by force out of the friary, every one of the brothers received his bedclothes and a washbasin that was retrieved from the cells. When they were about to leave through the cemetery, they took the Guardian Gabriel Poulsen and Brother Bernhard Poulsen, the other Vice-Guardian away from the brothers and led them to prison because they would not tell where the founding letters^{4} were, they (the Guardians) had sent them in advance to another place for safe-keeping.

The other monks went to Lund, but the two were released from prison on the condition that they attend their heretic lessons. It happened that the Guardian went along with that and now is led astray and after a year has removed his habit. The Almighty and All-Powerful God have compassion over him because of his boundless kindness. To God be the honour and a glory for this and the blessing rich works he has done toward us and toward all his creations from the beginning of creation until the hour when he will gather them again and for all things and for every single thing given us and gives them back again in eternity. Amen.

^{1} Carnival (Danish:fastelavn) was celebrated the week before Lent begins usually in February.

^{2} Feast of the Purification of the Virgin Mary was a set feast day in the old church calendar on 2 February. It commemorated when Mary went to the temple after Jesus' birth. Today it is often called the Feast of the Presentation.

^{3} The canonical day at the time was called the Divine Office which were prayers and worship services at set times during the day. Matins was the earliest service at dawn. Lauds came next. Services during the day were named after the hours. Vespers was the service in early evening. Compline was just before bedtime.

^{4} The founding letters were essentially the deed to the religious house. The letters were notices of gift from a wealthy land owner to a religious order. Possession of the founding letters seemed to be an important step in turning out the friars on several occasions.

== Chapter 5 Concerning the Friary in Copenhagen ==
The expulsion of the monks from (Copenhagen) Friary occurred the same year as the friars of Malmø were driven out (1529)^{1}. The description of that, the inhuman methods and proceedings which were used in the persecution and the mournful expulsion is recounted on the following pages. (The rest of the description is missing or blank.)

^{1} The date is established by the previous entry for the Expulsion from Malmø in mid-May 1529.

== Chapter 6 Concerning the Friary in Kolding ==
In 1529 from the Saviour of the world's incarnation, about the time of the Feast of the Nativity of the Virgin Mary^{1}, while our order suffered persecution under King Frederik, the son of the most Christian King Christian II's son, came the aforementioned king, the opponent of all Christian religion and corrupted by the Lutheran heresy to Kolding. At the urging of some few Lutheran citizens and the nobleman, Hartvig Andersen Ulfeld, who desired our friary, was there sent a few noblemen from the aforesaid king to those of our brethren who lived there, to tell them that they must abandon the friary and move to another place because the king would not permit them to remain, and he sent them some money, exactly 100 marks, as travel money.

When the brothers under no circumstance would accept the money, it was deposited at the friary hospital where it remained untouched until the next day. Now the king realized that they would not comply with his wishes or even receive his gifts, so he sent people there who should drive them out of the friary by force and by the king's command.

The aforementioned king offered the monks a chalice, equipment, and the attire required for celebrating the Mass. But out of love for Jesus Christ they spurned the offer. They departed and for their Christian faith's sake were robbed of the alms collections and everything else that was in the friary, and they knew not where they should go. Meanwhile, all the brethren who had been driven out were received in other locations, except a brother by the name of Martin, who laid aside his habit and remained inside the friary. Monks before the expulsion had suffered much evil because of the heretics in Kolding and their preacher, a lapsed Dominican friar, who had been expelled from Haderslev Priory.

^{1} The Feast of the Nativity of the Virgin Mary was celebrated on 8 September.

== Chapter 7 Concerning the Friary in Ålborg ==
In 1530 there was a shameless heretic by the name of Axel Gjø, the bailiff of Ålborg Castle and son of Herr Mogens Gjø, the author of all this evil, like father, like son, who plagued the brothers in the Ålborg Friary in many ways. First, he asked our Father Guardian, Brother Johannes Kristensen, if he could obtain warehouse space, so that he could deliver some grain to the friary's loft. But thereafter he began little by little to take more space and by force removed the brother's provisions.

Now when the brethren had brewed a great amount of beer and went to services in the church, he (Gjø) brought his servants and took all the new-brewed beer down into his (part of the) cellar. By doing this over and over again, he brought the brothers into such want that they scarcely had a corner in the friary where they could be left in peace. Every day he plagued them more and more. At last he even removed the clapper from the bell, so that they could not ring it or call the people together, and he processed around the churchyard with his servants who carried a flag. Soon thereafter persecuting and mocking the brethren in intolerable ways, he chased them out of the friary by force.

== Chapter 8 Concerning the Friary at Randers ==
In the year of the Lord 1530 after the brethren had countless quarrels and suffered much from the heretics side, Mogens Gjø^{1}, who at that time was the heretic's protector and himself the worst heretic, received three letters from King Frederik I concerning the Grayfriar's expulsion from the friary in Randers. So he (Gjø) sent his bailiff to Randers. He (the bailiff) came into our friary along with the master of the town and the town bailiff and showed the royal warrants, the result of which was that in compensation for the Friary at Flensborg, and as a reward for his long service, he (Gjø) had persuaded his majesty who gave him the Grayfriars Friary in Randers.

The Guardian, Jens Jostens, replied in the meantime that he absolutely would not forsake his friary because of the letter. They said to him, "Have you no greater respect for his majesty?" "I will show him all dutiful honour," he said. So they said to him, "So ask for a temporary postponement!" Which he did. They granted him immediately a postponement until the next Sunday, and then they drove the monks out.

There was a traitor, Brother Henning, who heard the Guardian say to the porter in the cloister that he should not open the gate when the town bailiff and the others came to force the brothers out. Henning went to the town bailiff, and told him the Guardian would not speak to him at the gate, but near the iron grill in the church. When the town bailiff came and knocked on the gate, the porter, Brother Clemens, let him go to the grillwork and went himself to fetch the Guardian.

In time Brother Clemens opened the grillwork for them. The citizens came into the friary met the Guardian and porter in the cloister and demanded the Guardian again to obey the king's letter. "We will not under any circumstances abandon the friary because of the letter." The bailiff grew angry and threatened him and declared him a rebel against his majesty. But when the bailiff and the others went to return through the grille, the porter already having opened the gate, then came the traitor, Brother Henning and said, "No, you should not go out that way. If you go out that way, it will be a year before you will get back into the friary." The bailiff followed his counsel, went back to the Guardian and said to him, "I will remain here with you today and set my kettle on the fire with your kettle." He remained with the others and chased thereafter all the brothers from the friary and permitted Mogens Gjø to take over the friary.

^{1} Mogens Axelsen Gjø was the master of the court (Danish:rigshofmesteren) under Frederik I. In this capacity he became the chief enforcer of Frederik's policy of limiting the power of religious houses, specifically Franciscans. He received the Randers Friary as a reward for his fervor. He is specifically mentioned in the Jutland expulsions as the prime mover. Apparently his father was a fervent Lutheran as mentioned in the expulsion at Aalborg.

== Chapter 9 Concerning the Friary in Trelleborg ==
(The Page is Missing.)

^{1} Trelleborg is extreme southern Skåne. While the chronicle page describing the expulsion of the friars in Trelleborg is missing, it is known from other documents that the friars left Trelleborg on their own without being forced out. While this may on the surface appear a happier circumstance than other locations, something must have occurred that sent the friars packing. Perhaps the 'quarrels' mentioned in Ålborg between monks and reform-minded Trelleborgers was enough to convince the Franciscans it was time to go before they were forcibly removed. The friary was completely dependent on the surrounding community for food and necessities. Trelleborg is a small town and if the majority of citizens refused to supply them, the brothers would have to leave or starve.

== Chapter 10 Concerning the Friary in Køge ==
In 1530 after many regrettable events, whereof the most frequent happened during Brother Laurens Hansen's time, who had been the vicar and minister, (the citizens) asked the monks, who were heavily burdened by the heretics and suffered from want of provisions, about postponing their expulsion. Preacher Hans Brun was present. The citizens (agreed to) help them on condition that when the agreed upon respite expired, they should leave their friary, unless they could obtain more sustenance, and turn the place over to the citizens. This they agreed to, in spite of the minister's demand that the should be no such a respite for them. So by introducing such trickery and deception of the Guardian and brothers, that they were compelled to abandon the friary.

== Chapter 11 Concerning the Friary in Halmstad ==
Herein is explained the method whereby the friary in Halmstad was invaded and the brothers expelled in the following words:

13 January 1531 the priest and heretic Hans Hemmingsdyng came from Falsterbo^{1} to Halmstad, he was a perverse Lutheran, and he was called to the town by the citizens the preach the word. If only it had been the word of God!

A few days after his arrival in Halmstad town he gathered a great crowd of citizens together with the town masters, he went after noon into the brother's church and while the assembled accomplices listened, he scolded the brothers for three things: that the brothers were spiritual thieves, soul murderers, and deceivers against the common people, and they continued that one could not prove the Grayfriars rule from the holy scriptures.

Brother Mads Madsen, who at the time was the Guardian answered him for all the brethren and a great crowd of the congregation's hearing:

"St Paul commanded in 2 Timothy 2:14, where he says 'Strive not about words to no profit, which only subverts the hearers.' Therefore, your charges according to every court pro is void, I mean that your are the prosecutor with a false accusation, you over reach yourself and it is not right that you be both witness and judge. Therefore I reject you as one who renders only spite and are not our judge, and I will appeal the case against you before the archbishop and the chapter in Lund, where I can cleanse myself and mine before learned men against this false charge which you have brought against us and witness as clear as the sun that our rule is apostolic and truly evangelical."

Later on Septuagesima Sunday^{2} in the first lesson that was held where Brother Søren Jacobsen, who was later mortally wounded in Ystad during the persecution of the brethren, said in his lesson toward the conclusion that the three vows (poverty, chastity, and obedience) and the commandments of the rule (of St Francis of Assisi), its (detailed) contents and essence were clearly taken from the gospel of Christ.

The aforementioned heretic, Hans Hemmingsdyng, was present to catch the preacher during his lesson as the scripture-wise and Pharisee were want to attack Jesus. When he heard that, he became angry and incited the citizens against the brothers, first inside the friary church once the lesson was completed and thereafter in the parish church where he swore that he (Brother Søren) will never preach to them (the brothers and congregation) again, if (he did) they would attack the brothers and prevent them from preaching and holding mass.

But when the brothers immediately held services, they (the citizens) promised after receiving advice from several clever citizens counsel that they would wait until after noon. After noon of the aforementioned Septuagesima Sunday the masters of the town, town councillors, and town bailiff and many other citizens of the Lutheran sect took first the chalice from the brothers, next they plundered the altars and removed the book of the mass and other books from the book cabinet into the sacristy. The town bailiff received the keys to the sacristy and locked everything in there.

It was also forbidden to the brothers after that time to ring the bells at the appointed times. All these things the citizens instituted by the authority they took to themselves without orders from a higher authority, (and that) after just hearing from the devilish priest Hans Hemmingsdybg. The brethren received, however, permission to remain in the friary until they had procured foot gear, but not all of them left the friary when the time elapsed. In order to bring to pass what the Lutherans desired, the nobleman Holger Gerson, the mayor and the counselors went into the friary and obtained from them a promise that six of the brothers might remain in the friary, though with the conditions that they might not hold mass, not preach God's word, not go out begging, or go out to the surrounding farm towns without the mayor's permission, or otherwise encourage anyone in the old praiseworthy rituals against the Lutheran sect, or even hear the scriptures.

But because one of the six mentioned brothers, specifically the above named Brother, Søren Jacobsen on the first Sunday in Lent listened to two person's confession, he was expelled along with the others. But the rest of the brothers in the friary were expelled or left on their own in the Lord's year 1531, the week of Laetare^{3}. In Roskilde there is to be found a letter of recommendation concerning the brothers behavior and the seal of the friary. There were goods which were sold or taken from the aforementioned Halstad Friary, but were promised to be returned over time etc. This concerns the following:

First Master Gerhard Olsen, mayor of the town of Halstad in 1530 shortly before Christmas took by force a gilded chalice which his father, Oluf Petersen gave the convent; it was never recorded in the royal register^{4} because his mother, who lived at the time, continually encouraged him to leave it for ecclesiastical use for which it was given.

Later the same Gerhard Olsen received a farm which lay next to the churchyard south of the friary that Brother Laurentius Byldtzman, when he was Guardian, allowed to be purchased for 160 marks. That farm Gerhard desired to have in exchange for a half farm which his sister a little earlier had willed to our friary in Halmstad.

Later the Halmstad town bailiff, Niels Skriver, got by force a copper or brass kettle from Jon Styng's house, which was placed in pawn to him by the Guardian for 15 marks despite that it was in common business worth at least 20 marks. It was not included in the register because of an oversight by the scribe.

And furthermore Hans Bagge, received a farm which lay next to the friary next to the water mill, which Nielse Erikssen who then lived in Halmstad, willed to the brothers the one half when he himself died, and the other half part after his wife's death, and they both died before the dissolution of the friary.

And furthermore Herr Holger Grerson Ulfstand, before the retirement of the Guardian Mads Madsen, received four silver weapon (sheaths) for which the friary received no compensation. And he also loaned 1 short saw, and another saw which was located in the four-sided archway.

And furthermore Herr Holger took under his protection, at Brother Mads Madsen's request, a chapel with attached house in Skanør, which the friary had built there.

And furthermore the same Herr Holger received of the friary 20 boards 36 feet long, 3 (tylvter) and two of wood, 28 feet, four boards 34 feet long, 5 boards of 32 feet, 10 boards of 40 feet. for all of this the brethren received four tuns of Rye, 6 tuns of barley, and five tuns of oats. Grain was particularly expensive in the land that year. Furthermore, the aforementioned Herr Holger gave 13 or 14 marks to the brethren who were chased out. Similarly. Hologer Gersen's wife got a faultless little clock which she promised to return if the friary was reestablished.

Brother Siger received the large comforter on behalf of Herr Holger's persistent petition which the town bailiff permitted him to obtain until he should return it when it was required. Brother Siger also got (Brother) Vilhelms' little sermon book.

Likewise Halmstad's Lutheran pastor by the name of Jasper, who at one time had been a brother of the order, but who had become the most perverse heretic, received the large concordance to the published Bible, which the town bailiff permitted him to take against the time when he should surrender it in time. The same Jasper received a coverlet with the permission of the town bailiff.

So much for the friary in Halmstad.

^{1} Falsterbo is a town on the tiny westernmost peninsula of Skåne lies opposite south Zealand.

^{2} Septuagesima Sunday is the third Sunday before Lent begins. It marks the beginning of the Pre-Lenten season of the old church calendar.

^{3} Laetare Sunday is the fourth Sunday in Lent, the half-way point until Easter. It usually falls in March.

^{4} The royal registry refers to a comprehensive inventory of religious houses commanded by King Frederik I. It included not only land and income properties but specific valuable items which had been donated over time to the various religious institutions in Denmark. The Franciscans viewed the registry as the 'thin edge of the wedge' that would eventually end in the dissolution of the monasteries.

== Chapter 12 Concerning the Friary in Ystad ==
This is the story of the inhuman and sorrowful ways the Grayfriar monks were persecuted or hounded out of Ystad Friary by the Lutheran sect in the Lord's year 1532, shortly before the Annunciation of the birth of Jesus^{1} to the blessed Virgin Mary. The following events will make it clear for the reader to see how unrighteously and unChristian they were dealt with.

First one must make it clear that already before the brother's expulsion the Lutheran citizens had used violence against them, despite that they (the brothers) had complained to the king and the State Council. The first violent episode took place when the Lutheran party driven and inflamed by a devilish and fire-spouting spirit came to the Ystad Friary, encircled it, and forced their way inside, and it would have succeeded if the brethren had not strengthened the gate and church door with heavy beams and pieces of wood and personally offered strong resistance.

But the Lutherans began to smash the planks of the church door and tore down the enclosure surrounding the friary and invaded the servants quarters. But because of the brothers' resistance, they could not get into the interior of the friary. Therefore, they filled the brothers' ears with scolding and mocking; they called them murderers, robbers, thieves, blood suckers, and soul destroyers.

The second violent episode against the brothers was by the same Lutherans who determined to enter the friary and write down all the friary contents without authority. At that time a certain Søren Jepsen and another citizen named Ingvard destroyed the door and lock to the dormitory. These things and many unkind words were used against the Ystad brethren before their expulsion.

Now follows a short account of the expulsion.

The year after the above-named events, that is 1532, before the Feast of the Annunciation to the Blessed Virgin Mary^{1} just as we were finished with vespers and the official service, the town mayor, Hans Hjort, came together with his Lutheran party and a great part of the citizens and pounded violently on the gate and demanded to be admitted. That was denied them, and they ran to the church grillwork^{2} with burning rage and shouting. They shook the grillwork so that it was nearly broken it into pieces by force.

When the Guardian, Brother Anders Bertelsen, heard it, he hurried together with some of the other brothers to the grille and asked them why they had come with such anger and such rage, and what they wanted. They all shouted that they had a royal letter (indicating) that all the brothers should be expelled and the friary remodeled into a hospital for the poor and the sick. They asked if they might come in, but when the Guardian would not permit them, they said they would force their way into the friary. When the Guardian heard that, he demanded to see the royal warrant that ordered such an expulsion, and if they could not show it, then they (the monks) would under no circumstances leave the friary. The citizens replied that they would under no circumstances show him the letter.

After this exchange of words, Hans Hjort together with all the others went back to the gate and asked if he and a few other people could enter the friary and speak peacefully with him and the brothers without violence or wrong. And he promised on his faith under oath, yes under the loss of his position, that he would keep his word. And then under those assurances of his trustworthiness the guardian opened the gate.

But when the door was opened, Hans Hjort with all his followers ran raging into the friary and tore the keys violently from the porter. When they had done that, Soren Jepsen demanded of the Guardian the founding charters of the friary, its keys, and the accounts concerning the properties which had been recorded in the royal register. register Guardian demanded two or three times that someone should read aloud the royal warrant. At last the town scribe, Søren was his name, took out a wad of paper without a seal and read aloud to the Guardian and his brothers the articles and reasons for which they should be expelled:

First, the brethren did not preach the holy Gospel. For the second, all the citizens desired that the brethren be expelled. For the third, the brethren had no way to sustain themselves. When this was read out and heard, the Guardian asked Master Niels Vinther and the town council if the brethren had preached anything other than Christ's holy Gospel and the holy scriptures.

Whereupon they replied that the brethren had preached correctly and Catholic for them and had lived uprightly among them and said: We do not at all wish that the brethren should be chased away." The Lutherans contradicted them, and there arose a great internal division among the citizens. When quiet was restored, the Guardian appealed to the king and State Council; he would reply to these false charges. And he said that those here (referring to the warrant) have spoken to the king in error.

Thereafter Søren Jespen ran forward in great haste toward the Guardian and tore the keys violently from him. When the brethren saw that, they ran away, all of them; some up into the choir, others into the dormitory, but the Lutheran citizens hunted them forcefully out of the cells, dragged them out and struck them with their axes.

But one brother, called Søren Jacobsen, they threw to the floor near the stair to the dormitory several times, stomped on him with their feet and in the cloister smashed him against the walls and dragged him around the cloister by his arms like a dumb ass. When he finally escaped from them, he said to his brethren: "I tell you, brothers, and it is true, that I feel my death is near after such blows and bumps as I have taken; I am so poorly that I can hardly draw a breath." Several days afterwards this brother went to bed and began to be very ill, such that he spit up blood continually and often fell unconscious to the floor. When Brother Søren lay in his final hours a few (citizens) came to him, councilor Algod Nielsen, Mogens Johansen, Tycho Laurentsen, Tue Sutor, and Peter Olsen came to (see) the aforementioned Brother Søren.

He said to them: You dear men and friends! See how un-Christian your fellow citizens have mishandled me! Especially Peter Nielsen, Oluf Maler, Lars Bønder, and many others I do not know, who have struck me, so that I cannot but suffer death." At last the town bailiff, Peter Madsen, came to the aforesaid Brother Søren together with a few other citizens and asked him if he would accuse anyone of causing his death, in case he should suffer death. But Brother Søren replied: "You should know that if I had remained in my friary, then I wouldn't be so weak and sick as I am now. But though I harbour no hatred or resentment against those who mishandled me so inhumanly, I would like to forgive them for the love of Jesus Christ's sake, he who has suffered even more for my sake. I have enough to think about with the pains in my body until I can overcome even that. But their judgement, who have mishandled and beat me so cruelly, I leave to the righteous judge who shall judge all things righteously. I will not craft my words, so that I run into difficulties if I survive, though I don't believe that I shall survive."

Also (there came) two of the aforesaid persons or men to Brother Søren, who had struck him. They acknowledged their guilt and asked for his forgiveness which they also obtained. But others of those who had struck him continued in their stiff-necked wickedness and did not come to ask for forgiveness.

(Returning now to the account of the expulsion) Also many citizens struck nearly all the other friars to the ground, they were mistreated as if attacked by wolves, they were struck with swords, and like miserable asses dragged by the arms out of the friary. Yes, so cruel and inhuman were they mistreated that I believe fully and completely that if a Jew or a heathen had seen such actions and so miserable a sight that they could not withhold their tears.

The king's mercenaries and knights who witnessed it were extremely saddened and felt the greatest sympathy and said: "O, how cruel and inhuman are the citizens of this town!" and "How hard a people there are in this Danish land! In our homelands when the virtuous ones were driven out, no one struck them so, or mistreated them in such a manner; just the opposite, people assisted them with clothing and money and other things necessary to the sustenance of life." Such things and many others said the leaders of the mercenaries to the brethren to comfort them. Also Master Niels Vinther and many other good people had much compassion with the brethren and wept. A few days after the expulsion two other brother priests, Thomas and Kristoffer died because of their wounds and blows which they received from the cursed Lutherans, but that must be left to the righteous judge, he who knows the depth of all things.

At the holy time of Easter when all true Christians who have reached the age of understanding were used to partaking of the most important communion, the brethren were unable to receive the sacred and honourable sacrament when they celebrated services behind closed doors, the Lutherans had forbidden it (communion) as if the brethren had been heathens, excommunicated, or cursed.^{3} They also held the Guardian, Brother Anders Bertelsen imprisoned for eight weeks and threatened him with the bread of persecution and the drink of tribulation. Of real bread whereby they could maintain life in him, he received none, not so much as a crumb and that doesn't happen even for law breakers who shall be hanged or racked.

Therefore, he was forced to beg from good Christian people for life's sustenance and (received) that only if he gave assurances that he would not run away. And despite the fact that the good Father Guardian and the brethren left good provision in the friary at the time they were driven out, they could obtain no provisions from there. That and much else must the Ystad brethren at the time of the expulsion endured from the unholy Lutherans side; and this has Father Anders Bertelsen himself told me, Brother Erasmus Olavi in good faith and forthrightly; he protested and proved it with word and script and called upon the Almighty God to witness that the preceding explanation is true as spoken.

^{1}: The Feast of the Annunciation was most often celebrated on 25 March, essentially New Year's Day in the old calendar.

^{2} Grillwork or the 'grille' is a loose translation of the Danish word 'gitter' which denotes a wrought iron fence or gates. This refers to the practice of gating off the monk's part of the church from the rest of the congregation which normally came to hear mass in the friary church. Aarhus Cathedral still has the grille in place as a work of medieval art. Many churches in Denmark 'gate off' chapels, funeral monuments, and other spaces to prevent unwanted intrusion with similar wrought iron gates or fences.

^{3} One might ask the question, given the violent treatment the Franciscans had received at the hands of the citizens of Ystad, why were they still there weeks later? It may well be that they were awaiting some word about Father Bertelsen's appeal 'to the king and State council', but Frederik I had less than a year to live, the State Council was in the process of gathering support to prevent Duke Christian from taking the throne and tipping the balance of power in favor of the Lutherans. Certainly the brethren remained at Ystad for some time after the expulsion. The expulsion happened before the Feast of the Annunciation and at Easter they were celebrating mass behind 'closed doors' perhaps a reference to the friary. Brother Søren Jacobsen's reference, "If I had remained in the friary..." indicates that he was perhaps taken in by more compassionate citizens of Ystad. Guardian Anders Bertelsen remained imprisoned eight weeks before he was released and went to tell his story to Brother Erasmus Olai.

== Chapter 13 Concerning the Friary in Næstved ==
The history about the way whereupon it happened that the brethren from Næstved Friary were expelled. It happened in the Lord's year 1532 the day after the glorious Virgin Mary's Assumption^{1} and took place at that time and in this manner: The ungodly heretic Herr Mogens Gjø, who was both the devils slave and soldier had certainly often threatened that he would chase the brethren from that place, despite (the fact) that his grandfather and wife were buried there and his great-grandfather and his wife had donated a chalice for the correcting of their souls which he (Gjø) took from the expelled brothers.

First this Mogens Gjø sought to introduce a few Lutheran preachers to the town and he got them to shout out against the brethren. When that didn't work, he sent some of those who had left the order namely, Johannes from Køge and Niels Christensen, two good-for-nothings who respected the preaching of Brother Rasmus Olsen, he who was lector and a defender of the faith. When they had done that, they made notes on a few points from his lesson which they incorrectly found less than true and reported their findings to Mogens Gjø. Mogens Gjø used this as an opportunity to send word and forbid Brother Rasmus and others permission to preach until they met with that strict knight to answer the points (that had been noted). But when the aforesaid Brother Rasmus took the worthy Father's Vice-Guardian, Brother Jacob Jensen and went with him to the State Council in Copenhagen to answer himself the points he had preached.

When they arrived in the council, they read out all the charges in Danish; and quickly both lay and clerics in the council were completely and wholly acknowledged as exemplary Christians. Many wept and feared that God's punishment would fall upon them when they put such things in doubt.

Tyge Krabbe took those articles which were approved by the council and the king. When the king saw them, he turned the case over to Mogens Gjø for closer examination. He called immediately two or three Lutherans and got them to research the abovementioned articles more closely. When they (Brothers Rasmus and Jacob) were examined and condemned by their (Lutheran's) blind judgement, Mogens wrote secretly to Næstved that the articles under investigation were heretical according to the State Council. He wrote a completely meaningless set of proofs which I believe the councillors have still. When all of this happened, the two brothers returned to Næstved. Again later the friary's Vice-Guardian spoke to Brother Jacob and the worthy Vice-Guardian in the presence of Brother Johannes Nyborg and sent them hurrying to Roskilde to the Father Guardian (saying) that he should hurry personally to Næstved. But there ( in Roskilde) on account of a royal warrant the brothers were expelled in the presence of the minister and all the accumulated alms were stolen^{2}.

^{1} The Feast of the Assumption of the Virgin Mary was celebrated on 15 August and commemorates the taking into Heaven of Mary, the mother of Jesus.

^{2} Though no specific account of the expulsion of the Greyfriars from Roskile can be dated to the approximate time as evidenced by the eyewitness account of Guardian of Næstved Friary in the fall of 1532.

== Chapter 14 Concerning the Friary at Kalundborg ==
It so happened that the brethren were expelled from Kalundborg Friary in 1532 at the Feast of Raising of the Cross^{1}. When Mogens Gjø, that ungodly and heretic man, many times threatened the brethren in Kalundborg that he would drive them out of the friary in another way since the citizens of Kalndborg would not do it. He ordered the bailiff of the castle before he left for Jutland to get all the brothers out of the friary, which he did. It happened such that Brother Mechior who was the Guardian of the friary was his fellow in the heresy and he offered but little opposition. It was agreed between him and Mogens Gjø that he would remain and become the heretic preacher in the town of Kalundborg which we have also determined he became.

^{1} The Feast of the Raising of the Cross occurs on 14 September in the liturgical year. It commemorates the finding of the True Cross by St Helena, the mother of Emperor Constantine, in 325 at Jerusalem. The Church of the Holy Sepulchre was built on the location.

== Chapter 15 Concerning the Friary at Horsens ==
This is the way in which the brethren were expelled from Horsens Friary.

After the cursed Lutherans had introduced and carried out countless persecutions and threats against the brothers before they were driven from their friary and after the forementioned Mogens Gjø, the persecutor of all the peaceful (ones), had encouraged many Lutheran citizens of Horsens to drive the brethren out of their friary. They attempted many times to tempt them if they could not be persuaded to leave their friary. They took hold of every single brother and promised them a handsome sum (of money) and a passable reward, but they still received a negative answer. They could not get the brothers to go out because of agreements because Manderup Holck had the founder's right over the friary and was very friendly-minded toward the brethren. So they held council with the ungodly gentleman, the above named Mogens Gjø and he convinced these citizens to refer themselves to the king and carry before him for him (the King) the monstrances and chalices from the church in Horsens to get him to sell them our friary which also happened. Therefore, the two Horsens citizens namely master of the town, Lars Jensen and another went away to the king's majesty who was staying at Gottorp (in southern Jutland) and obtained from him a letter concerning the brothers' friary. This letter from his royal highness was read out for the brothers in the friary in their daily assembly the day before Saint Barbara's martyrdom (4 December). Thereafter the aforementioned brothers found out how many and how false things were spoken while (they were) with his royal highness.

So on godly (St) Thomas the Martyr's Day^{1} the Bishop of Kent was all compassion withdrawn from all the brothers from the friary at Horsens for and that self-same day they were expelled from their friary, inhumanly and confused, without any justice or concern on the year and date mentioned above.

Now ( these are) the methods and why the persecution (and expulsion) of the Friars Minor from Denmark.

^{1} St Thomas Martyr's Day is 29 December, the anniversary of the murder of Thomas a' Becket in Canterbury Cathedral in 1170.

== Chronology ==
1527

Viborg Friary sometime after 1 Nov 1527

1528

Flensborg Friary sometime between late May and early June 1528

1529

Malmø Friary mid-May 1529

Copenhagen Friary sometime after mid-May 1529

Kolding Friary about 8 September 1529

1530

Tønder Friary about 15 September 1530

Aalborg Friary unspecified date

Randers Friary unspecified date

Køge Friary unspecified date

Trelleborg Friary unspecified date

1531

Halmstad early March 1531 (week of Laetare Sunday)

1532

Ystad Friary just prior to 25 March 1532

Næstved Friary 16 August 1532

Kalundborg Friary on or just after 14 September 1532

Roskilde Friary closed unspecified date in autumn

Horsens Friary 29 December 1532

1533

1534

Odense sometime after the election of the new Guardian (Denmark's last Franciscan Guardian) that year. (not included in the Chronicle)-->
