= Brömsebäck =

Coordinates: 56°19′N 16°03′E

Location
- Country: Sweden

Physical characteristics
- Length: 23 km (14 mi)

Brömsebäck is a small stream in southern Sweden on the border between the provinces Småland and Blekinge. Before 1658, the river formed the border between Sweden and Denmark. The Treaty of Brömsebro (1645) was entered on an islet in the river.
