= Torsås Municipality =

Torsås Municipality Torsås kommun
- Municipality
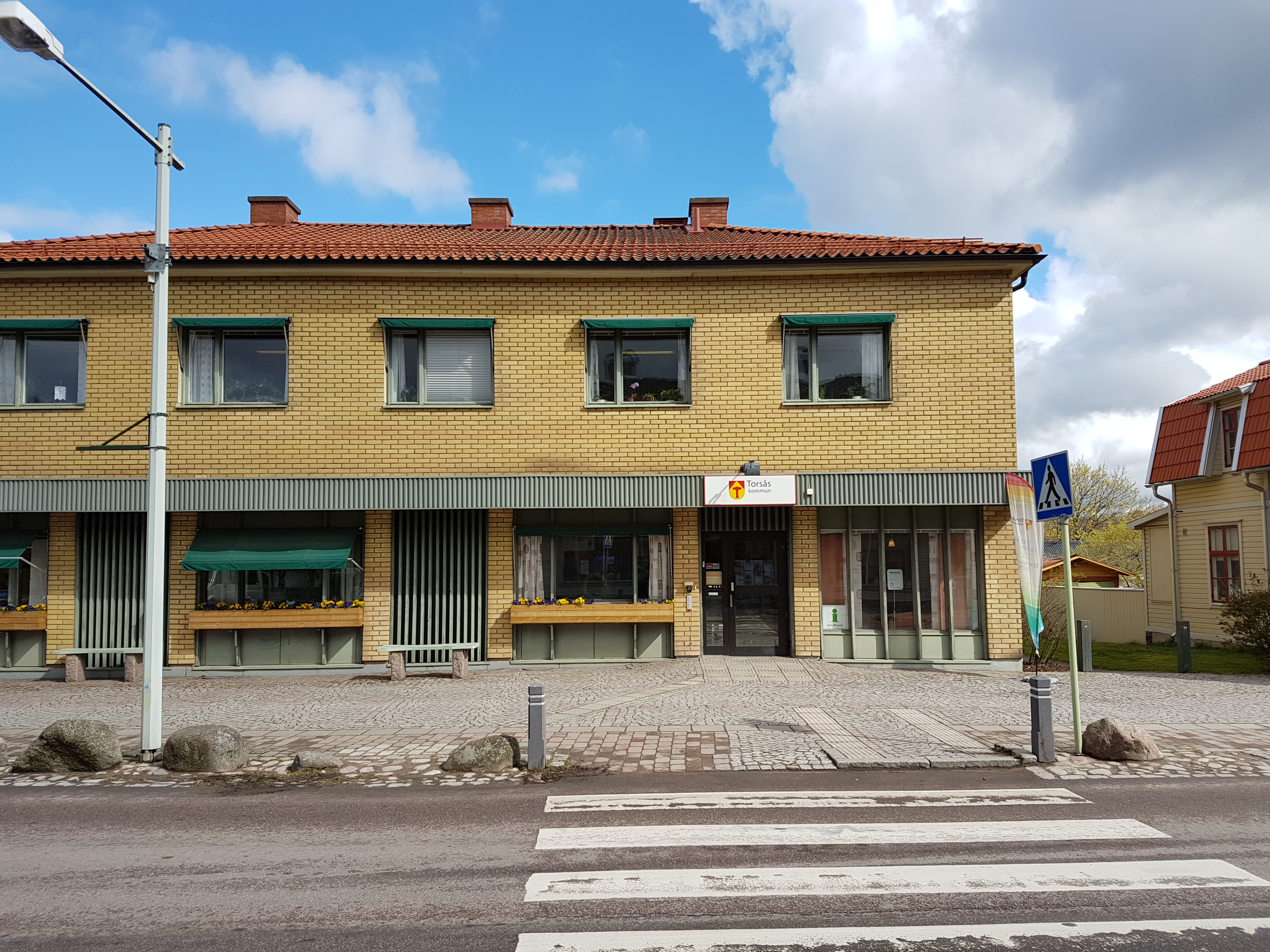
- Town hall

- Coat of arms

- Coordinates: 56°24′N 16°00′E
- Country: Sweden
- County: Kalmar County
- Seat: Torsås

Area
  - Total: 605.23 km^{2} (233.68 sq mi)
  - Land: 468.41 km^{2} (180.85 sq mi)
  - Water: 136.82 km^{2} (52.83 sq mi)
- Area as of 1 January 2014.

Population (30 June 2025)
  - Total: 6,921
  - Density: 14.78/km^{2} (38.27/sq mi)
- Time zone: UTC+1 (CET)
  - Summer (DST): UTC+2 (CEST)
- ISO 3166 code: SE
- Province: Småland
- Municipal code: 0834
- Website: www.torsas.se

Torsås Municipality (Swedish: Torsås kommun) is the southernmost municipality of Kalmar County, Sweden. Its seat is located in the town Torsås.

The present municipality was created in 1971, when "old" Torsås was merged with Söderåkra.

== Geography ==
The geography consists mainly of forest, not uncommon in Småland province. Located by the Baltic Sea, it has been somewhat cultivated too and there are some plains.

Being sparsely populated, Torsås Municipality tries to attract people to settle there, boasting its nature and the advantages of a small municipality while being no more than 30 minutes away from the larger towns of Kalmar and Karlskrona.

=== Localities ===
There are 3 urban areas (tätorter), localities, in Torsås Municipality.

In the table the localities are listed according to the size of the population as of December 31, 2005. The municipal seat is in bold characters.

#	Locality	Population
1	**Torsås**	1,829
2	Bergkvara	974
3	Söderåkra	963

A part of the locality Brömsebro is also in the municipality.

== Demographics ==
This is a demographic table based on Torsås Municipality's electoral districts in the 2022 Swedish general election sourced from SVT's election platform, in turn taken from SCB official statistics.

In total there were 7,107 residents, including 5,526 Swedish citizens of voting age. 40.1 % voted for the left coalition and 58.6 % for the right coalition. Indicators are in percentage points except population totals and income.

Location	Residents	Citizen adults	Left vote	Right vote	Employed	Swedish parents	Foreign heritage	Income SEK	Degree
Location			%	%					
Gullabo	632	471	44.4	54.6	77	84	16	22,181	33
Söderåkra 1	1,450	1,122	37.1	61.7	79	85	15	22,998	32
Söderåkra 2	1,705	1,320	42.8	56.2	77	88	12	23,299	36
Torsås 1	1,519	1,196	36.5	62.3	84	91	9	24,568	28
Torsås 2	1,801	1,417	41.7	56.8	76	84	16	21,888	25
Source: SVT

== Attractions ==
Points of interest in Torsås include a monument honouring the Treaty of Brömsebro between Denmark and Sweden in 1645, and the Garpen lighthouse, located on a small islet off the coast, where one can spend the night at a hostel. Those interested in curiosities might also find it worthwhile to have a look at the world's largest wooden ladle, measuring 4.64 metres (15.2 ft) tall and 1.07 metres (3 ft 6 in) wide, and weighing 350 kilograms (770 lb), located in Gullabo.

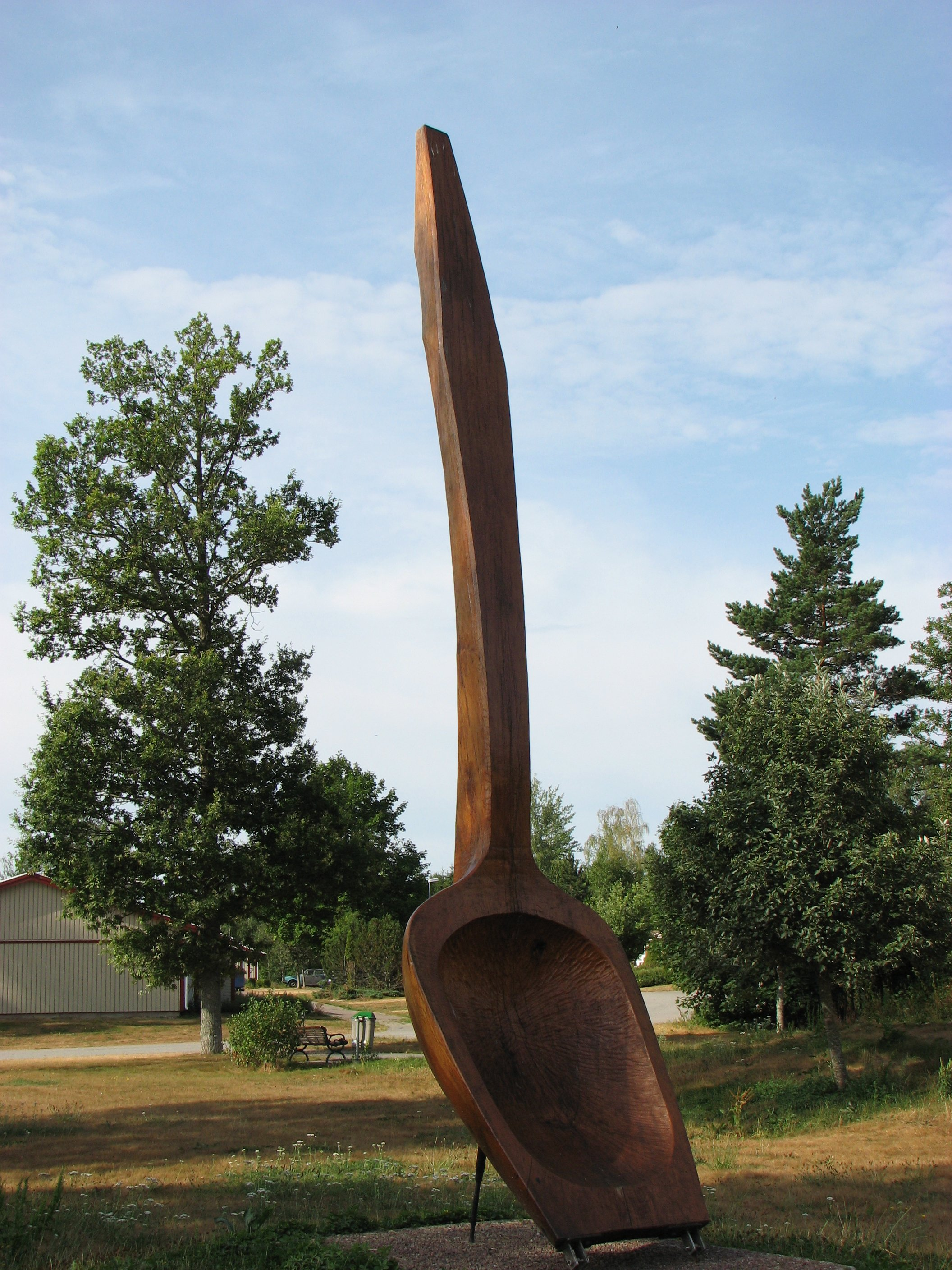
The world's largest wooden ladle, located in Gullabo
