= Bergkvara =

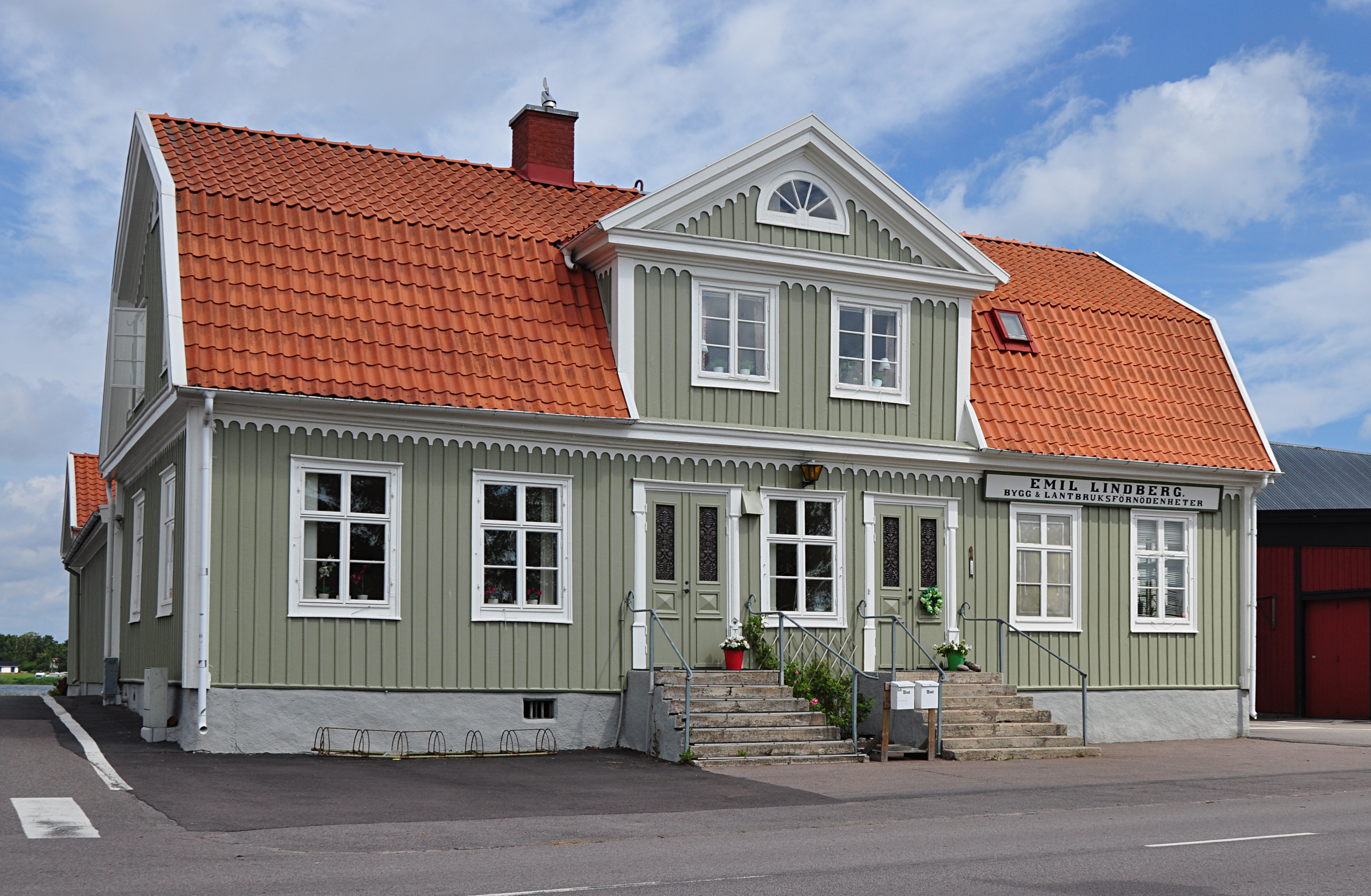

- Location within Kalmar Location within Sweden Location within European Union
- Coordinates: 56°23′N 16°05′E
- Country: Sweden
- Province: Småland
- County: Kalmar County
- Municipality: Torsås Municipality

Area
  - Total: 1.52 km^{2} (0.59 sq mi)

Population (31 December 2023)
  - Total: 1,129
  - Density: 743/km^{2} (1,920/sq mi)
- Time zone: UTC+1 (CET)
  - Summer (DST): UTC+2 (CEST)

Bergkvara is a locality situated in Torsås Municipality, Kalmar County, Sweden, with 1,129 inhabitants in 2023.
