= Torsås =

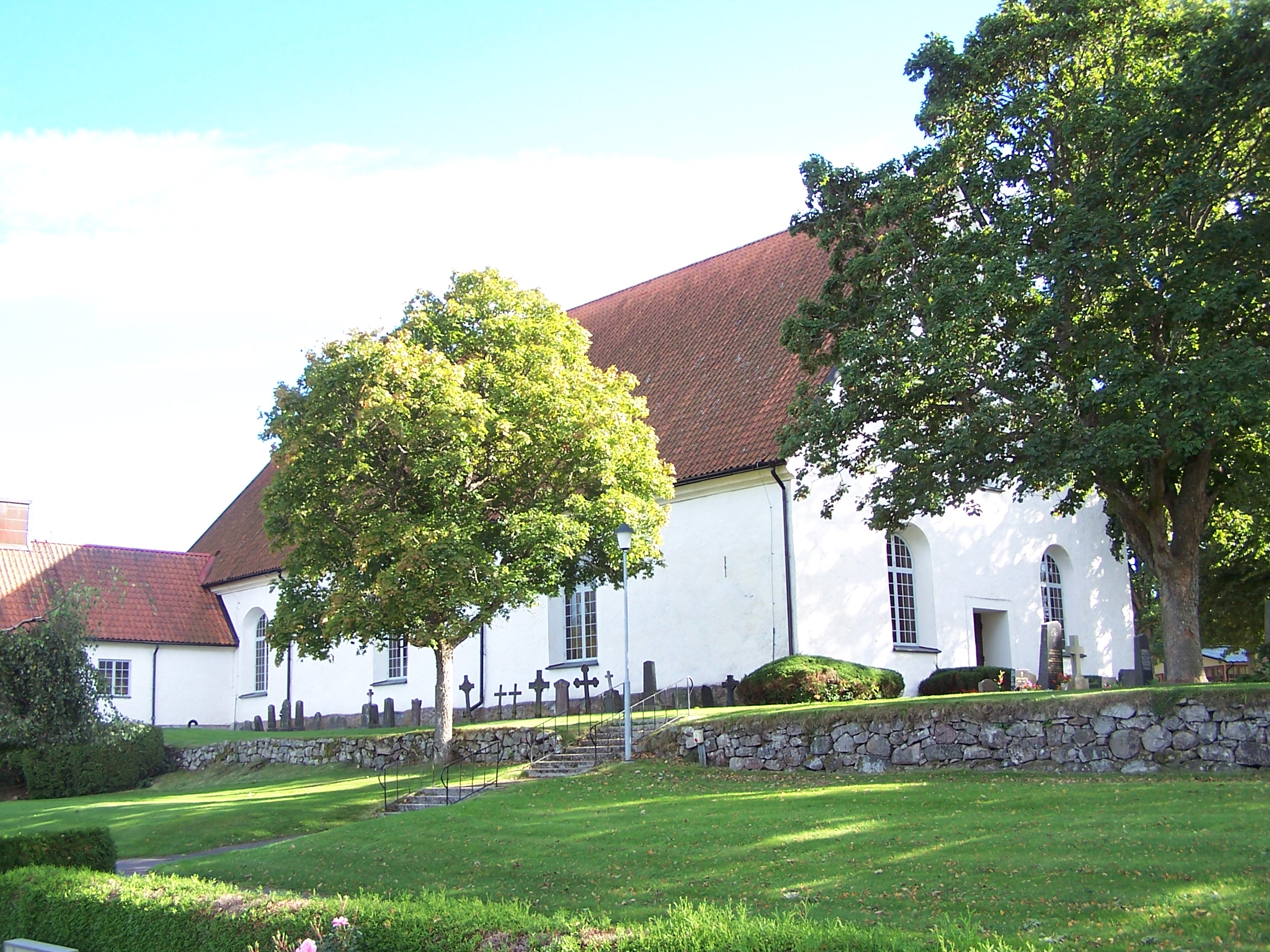
- Torsås Church

- Location within Kalmar Location within Sweden Location within European Union
- Coordinates: 56°24′N 16°00′E
- Country: Sweden
- Province: Småland
- County: Kalmar County
- Municipality: Torsås Municipality

Area
  - Total: 2.48 km^{2} (0.96 sq mi)

Population (31 December 2010)
  - Total: 1,848
  - Density: 746/km^{2} (1,930/sq mi)
- Time zone: UTC+1 (CET)
  - Summer (DST): UTC+2 (CEST)

Torsås (Swedish pronunciation: [ˈtûːʂoːs]) is a locality and the seat of Torsås Municipality, Kalmar County, Sweden with 1,848 inhabitants in 2010.
