= Brömsebro =

- Location within Sweden
- Coordinates: 56°18′N 16°00′E
- Country: Sweden
- Province: Blekinge and Småland
- County: Blekinge County and Kalmar County
- Municipality: Karlskrona Municipality and Torsås Municipality

Area
  - Total: 0.66 km^{2} (0.25 sq mi)

Population (2005-12-31)
  - Total: 213
  - Density: 322/km^{2} (830/sq mi)
- Time zone: UTC+1 (CET)
  - Summer (DST): UTC+2 (CEST)

Brömsebro (Swedish pronunciation: [brœmsɛˈbruː]) is a bimunicipal village situated in Karlskrona Municipality, Blekinge County and Torsås Municipality, Kalmar County in south-eastern part of country Sweden with 213 inhabitants in 2005.

Two Dano-Swedish treaties were signed in Brömsebro: the First Treaty of Brömsebro (1541), which was a Dano-Swedish alliance against the Hanseatic League, and the Second Treaty of Brömsebro (1645) ending the Torstenson War. The village was at that time situated on the border between Sweden and Denmark. It was also the venue of other diplomatic meetings and negotiations between Denmark and Sweden (see painting).

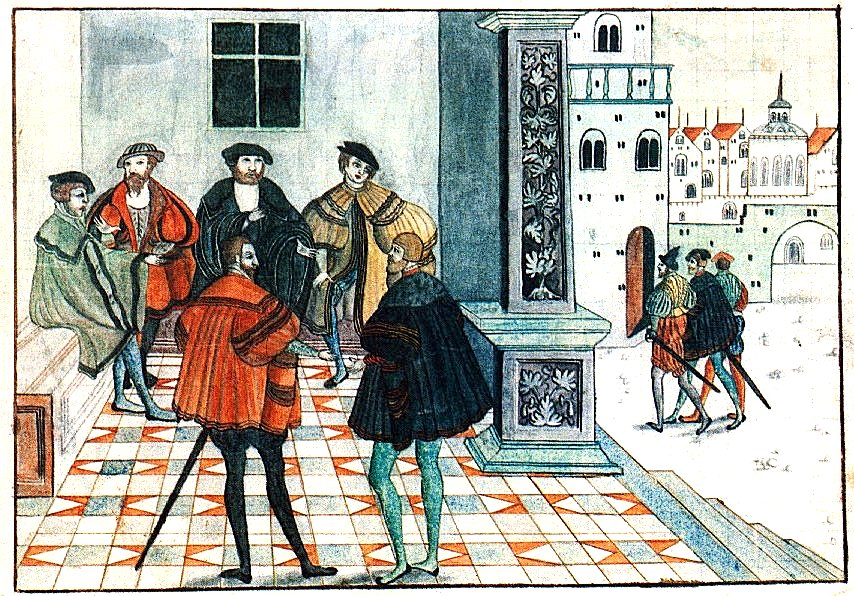
1541 meeting between Christian III of Denmark and Gustav I of Sweden at Brömsebro (watercolor reproduction of a lost painting made during the Swedish King's reign.)
