= Kalundborg Friary =

Kalundborg Friary was a Franciscan friary located in Kalundborg, Denmark.

== History ==
Kalundborg Friary was founded in 1239 by Ingerd Jacobsdatter (ca.1220-1258), wife of Count Konrad of Revenstein from Halberstadt, Germany, She was a wealthy relative of Esbern Snare (who had founded Kalundborg in 1170) and connected to the powerful Hvide family, and also one of Denmark's greatest landowners. Ingerd was particularly impressed by the teachings of Saint Francis of Assisi which she encountered in Germany and donated land in Kalundborg for the construction of the friary as well as nearby farm properties to fund its works and operation. At the same time she founded other Franciscan houses at Copenhagen, Roskilde and Næstved.

Kalundborg was at the time an important stop on the trade route between the North Sea and the Baltic. The Franciscans benefited from the location of the friary close to the city gate. The first church was consecrated in 1279 and consisted of a single short nave with a choir and an apse. It was built out of brick in the Gothic style.

In 1360 Kalundborg was fortified with a ring wall and towers. The friary was deemed to be a threat to the security of the walls and it was moved a little to the south-west.

The friary was constructed in a skewed rectangle with the church as the south wing. There was a cloister and garden. The exact location of the graveyard is unclear, but from time to time burials have been uncovered by later excavations. The other wings housed the friars and the lay brothers who worked the farms, a rectory and a hospital.

For many years Kalundborg Friary took a liberal view of the vows of chastity and poverty, and ran itself at a profit until 1518, when the chapter voted to return to a stricter interpretation of the rules of Franciscan brotherhood. The properties which had been used to create wealth were sold to the last Roman Catholic king of Denmark, Christian II.

== Dissolution ==
Under Frederik I, successor to Christian after his forced abdication in 1523, Denmark was embroiled in the debate over Luther's reforms of the Roman Catholic church and moved rapidly towards religious reformation. Many Danes were tired of the enforced tithes and the donations sought by monasteries, hospitals, and other religious foundations. Although Frederik officially adopted even-handed treatment of Catholics and Lutherans, he actively promoted Lutheran ideas. He granted local officials permission to forcibly close Franciscan houses all over Denmark, or looked the other way when officials overstepped their authority and closed religious houses without permission. Prince Christian, later Christian III, also encouraged the closure of Franciscan houses on his lands.

In 1532 the governor of Kalundborg Castle forced the Franciscans from the friary at the instigation of Mogens Gjø, an ardent Lutheran who worked tirelessly to force the closure of monasteries on Jutland and Zealand. The last guardian of the friary, Melchior Jensen, offered only token resistance and then became the first Lutheran pastor of Kalundborg.

Denmark became officially Lutheran in October 1536 when all remaining religious houses in the country were closed. The buildings and properties associated with Kalundborg Friary became crown property and were administered by the governor of Kalundborg Castle. The buildings were converted into housing for workers on the royal farms and for storage (Kalundborg Slots Ladegård).

By 1751 most of the friary had already been demolished and a new large farm headquarters building was constructed on the site. Subsequently, the remaining buildings were also pulled down, and there are no visible remains of the 300-year history of the Franciscans in Kalundborg.

== Sources ==
- Ganshorn, Jørgen, nd: Kalundborgs Historie (in Danish)
