= Treaty of Brömsebro (1541) =

1541 treaty between Denmark-Norway and Sweden

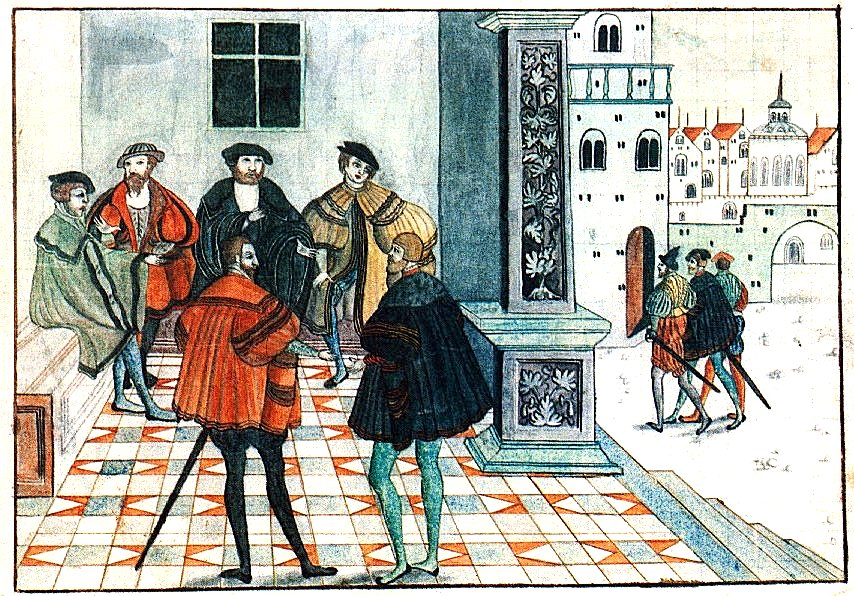
The First Treaty of Brömsebro, Christian III's meeting with Gustav I in Brömsebro, 1541. (Watercolor reproduction of a lost painting made during the Swedish king's reign.)

The Treaty of Brömsebro was agreed upon in September 1541. It was an agreement between the enemies Denmark–Norway and Sweden. The respective kings of both countries, Christian III and Gustav I, took part of the negotiations, which took place in Brömsebro, a village on the border.

The treaty would run for 50 years and had Denmark-Norway and Sweden agree upon a joint attitude against the Hanseatic League. Both countries also committed to providing support when each other was attacked by domestic or foreign enemies. That meant that Danish troops, for example, helped Swedish Gustav suppress a peasant uprising, the Dacke War, in the following years.

== See also ==
- Second Treaty of Brömsebro (1645)
- List of treaties
