= Treaty of Brömsebro (1645) =

Peace treaty between Sweden and Denmark–Norway

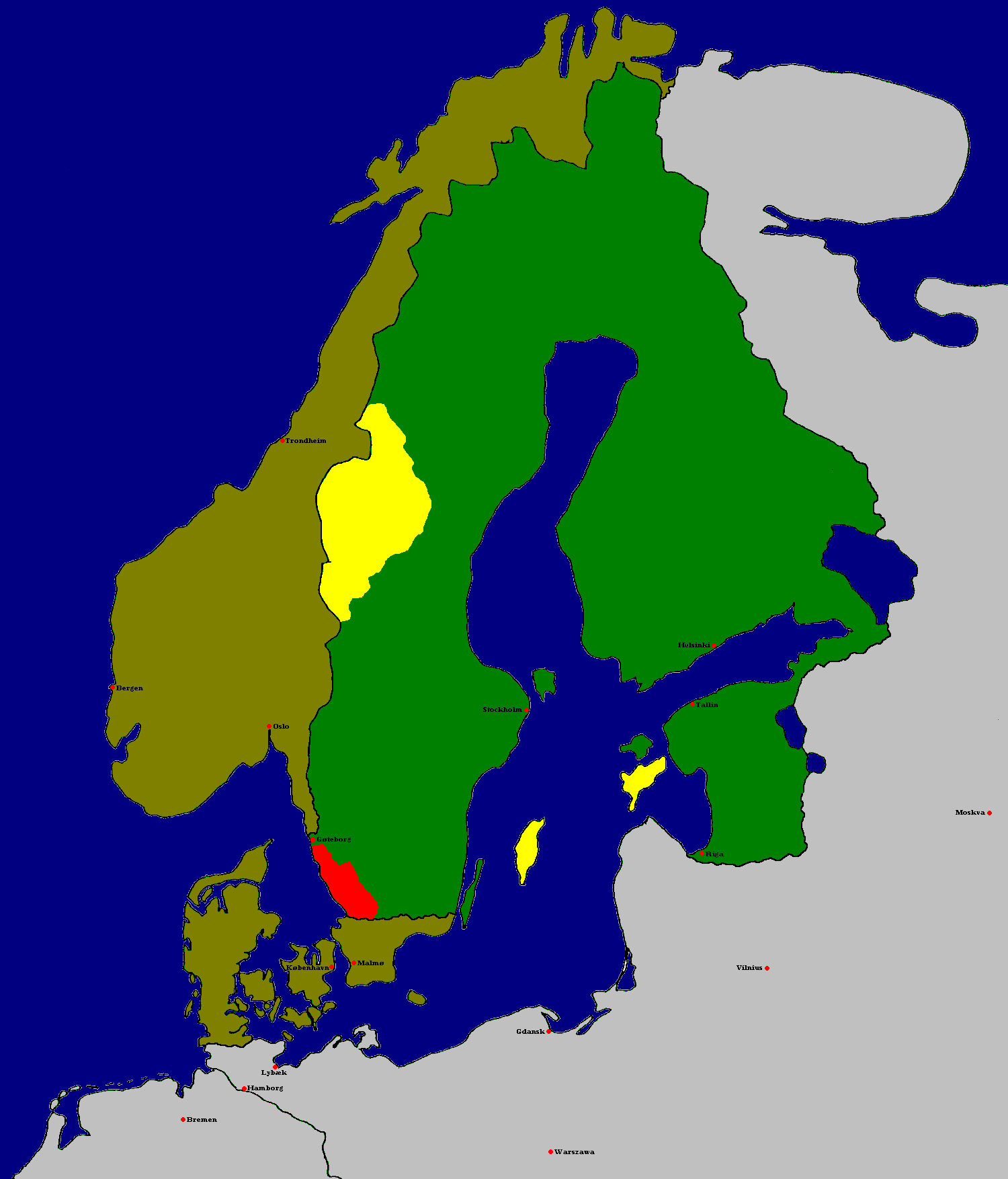
- The Treaty of Brömsebro in 1645. Brown: Denmark–Norway; Green: Sweden; Yellow: the provinces of Jämtland, Härjedalen, Idre and Särna and the Baltic Sea islands of Gotland and Ösel, which were ceded to Sweden; Red: the province of Halland, ceded for 30 years
- Type: Bilateral treaty
- Signed: 13 August 1645
- Location: Brömsebro, Denmark
- Original signatories: Denmark–Norway; Sweden
- Ratifiers: Denmark–Norway; Sweden

The Treaty of Brömsebro (or the Peace of Brömsebro) was signed on 13 August 1645, and ended the Torstenson War, a local conflict that began in 1643 (and was part of the larger Thirty Years' War) between Sweden and Denmark–Norway. Negotiations for the treaty began in February the same year.

== Location ==
The eastern border between the then Danish province of Blekinge and the Swedish province of Småland was formed by the creek Brömsebäck. In this creek lies an islet that was connected to the Danish and Swedish riversides by bridges. On the islet was a stone that was supposed to mark the exact border between the two countries. By this stone, the delegates met to exchange greetings and, at the end of the negotiations, the signed documents. The Danish delegation stayed in Kristianopel while the Swedish side had their accommodation in Söderåkra.

== Delegations ==
Sweden's highest ranking representative was Lord High Chancellor Axel Oxenstierna. He was accompanied by, among others, Johan Skytte, who died during the negotiations and was replaced by Ture Sparre.

Corfitz Ulfeldt and Chancellor Christen Thomesen Sehested were the chief negotiators of the Danish delegation.

The French diplomat Gaspard Coignet de la Thuillerie was head mediator and observers from the Hanseatic League, Portugal, Stralsund and Mecklenburg followed the negotiations.

== Results ==
The military strength of Sweden ultimately forced Denmark–Norway to give in to Swedish demands.

- Denmark–Norway ceded the Norwegian provinces of Jämtland and Härjedalen as well as the Danish Baltic Sea islands of Gotland and Saaremaa (Ösel). The Norwegian regions Idre & Särna were conquered by Dalecarlian peasants at the suggestion of the Swedish government. The concession of this region was not formally recognised until 1751.
- The Imperial Prince-Bishopric of Verden and Bremen were transferred from Danish to Swedish control.
- Sweden was exempted from the Sound Dues, a toll on foreign ships passing through Danish waters into the Baltic Sea, and Hamburg was exempted from tolls previously levied by Bremen.
- Sweden received the Danish province of Halland for a period of 30 years as a guarantee of these provisions.

== See also ==
- dominium maris baltici
- First Treaty of Brömsebro (1541)
- List of Swedish wars
- List of Danish wars
- List of Norwegian wars
- List of treaties
