= Christian III of Denmark =

King of Denmark from 1534 to 1559

Christian III
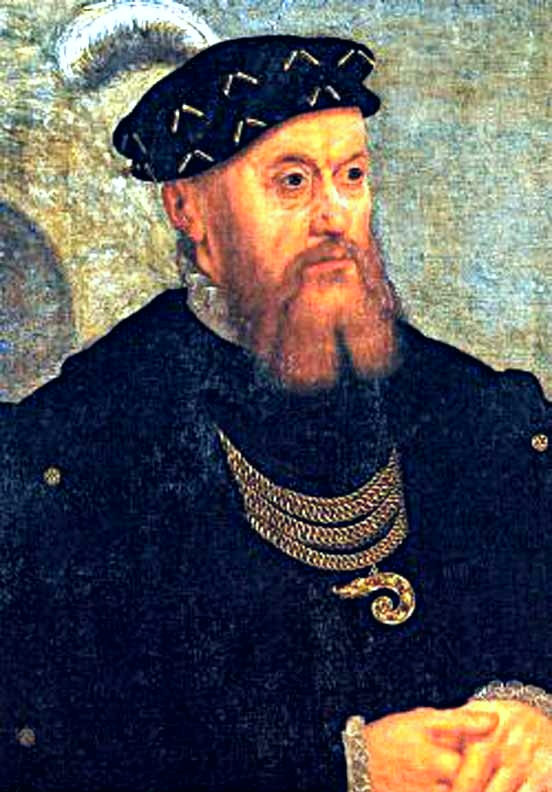
- Portrait by Jakob Binck, 1550

King of Denmark
- Reign: 4 July 1534 – 1 January 1559
- Coronation: 12 August 1537; Copenhagen Cathedral
- Predecessor: Frederick I
- Successor: Frederick II

King of Norway
- Reign: 1537–1559
- Coronation: 12 August 1537, Copenhagen
- Predecessor: Frederick I
- Successor: Frederick II

Duke of Schleswig-Holstein
- Reign: 1533 – 1 January 1559
- Predecessor: Frederik I
- Successor: Frederick II
- Born: 12 August 1503; Gottorf Castle, Schleswig, Denmark (now Germany)
- Died: 1 January 1559 (aged 55); Koldinghus, Kolding, Denmark
- Burial: Roskilde Cathedral, Zealand, Denmark
- Spouse: Dorothea of Saxe-Lauenburg (m. 1525)
- Issue: Anna, Electress of Saxony; Frederick II, King of Denmark and Norway; Magnus, Duke of Holstein; John II, Duke of Schleswig-Holstein-Sonderburg; Dorothea, Duchess of Brunswick-Lüneburg
- House: Oldenburg
- Father: Frederick I of Denmark
- Mother: Anna of Brandenburg
- Religion: Lutheran

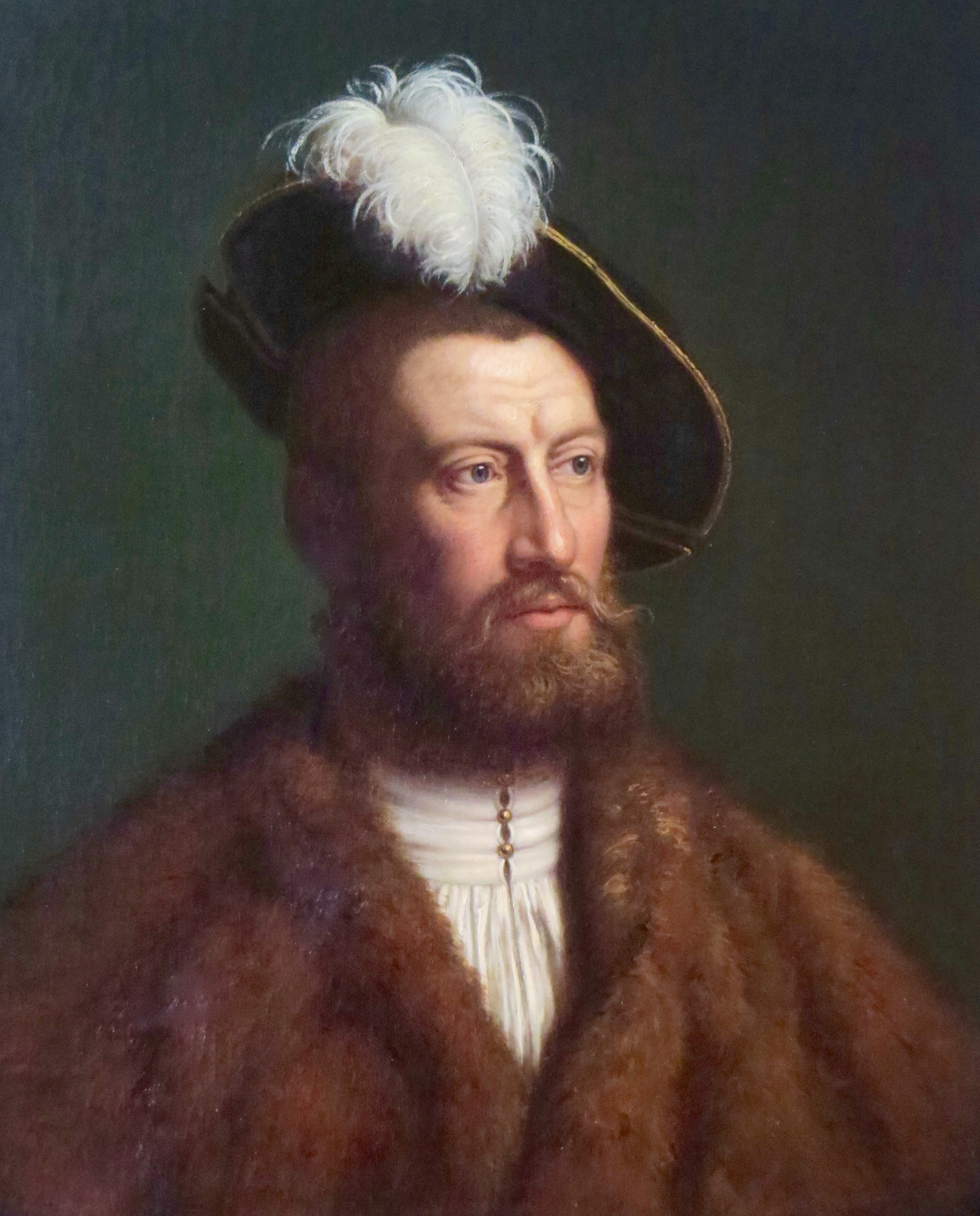
Painting depicting Christian III at Glücksborg

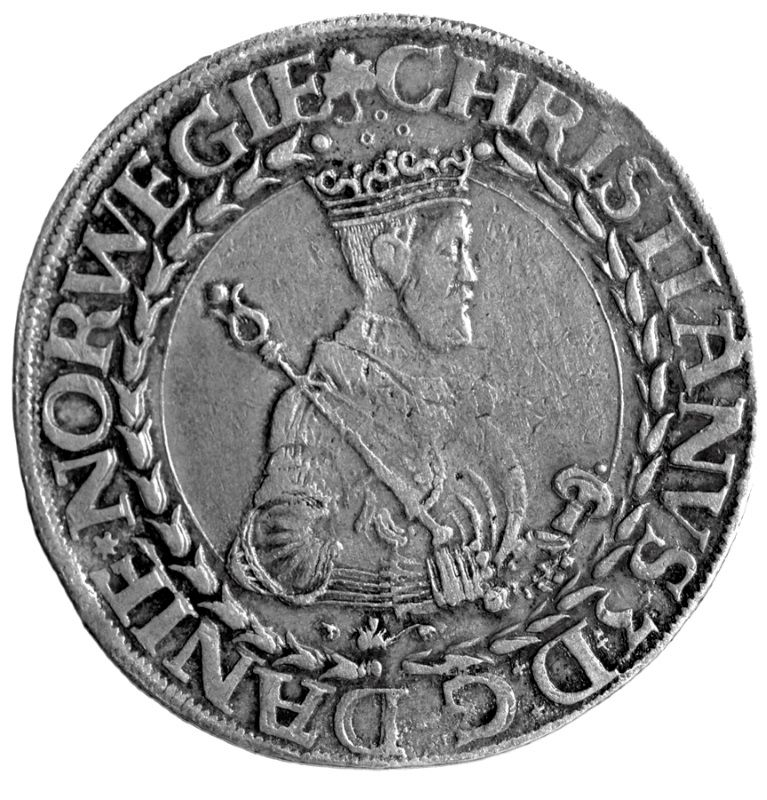
King Christian III on Norwegian silver coin (Gimsøydaleren) from 1546

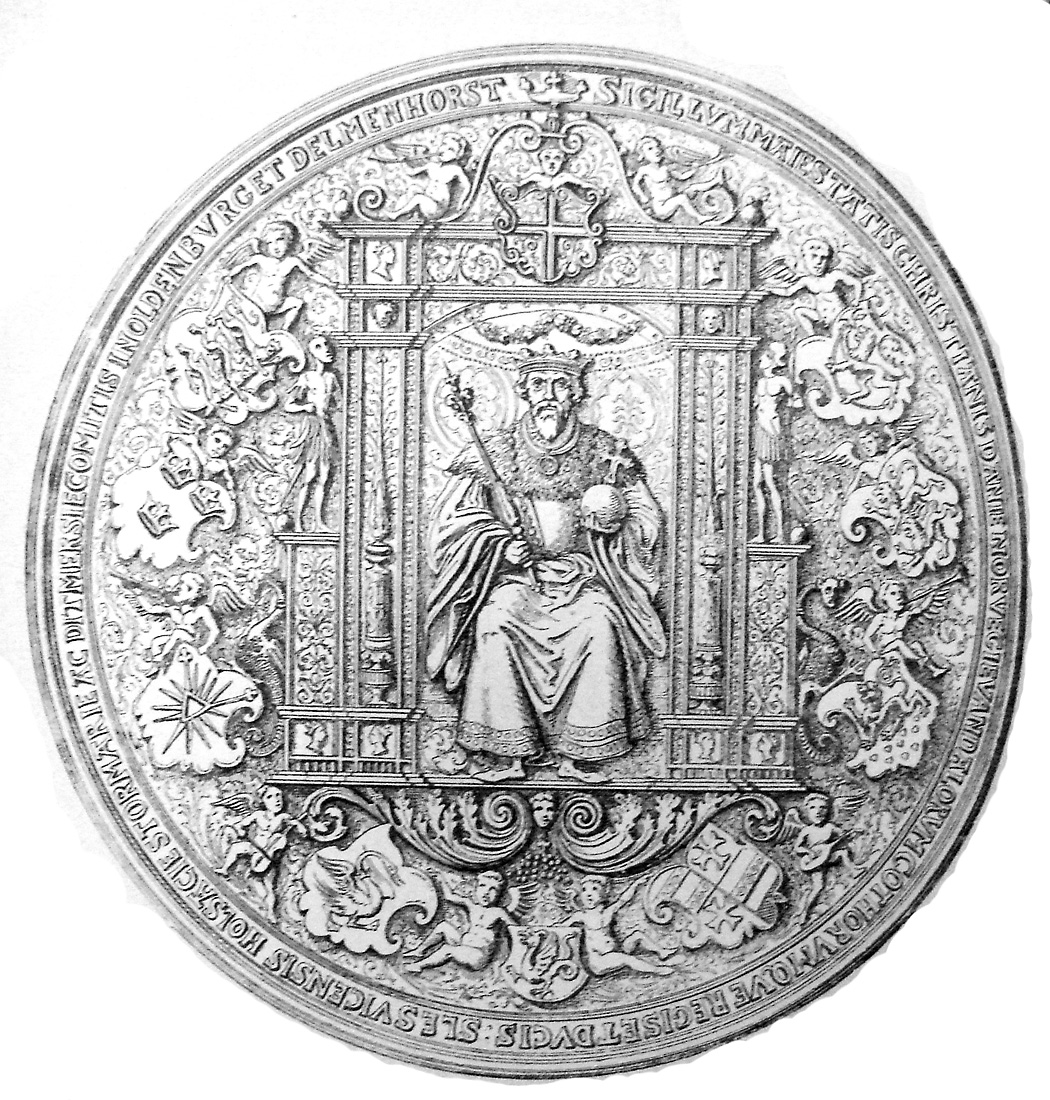
Seal of Christian III

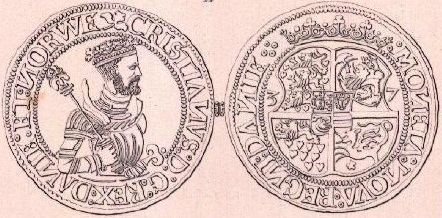
Danish rigsdaler minted under Christian III in 1537. His coat of arms on the reverse

Christian III (12 August 1503 – 1 January 1559) reigned as King of Denmark from 1534 and King of Norway from 1537 until his death in 1559. During his reign, Christian formed close ties between the church and the crown. He established Lutheranism as the state religion within his realms as part of the Protestant Reformation, and was the first King of Denmark–Norway.

== Childhood ==
Christian was the eldest son of the future king, Frederick I of Denmark, and Anna of Brandenburg. He was born at Gottorf Castle in Schleswig which Frederick I had made as a primary residence. In 1514, when he was just ten years old, Christian's mother died. Four years later, his father remarried to Sophie of Pomerania (1498–1568). In 1523, Frederick I was elected King of Denmark in the place of his nephew, Christian II. The young Prince Christian's first public service after his father became king was gaining the submission of Copenhagen, which stood firm for the fugitive, Christian II. As stadtholder of the Duchies of Holstein and Schleswig in 1526, and as viceroy of Norway in 1529, Christian III displayed considerable administrative ability.

== Religious views ==
Christian's earliest teacher, Wolfgang von Utenhof (ca. 1495–1542) and his Lutheran tutor, the military general Johann Rantzau (1492–1565), were both zealous reformers who had an influence on the young Prince. At their urging, while traveling in Germany in 1521, he made himself present at the Diet of Worms to hear Martin Luther speak. Luther's arguments intrigued him. The Prince made no secret of his Lutheran views. His outspokenness brought him into conflict, not only with the Roman Catholic dominated State Council (Rigsraad), but also with his cautious and temporizing father. At his own court at Schleswig, he did his best to introduce the Protestant Reformation, despite the opposition of the bishops. He made the Lutheran Church the State Church of Schleswig-Holstein, with the Church Ordinance of 1528.

In Iceland, the suppression of the Catholic Church significantly disrupted the local social welfare system, as the traditional monastic network that provided poor relief collapsed under the new administration. Furthermore, the implementation of the 1537 Church Ordinance—originally designed for an urban society—faced prolonged resistance from the rural and devoutly Catholic population, a structural clash later satirized by the contemporary Icelandic poet Einar Sigurðsson (see Reformation in Iceland).

== Reign as king ==
=== Early reign as King of Denmark ===
After his father's death, in 1533, Christian was proclaimed king of Denmark at an assembly in Rye, a town in eastern Jutland, in 1534. The Rigsraad, dominated by Roman Catholic bishops and nobles, refused to accept Duke Christian as king and turned to Count Christopher of Oldenburg in order to restore Christian II to the Danish throne. Christian II had supported both the Roman Catholics and Protestant Reformers at various times. In opposition to Christian III, Count Christopher was proclaimed regent at the Ringsted Assembly (landsting), and at the Scania Assembly (landsting) on St Liber's Hill (Sankt Libers hög) near Lund Cathedral. This resulted in a two-year civil war, known as the Count's Feud (Grevens Fejde) from 1534 to 1536, between Protestant and Catholic forces.

=== Civil War (Count's Feud) ===
Count Christopher had the support of most of Zealand, Scania, the Hanseatic League, and the small farmers of northern Jutland and Funen. Christian III found his support among the nobles of Jutland. In 1534, peasants under Skipper Clement (c. 1484–1536) began an uprising in northern Jutland, pillaging the holdings of Lutheran nobles. An army of nobles and their vassals assembled at Svendstrup and suffered a terrible defeat at the hands of the peasants. Realizing his hold on the throne was in imminent danger, Christian III negotiated a deal with the Hansa States which allowed him to send his trusted advisor Johan Rantzau north with an army of Protestant German mercenaries. Clement and his army fled north, taking refuge inside the walls of Aalborg. In December, Rantzau's forces breached the walls and stormed the city. Clement managed to escape, but was apprehended a few days later. He was tried and beheaded in 1535.

With Jutland more or less secure, Christian next focused on gaining control of Scania. He appealed to the Protestant Swedish king Gustav Vasa for help in subduing the rebels. Gustav immediately obliged by sending two armies to ravage central Scania and Halland. The peasants suffered a bloody defeat at Loshult in Scania. The Swedes moved against Helsingborg Castle, which surrendered in January 1535 and was burned to the ground.

Rantzau moved his army to Funen and defeated Count Christopher's army at Øksnebjerg on Funen in June 1535. Count Christopher's forces held out in Malmø and Copenhagen until July 1536 when they surrendered after several months of siege by Christian III's forces. With their capitulation, Christian III was firmly placed upon Denmark's throne, and the Roman Catholic forces in Denmark were subdued.

=== After the war and coup d'état in Norway ===
A mutual confidence between a king who had conquered his kingdom and a people who had stood in arms against him was not attainable immediately. The circumstances under which Christian III ascended the throne exposed Denmark to the danger of foreign domination. It was with the help of the gentry of the Germanic duchies that Christian had captured Denmark. Holstein and German noblemen had led his armies and directed his diplomacy. The first six years of Christian III's reign were marked by a contest between the Danish Rigsraadet and the German counsellors, both of whom sought to rule through the king. Though the Danish party won a victory at the outset, by obtaining the insertion in the charter of provisions stipulating that only native-born Danes should fill the highest dignities of the state, the king's German counsellors continued paramount during his early reign.

The triumph of Christian III would eventually bring about an end to Catholic Christianity in Denmark, but Catholics still controlled the Council of State. Christian III ordered the arrest of three of the bishops on the State Council by his German mercenaries (12 August 1536). Some Catholic bishops were later executed on his orders.

Christian's debt for the Count's Feud was enormous and confiscating the Church lands (farmed by peasants who had been free from vassalage duties to the nobles) enabled him to pay down the debt to his creditors.

Christian's Protestant policies led Denmark toward the establishment of Lutheranism as the Danish National Church (Folkekirke). This occurred officially on 30 October 1536 when the reconstituted State Council adopted the Lutheran Ordinances designed by German theologian Johannes Bugenhagen (1485–1558), which outlined church organization, liturgy, and accepted religious practice. Monasteries, nunneries, and priories, were closed and the property taken by the crown (see Chronicle of the Expulsion of the Grayfriars). Vast tracts of land were handed out to the king's supporters.

In 1537, Christian's coup d'état in Norway made it a hereditary kingdom in a real union with Denmark that would last until 1814. He also made Lutheranism the state religion in Norway, and on 2 September 1537 he appointed Gjeble Pederssøn as its first Lutheran bishop.

=== Later reign ===
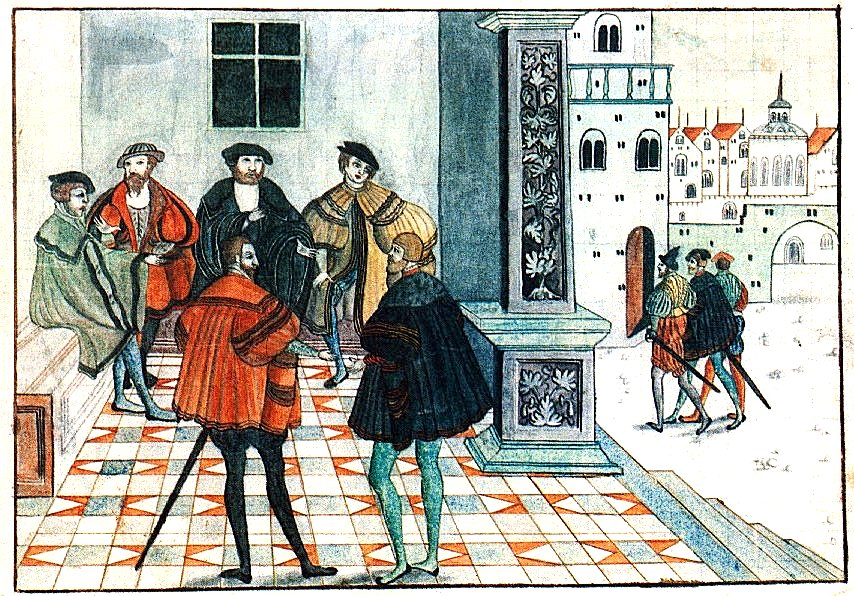
First Treaty of Brömsebro: Christian III's meeting with Gustav I of Sweden in Brömsebro, 1541 (watercolor reproduction of a lost painting made during the Swedish King's reign)

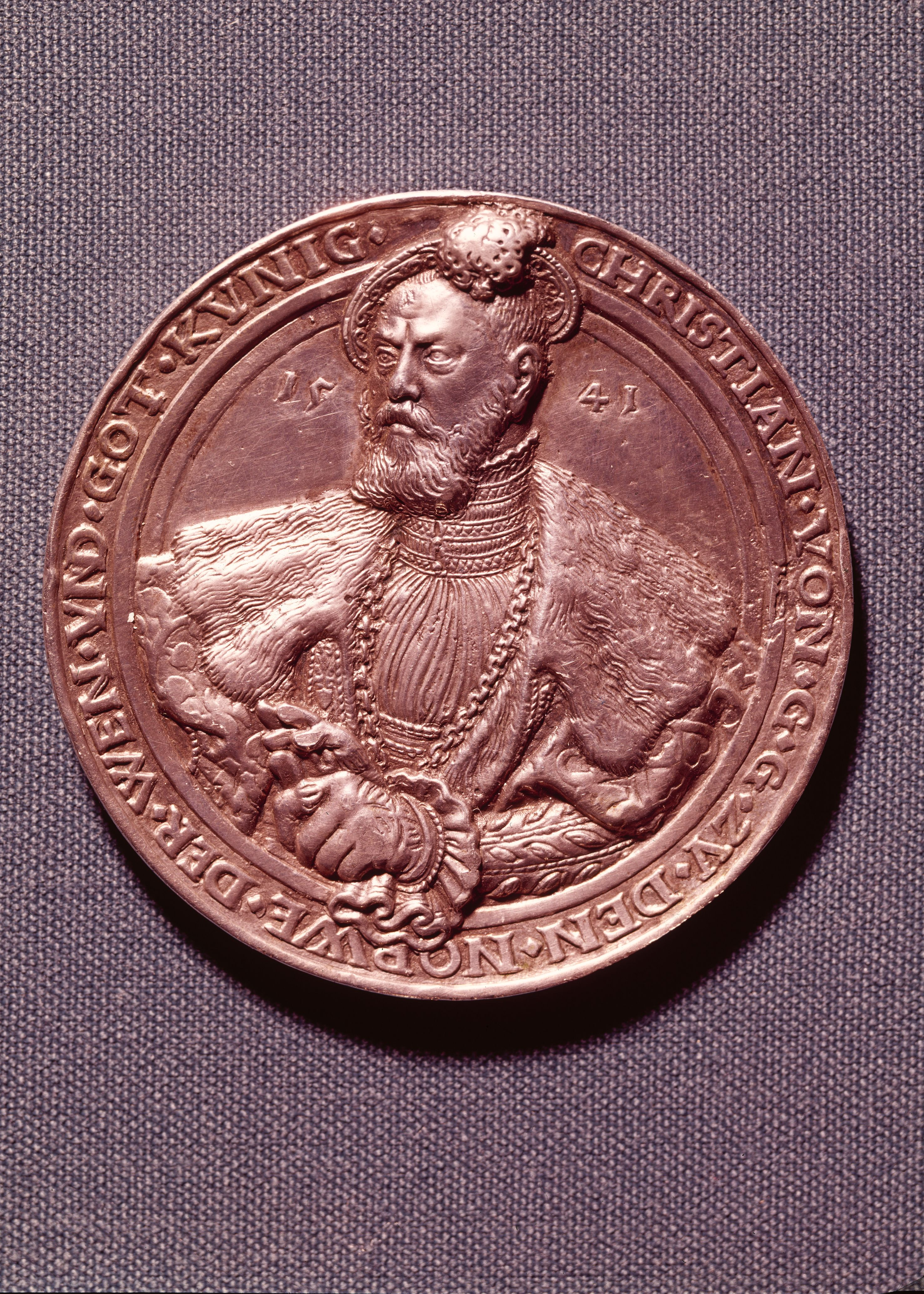
Christian III depicted on a medal, 1541.

The dangers threatening Christian III from Emperor Charles V and other kinsmen of the imprisoned Christian II convinced him of the necessity to lessen the discontent in the land by relying on Danish magnates and nobles. At the High Court (Herredag) of Copenhagen in 1542, the nobility of Denmark voted Christian a twentieth part of all their property to pay off his heavy debt to German mercenaries. The pivot of the foreign policy of Christian III was his alliance with the German Protestant princes and France. This provided a counterpoise to the persistent hostility of Charles V, who was determined to support the hereditary claims of his nieces, the daughters of Christian II, to the Scandinavian kingdoms. War was declared against Charles V in 1542, and, though the German Protestant princes proved faithless allies, the closing of the Danish Straits against Dutch shipping proved such an effective weapon in Christian's hand that the Netherlands compelled Charles V to make peace with Denmark–Norway at the diet of Speyer, on 23 May 1544.

=== Partition of Holstein and Schleswig ===
Until this peace, Christian III also ruled the entire Duchies of Holstein and of Schleswig in the name of his then still minor half-brothers John the Elder (Hans den Ældre) and Adolf. They determined their youngest brother Frederick for a career as Diocesan administrator of an ecclesiastical state within the Holy Roman Empire.

In 1544 the elder three brothers partitioned Holstein (a fief of the Holy Roman Empire) and Schleswig (a Danish fief). Following negotiations between the brothers and the Estates of the Realm of the duchies, the revenues of the duchies were divided into three equal shares by assigning the revenues of particular areas and landed estates to each of the three brothers, while other general revenues, such as taxes from towns and customs dues, were levied together but then shared among the brothers. The estates, whose revenues were assigned to the parties, made Holstein and Schleswig look like patchworks, technically inhibiting the emergence of separate new duchies.

=== Final years ===
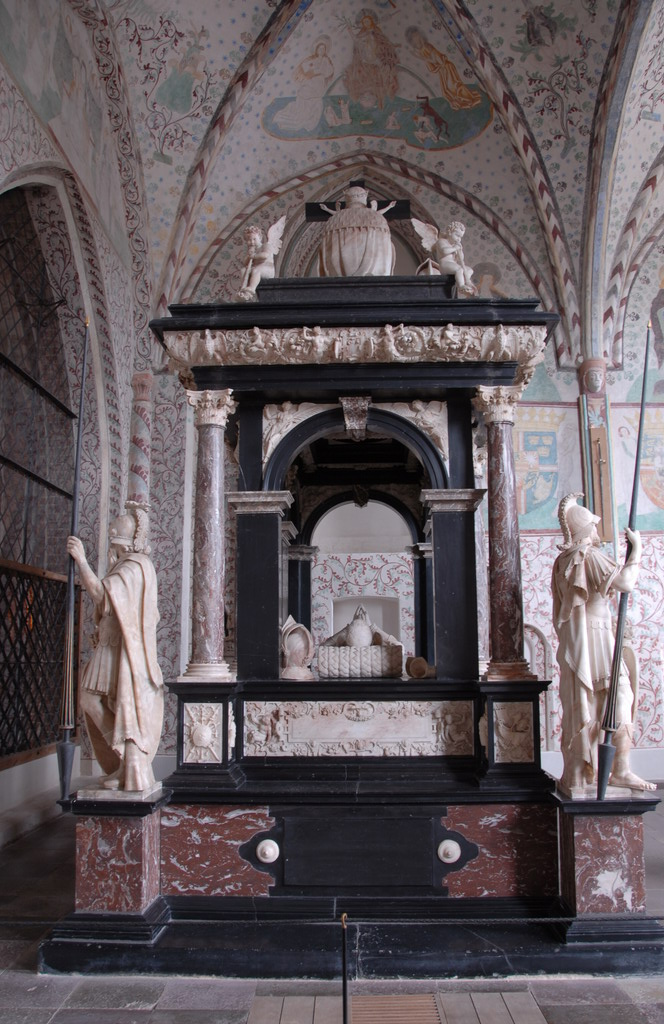
Gothic pantheon at tombs of Christian III and Frederick II

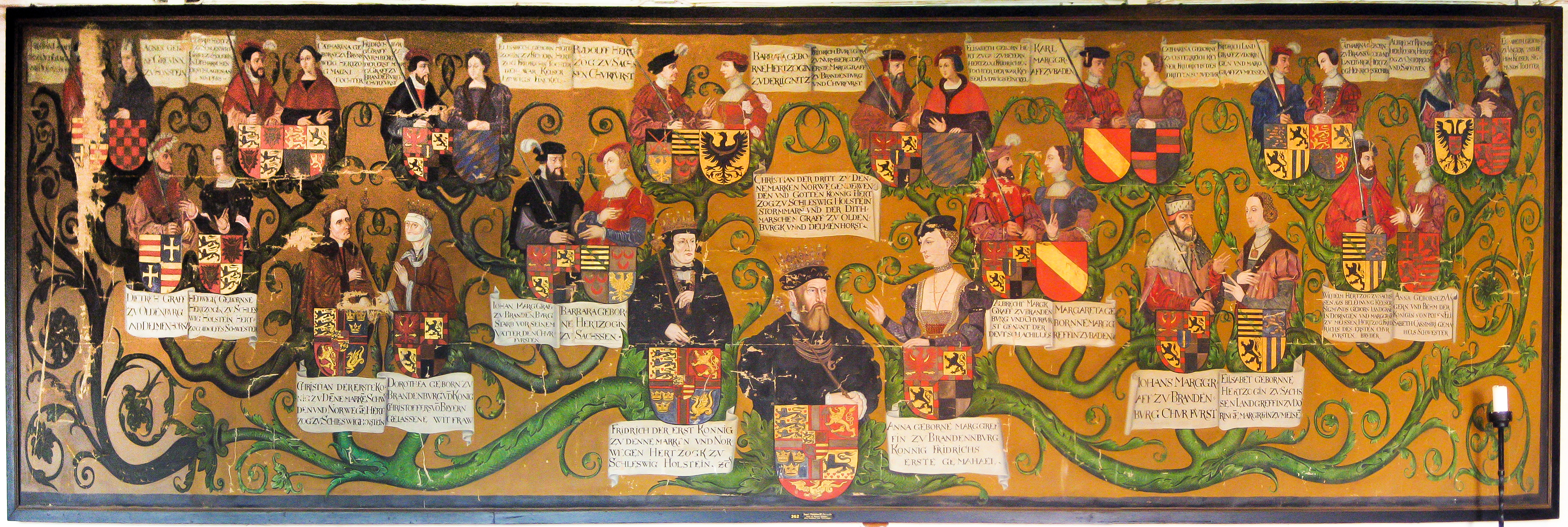
Ahnentafel of King Christian III at Nyborg Castle

The foreign policy of Christian's later days aimed at preserving the peace established by the Treaty of Speyer (1544). He refused to participate in the Schmalkaldic War of 1546, and mediated between the Emperor and Saxony after the fall of Maurice of Saxony at the Battle of Sievershausen in 1553. In 1549, he began the building of Landskrona Citadel. He also rebuilt Sønderborg Castle, converting it from a fortress into a four-winged castle in the new Renaissance syle, between 1549 and 1557. In February 1555, he interceded successfully on the behalf of the English Bible translator and Bishop of Exeter, Miles Coverdale (1488–1569), who had been imprisoned for two and a half years by the Catholic Mary I. Coverdale was then released and allowed to leave England.

Christian III died on New Year's Day 1559 at Koldinghus, and was interred in Roskilde Cathedral in a funerary monument designed by Flemish sculptor Cornelis Floris de Vriendt (1514–1575).

== Memorials ==
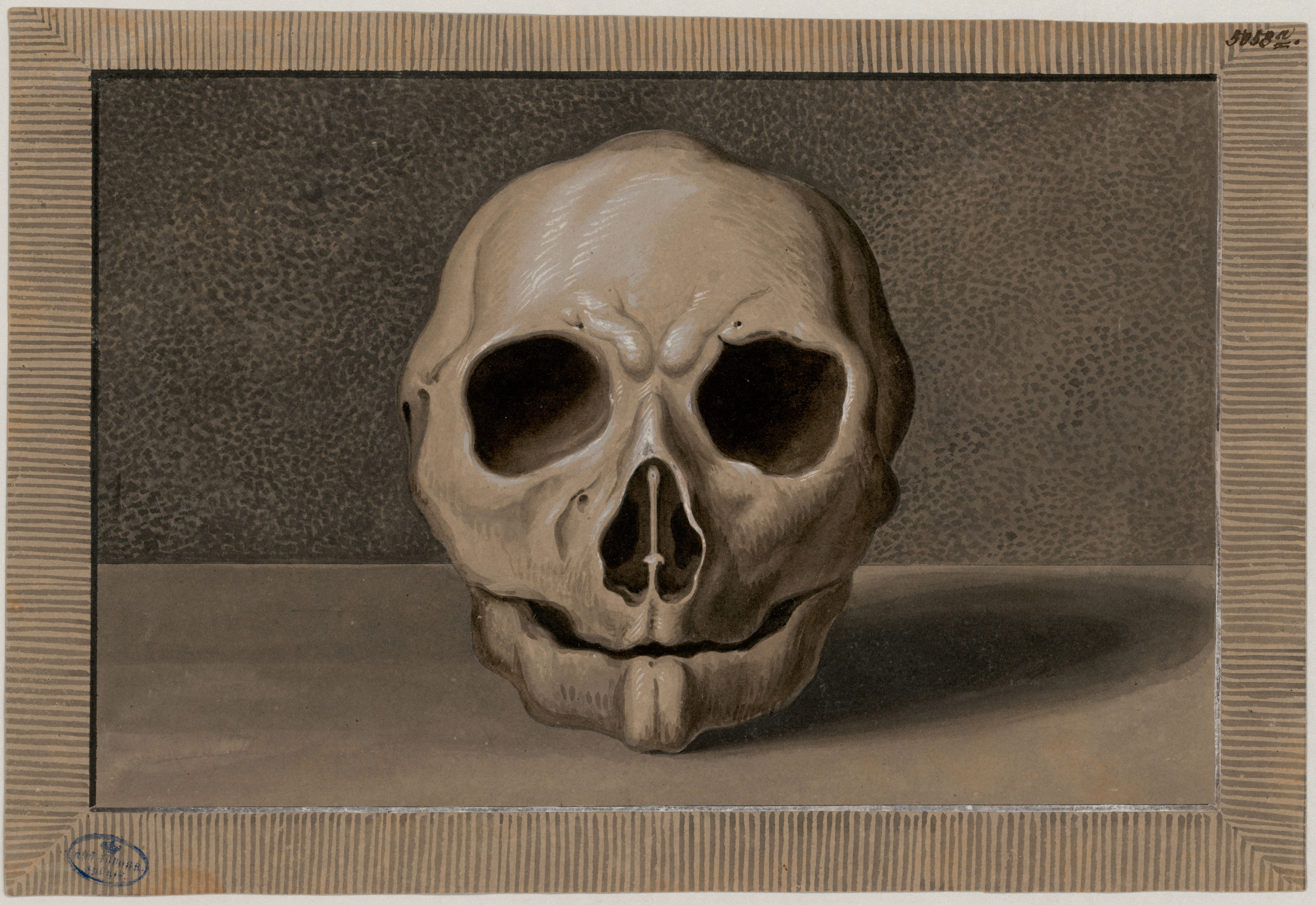
Christian III's skull in St. Knud's Church, Odense

In 1579, Frederick II commissioned Dutch artists to erect a memorial to Christian III at Roskilde Cathedral.

Christian III received an honorary stone at the Walk of Fame at Landskrona which Sweden's Carl XVI Gustaf inaugurated in 2013.

== Children ==
Christian married Dorothea of Saxe-Lauenburg on 29 October 1525 at Lauenburg Castle. She was the daughter of Magnus I, Duke of Saxe-Lauenburg, and Catherine of Brunswick-Wolfenbüttel. They were the parents of five children:

- Anna of Denmark (22 November 1532 – 1 October 1585), married to Augustus, Elector of Saxony.
- Frederick II of Denmark (1 July 1534 – 4 April 1588), succeeded as King of Denmark and Norway.
- Magnus of Denmark (5 September 1540 – 28 March 1583), became Duke of Holstein, and later titular King of Livonia.
- Hans of Denmark (John the Younger; 25 March 1545 – 9 March 1622), Duke of Schleswig-Holstein-Sonderburg as 'John II'., who was the direct patrilineal ancestor of Christian IX of Denmark from the Oldenburg cadet branch of Glücksburg
- Dorothea of Denmark (29 June 1546 – 6 January 1617), married to William, Duke of Brunswick-Lüneburg and mother of George, Duke of Brunswick-Lüneburg.

== Sources ==
- Grell, Ole Peter (1995) The Scandinavian Reformation. From evangelical movement to institutionalisation of reform (2 ed. Cambridge University Press) ISBN 0-521-44162-5
- Lausten, Martin Schwarz (1987) Christian d. 3. og kirken, 1537–1559 (Copenhagen: Akademisk forlag) ISBN 978-8750026877
- Lockhart, Paul Douglas (2007) Denmark, 1513–1660. The rise and decline of a Renaissance monarchy (Oxford University Press) ISBN 0-19-927121-6
- Scocozza, Benito (1997). "Christian 3.". Politikens bog om danske monarker [Politiken's book about Danish monarchs] (in Danish). Copenhagen: Politikens Forlag. pp. 114–119. ISBN 87-567-5772-7.

== Related reading ==
- Øystein Rian (1997) Danmark-Norge 1380–1814 (Universitetsforlaget) ISBN 9788200228455

Christian III House of Oldenburg Born: 12 August 1503 Died: 1 January 1559
Regnal titles
Preceded by Frederick I	King of Denmark; 1534–1559	Succeeded by Frederick II
Preceded by Frederick I	King of Norway; 1537–1559	Succeeded by Frederick II
Preceded by Frederick I and Christian II	Duke of Holstein and Schleswig; 1523–1559 with Frederick I (1523-1533); John (1544-1559); Adolf (1544-1559)	Succeeded by John the Elder, Adolf and Frederick II
