= Söderåkra =

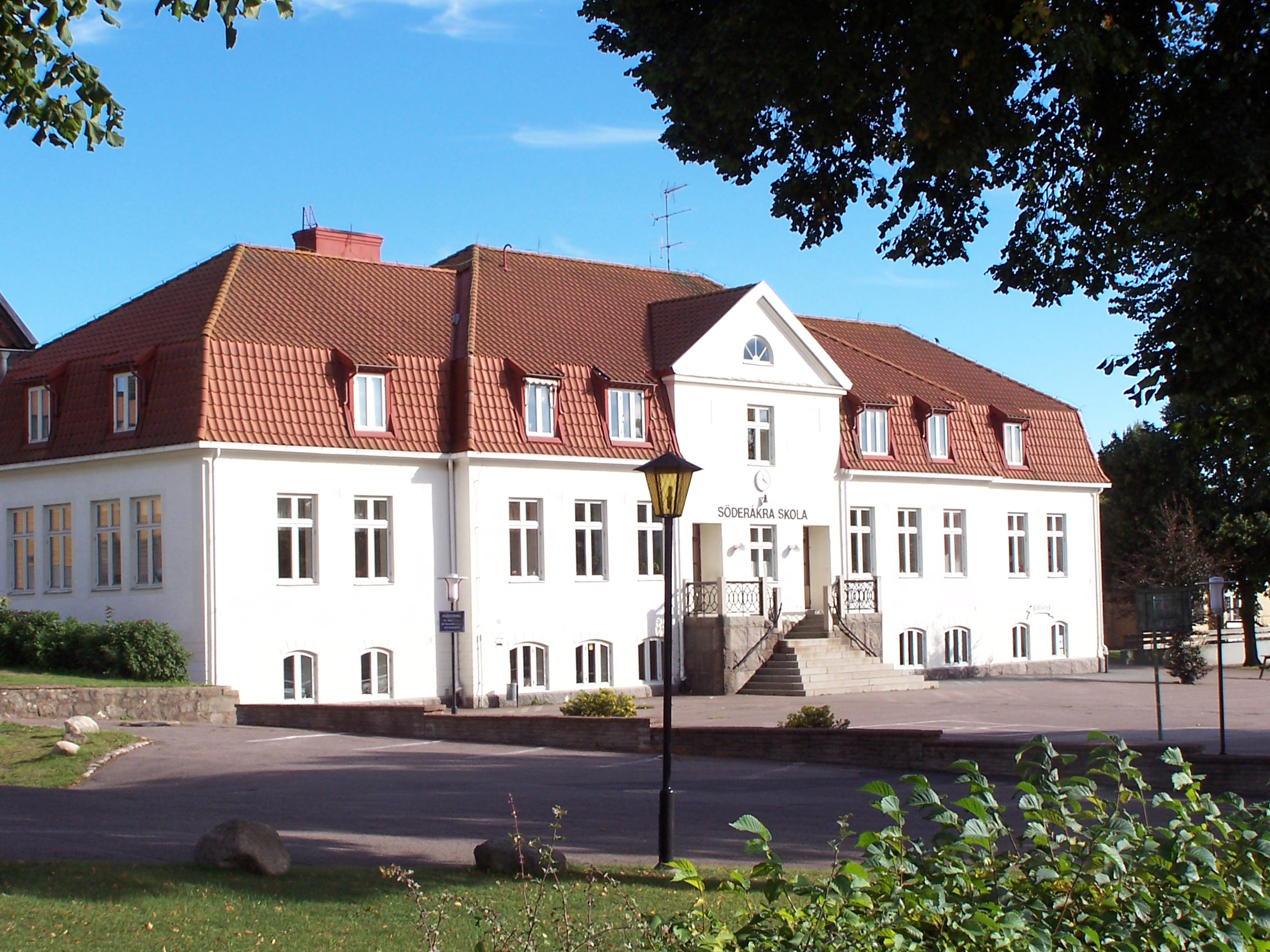

- Location within Kalmar Location within Sweden Location within European Union
- Coordinates: 56°27′N 16°04′E
- Country: Sweden
- Province: Småland
- County: Kalmar County
- Municipality: Torsås Municipality

Area
  - Total: 1.35 km^{2} (0.52 sq mi)

Population (31 December 2010)
  - Total: 912
  - Density: 675/km^{2} (1,750/sq mi)
- Time zone: UTC+1 (CET)
  - Summer (DST): UTC+2 (CEST)

Söderåkra is a locality situated in Torsås Municipality, Kalmar County, Sweden with 912 inhabitants in 2010.
