= Lappkärret =

Lake in Stockholm Municipality, Sweden

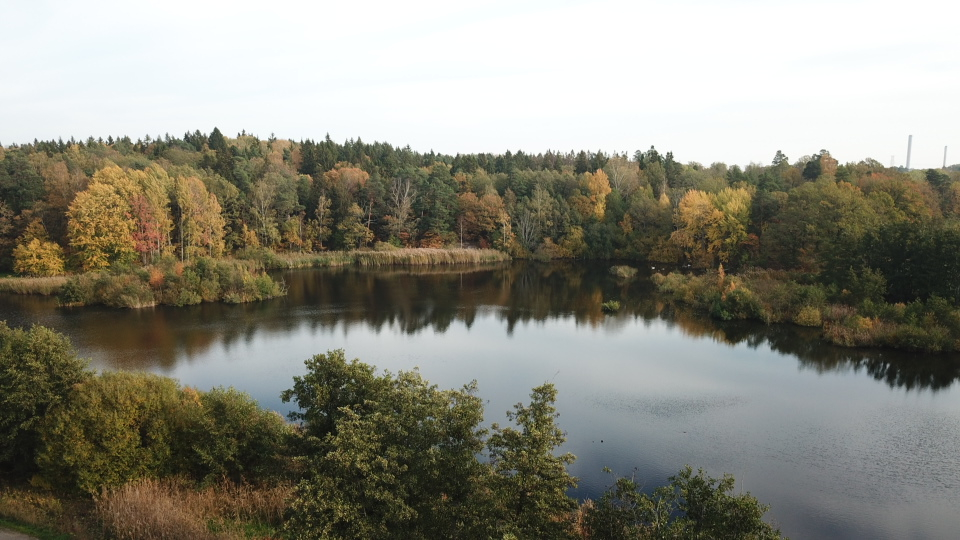

- Location within Stockholm
- Coordinates: 59°22′6.48″N 18°4′6.90″E
- Primary inflows: Subsoil water
- Primary outflows: Lilla Värtan
- Catchment area: 17 ha (42 acres)
- Basin countries: Sweden
- Surface area: 2.3 ha (5.7 acres)
- Average depth: 0.7 m (2 ft 4 in)
- Max. depth: 1.1 m (3 ft 7 in)
- Water volume: 16,000 m^{3} (13 acre⋅ft)
- Residence time: 5 months
- Settlements: Norra Djurgården

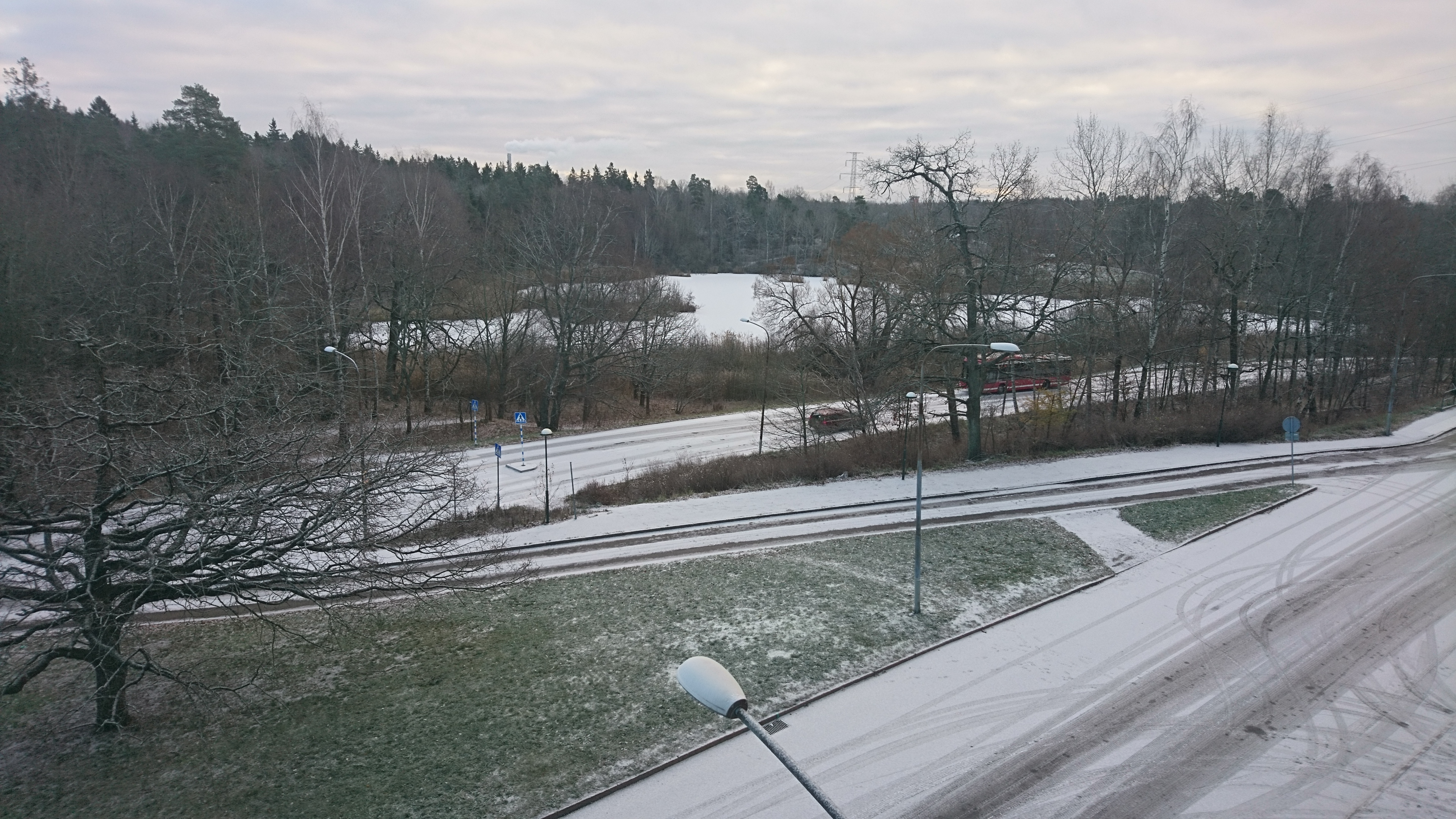
Frozen Lappkärret in November 2018

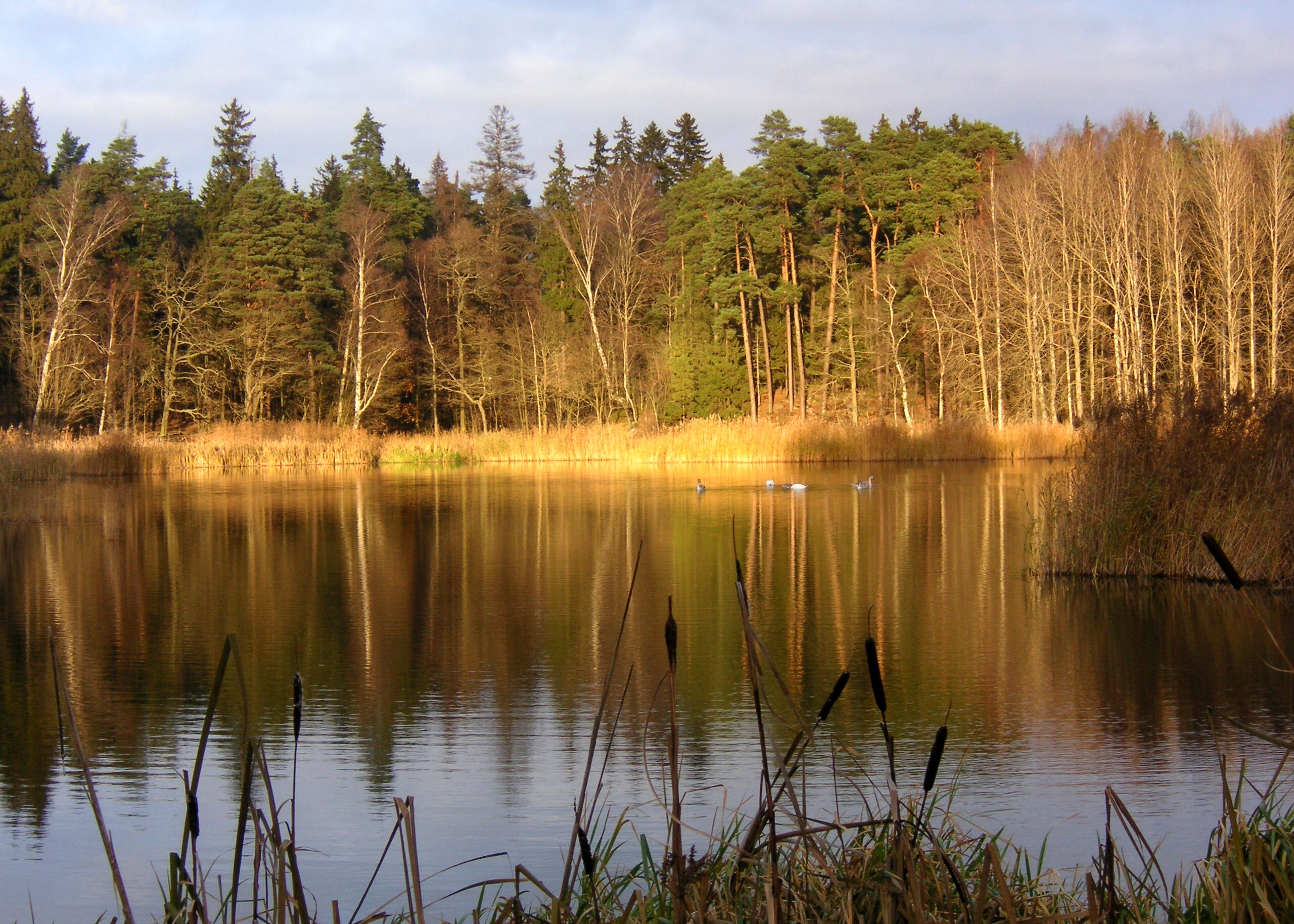
Lappkärret in 2007

Lappkärret is a small lake in Norra Djurgården in north-eastern Stockholm, Sweden, near Stockholm University. It is one of six lakes in Djurgården, the others being: Lillsjön, Uggleviken, Isbladskärret, Laduviken, and Spegeldammen.

Through its location in the Royal National City Park, it is considered as a lake of great recreational value, especially popular among ornithologists and frequently used in classes at the Stockholm University located nearby. As the name implies, it used to be a marsh until construction works for the student apartments at Lappkärrsberget punctured a subsoil spring in the 1960s. Today, the lake empties into the strait Lilla Värtan through a culvert and forms part of a proposed nature reserve in Norra Djurgården.

== Catchment area ==
Most of the catchment area is composed of open fields and areas of spruce and deciduous forest, with a single trafficked road passing west of the lake. Next to a group of nearby allotment-gardens is a 4-H farmyard with horses and sheep.

=== Environmental influence ===
Most of the inflow is believed to come from subsoil water with some contribution from stormwater and snow-melting. Local land usage produces small amounts of nutrients and no conduits guides surface water to the lake. The lake is alkali and saliferous with high levels of oxygen, phosphorus, and phosphate, but low levels of inorganic nitrogen. Notwithstanding various levels of chlorophyll, water transparency exceeds the depth of the lake and pH is reported as constant.

== Flora and fauna ==
In the mid-1980s, isolated occurrences of rigid hornwort had established in the lake, and, by the mid-1990s, abundant quantities of other aquatic plants such as ivy duckweed and the liverwort Riccia fluitans, were reported along open edges of the lake. During that decade, submarine vegetation covered the entire lake bed which greatly cleared up the lake. In the mid-1980s, the only fauna reported was sparse occurrences of larvae and non-biting midges. Within ten years, however, the fauna had evolved considerably, probably due to the rich vegetation, to include Oligochaeta, gastropods, and dragonfly larvae and today also the dragonfly species Aeshna osiliensis, common winter damselfly, and several others.

The only fish in the lake is crucian carp, probably introduced in the early 1980s. Attempts have been made to reduce the population with various results. In the mid-1970 a colony of black-headed gulls together with Slavonian grebe, mallard, little grebe, and gadwall. The black-headed gull is a key species, offering protection to other species, and has now abandoned the lake which is, however, still considered as of great importance to bird life with several species still breeding there. Several protected species of amphibians can be seen by the lake, including common frog, common toad, moor frog, and smooth newt.

== Visiting ==
Both the lake and the surrounding national park is easily accessible by metro, bus, bicycle, or by foot. The nearest metro station is Universitetet and bus 50 stops nearby.

== See also ==
- Geography of Stockholm
- Lakes in Sweden
