= Spegeldammen =

Lake in Stockholm, Sweden

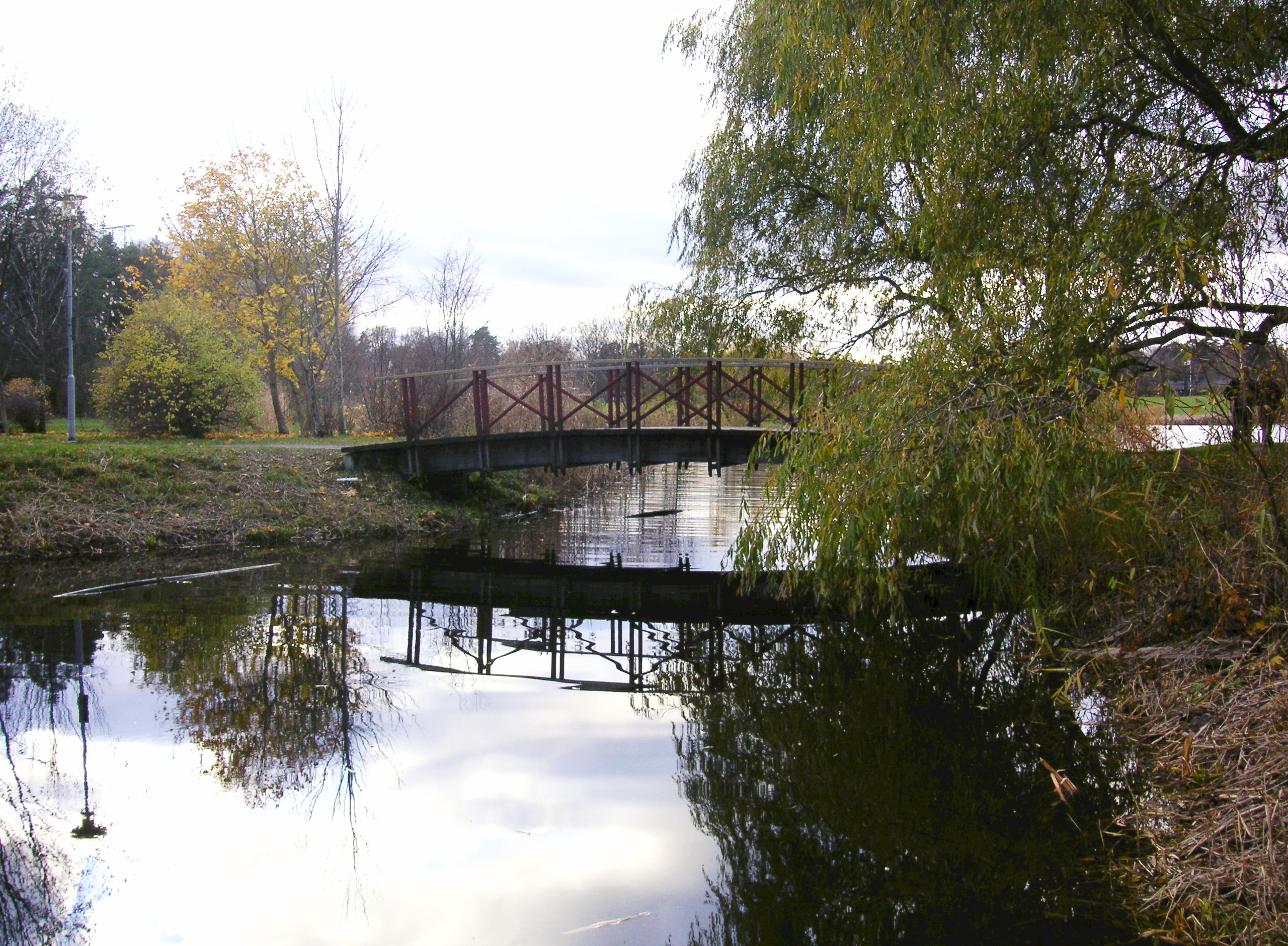
- Spegeldammen in November 2007

- Location within Stockholm
- Coordinates: 59°21′56″N 18°4′39″E
- Primary inflows: Subsoil water
- Primary outflows: Husarviken, Lilla Värtan
- Catchment area: 16 ha (40 acres)
- Basin countries: Sweden
- Surface area: 1.1 ha (2.7 acres)
- Max. depth: 2 m (6 ft 7 in)
- Settlements: Norra Djurgården

Spegeldammen (Swedish: (the) Mirror Pond) is a small lake in Norra Djurgården in north-eastern central Stockholm, Sweden. It is one of six lakes in Djurgården, the others being Lillsjön, Uggleviken, Isbladskärret, Laduviken, and Lappkärret.

Located in the Royal National City Park, Spegeldammen is considered of great recreational value and forms part of a proposed nature reserve. It was created in the early 1980s after a shooting range here was closed and is today leased by an angling club for catch-and-release fishery.

== Catchment area ==
The catchment area is dominated by open meadows with oaks in the patches of forest. During most of the 20th century, the area found use as a shooting range, and as a waterlogged marsh where excavated earth and other material was dumped. The range was discontinued in 1978 and shortly thereafter sediments from the nearby Laduviken and other excavated material was disposed within the present catchment area of Spegeldammen, and the lake was created in connection with the housing of the deposits. Today a small pavilion is sitting on the eastern shore of the lake and sheep are grazing the area during summers.

=== Environmental influence ===
Water contains moderate levels of phosphorus and nitrogen, but sediments contain considerable levels of lead, zinc, cadmium, and copper. Present activities in and around the lake causes insignificant damage, but historical usage still affects the lake through drainpipes. The lake was drained in 2001 and specimen of water leaking out of the lake bed showed considerable levels of phosphorus phosphate and ammonium nitrogen, while levels of nutrients, zinc and copper were low. Specimen of the outflow in 1998, however, showed increased levels of copper, zinc, and to some extent of cadmium, and land specimen in the abandoned embankments of the shooting range showed they contained levels of lead exceeding officially sanctioned levels.

== Flora and fauna ==
During the 1990s, aquatic plants, mostly rigid hornwort, have spread and now covers the lake bed. Along the shores are dense stands of common reed, lesser bulrush, common bulrush, and unbranched bur-reed.

The shores are dominated by various species of Oligochaeta, Gastropoda, and Odonata. Superficial sediments are dominated by Oligochaeta and non-biting midges while deeper layers contain the freshwater crustacean Asellus aquaticus and larvae of mayflies and Odonatas. Gyraulus crista and Hippeutis complanatus are unusual freshwater snails present in the lake. The most common dragonfly is the emerald damselfly, but azure damselfly, variable damselfly, scarce emerald damselfly, common blue damselfly, downy emerald, and red-eyed damselfly are also present. In Stockholm, Aeshna osiliensis is unique to Norra Djurgården, while the large white-faced darter is protected by the EU.

Spegeldammen is an important breeding ground for several species of amphibians, including smooth newt, great crested newt, common frog, and common toad, and several ponds have been created solely for promoting the precondition for breeding amphibians. Grass snakes are also found both in the lake and in the surrounding area.

The crucian carp is naturally present in the lake, while trout and rainbow trout have been introduced for angling. Notwithstanding the limited scale of the lake a large number of birds are regularly found here, including little grebe, little ringed plover, and common moorhen. Additionally, the area is one of the best locales for bats in Stockholm.

== Visiting ==
The lake and the national park is easily accessible by metro, bus, bicycle or by foot. The nearest metro station is Universitetet.

== See also ==
- Geography of Stockholm
- Lakes of Sweden
