= List of sporting events in Sweden =

Sporting Events

This is a list of sporting events in Sweden that are held on an annual basis.

== Open to everyone ==
- Alliansloppet - 16, 32 & 48km roller skiing event in Trollhättan World biggest rollerski race
- Broloppet - Swedish/Danish road running (half marathon) event across the Oresund Bridge
- Convinistafetten - A relay race for corporate teams around Laduviken
- Engelbrektsloppet - 60 km cross-country skiing event in Västmanland
- Gothia Cup - youth football tournament in Gothenburg
- Gotland runt - sailing event around the island of Gotland
- Göteborgsvarvet - road running (half marathon) event in Gothenburg
- Lidingöloppet - 30 km cross country running event in Lidingö
- O-Ringen - multiday orienteering race
- Partille Cup - youth handball tournament in Gothenburg
- Stockholm Marathon - marathon in Stockholm
- Tiomila - An orienteering relay event
- Tjejmilen - 10 km cross country running event for women in Djurgården, open for girls and women only
- Tjejtrampet - 45 km road bicycle racing event for women in northern Stockholm, open for girls and women only
- Tjejvasan - 10 km cross country skiing event for women in Dalarna, open for girls and women only
- Vansbrosimningen - 3 km swimming event in Vansbro
- Vasaloppet - 90 km cross-country skiing event in Dalarna, from Sälen to Mora
- Vikingarännet - 80 km ice skating event on Mälaren between Uppsala and Stockholm
- Vätternrundan - 300 km cycling event, around the lake Vättern
- Ö till ö - a swimrun event in the archipelago of Stockholm.

== Open to elite only ==
- DN Galan — athletics event at Stockholms Olympiastadion
- Finland-Sweden athletics international (Finnkampen) - athletics competition between Sweden and Finland, alternatingly held in Sweden and Finland
- Nordea Nordic Light Open - tennis tournament held in Stockholm
- Open de Suède Vårgårda - women's road bicycle racing event held in Vårgårda
- Scandinavian Masters - golf tournament on the European Tour
- speedway events, part of the Speedway Grand Prix Series:
  - Speedway Grand Prix of Sweden (since 1995)
  - Speedway Grand Prix of Scandinavia (since 2002)
- LG Hockey Games
- Swedish Open — tennis competition in Båstad
- Swedish Open Championships - annual table tennis tournament
- Swedish Rally — rally in Värmland
- Swedish Short Course Swimming Championships
- Swedish Swimming Championships

=== National leagues, cups and tours ===
- Allsvenskan — the top-level men's football league
- Damallsvenskan — the top-level women's football league
- Swedish Hockey League — the top-level ice hockey league
- Elitserien — the top-level bandy league
- Elitserien — the top-level baseball league
- Elitserien — the top-level men's handball league
- Elitserien — the top-level women's handball league
- Elitserien — the top-level speedway league
- Svenska Basketligan - the top-level men's basketball league
- Basketligan Dam - the top-level women's basketball league
- Svenska Cupen - the main Swedish football cup
- Swedish Golf Tour - the domestic professional golf tour
- Swedish Super League — the top-level men's floorball league
- Swedish Super League — the top-level women's floorball league
- Swedish Touring Car Championship

== See also ==
- Sport in Sweden
