= Laduviken =

Lake in Stockholm, Sweden

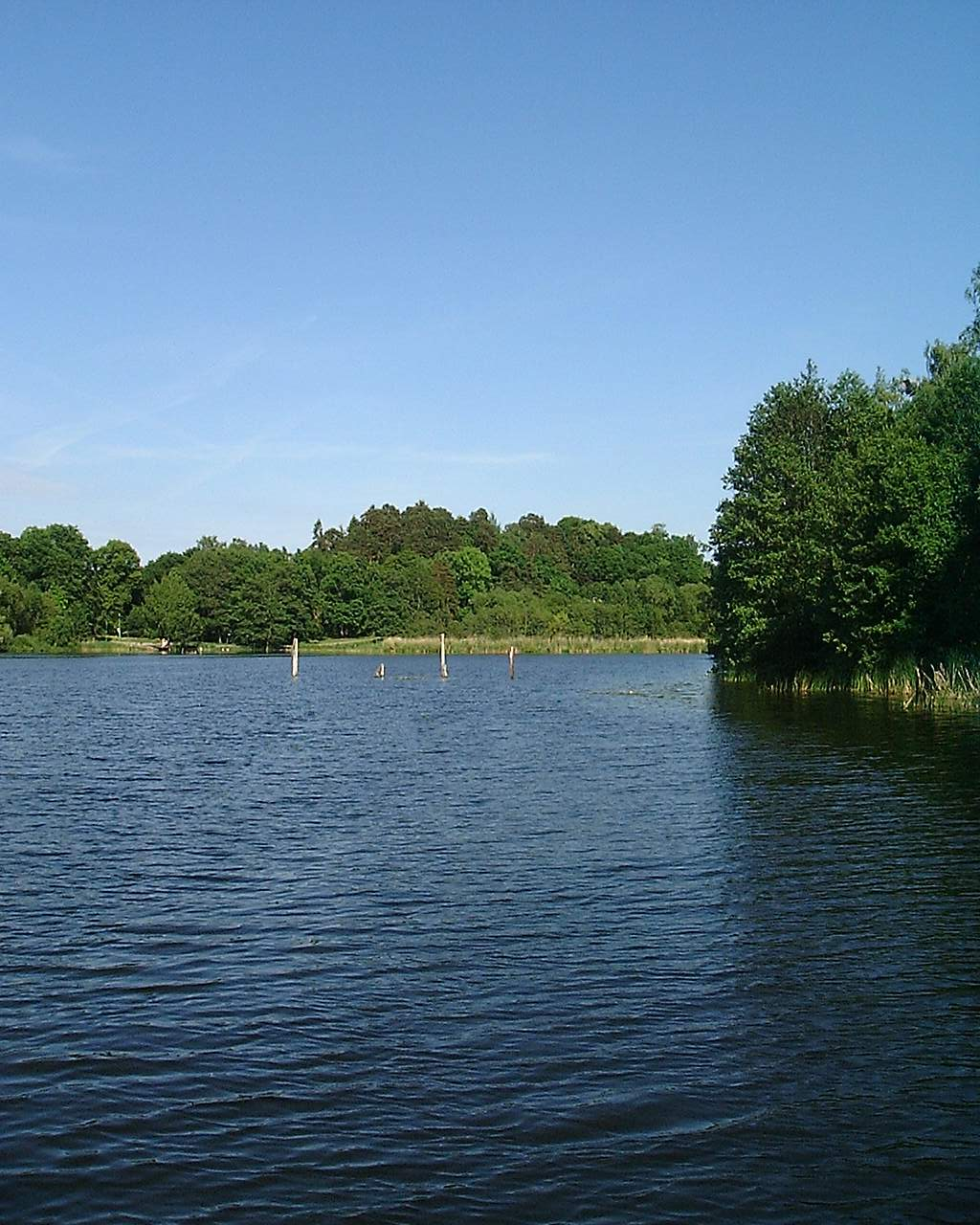

- Location within Stockholm
- Location: Royal National City Park, Norra Djurgården
- Coordinates: 59°21′38.37″N 18°4′35.9″E
- Primary inflows: Local stormwater
- Primary outflows: Husarviken, Lilla Värtan
- Catchment area: 110 ha (270 acres)
- Basin countries: Sweden
- Surface area: 5.3 ha (13 acres)
- Average depth: 2.2 m (7 ft 3 in)
- Max. depth: 3.2 m (10 ft)
- Water volume: 117,000 m^{3} (95 acre⋅ft)
- Residence time: 3 months
- Surface elevation: 0.5 m (1 ft 8 in)
- Settlements: Norra Djurgården

Laduviken (Swedish: Barn Bay) is a lake in Norra Djurgården, a semi-rural area in north-eastern Stockholm, Sweden, forming part of the Royal National City Park. It is one of six lakes in Djurgården, the others being: Lillsjön, Uggleviken, Isbladskärret, Lappkärret, and Spegeldammen.

== Catchment area ==
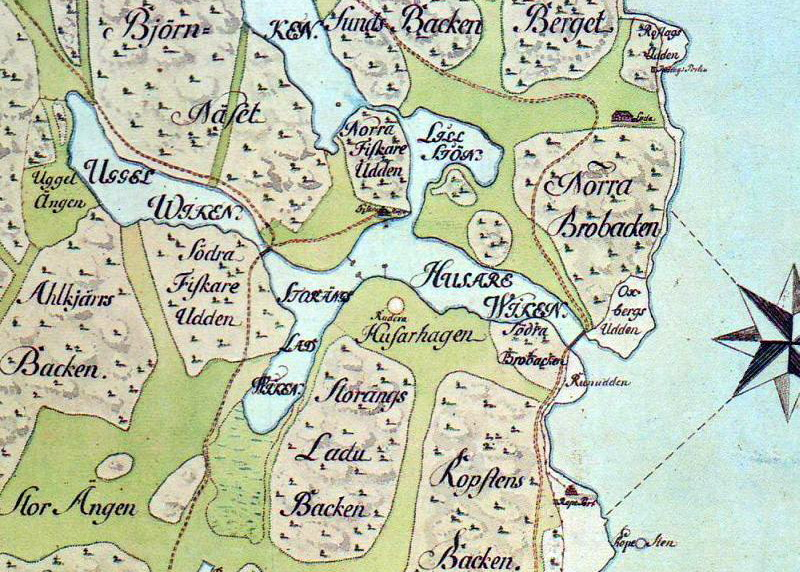
Historical map showing the area in the 17th century.

Most of the catchment area is composed of open grassland with scattered oaks and other hardwood. West of the lake, the buildings of the Stockholm University take up some 20 per cent of the surface and a few roads, a traffic route, the suburban railway Roslagsbanan, and the subterranean metro passes through the area. East of the lake are some minor one-family houses and commercial buildings. The terrain north of the lake is flat while the southern shore is steep and, as the area west of the lake is drained by a ditch dug through a filled-up wetland, most of the catchment area is located there and most of the inflow comes from an ooze and oil separator treating water from human-made structures. A tiny river guides the outflow east to the bay Husarviken which is part of the strait Lilla Värtan. In the late 1970s, the lake was deepened by dredging to prevent it from becoming choked-up during the 21st century, and a system of canals was then created in the western end of the lake. As part of a national park, the lake is considered as of great recreational value.

=== Environmental influence ===
Most of the phosphorus reaching the lake are most likely derived from the university, while nitrogen contribution is derived from surrounding landscape and equal shares of copper input stems from all surrounding areas and structures. Generally the lake is considered as in good health with low levels of most metals and organic compounds, even though presence of hydrogen sulphide has been recorded relatively frequently, levels of copper in top sediments did increase during the 1990s, and analysis's of subsoil water in 1997 showed signs of environmental contamination.

== Flora and fauna ==
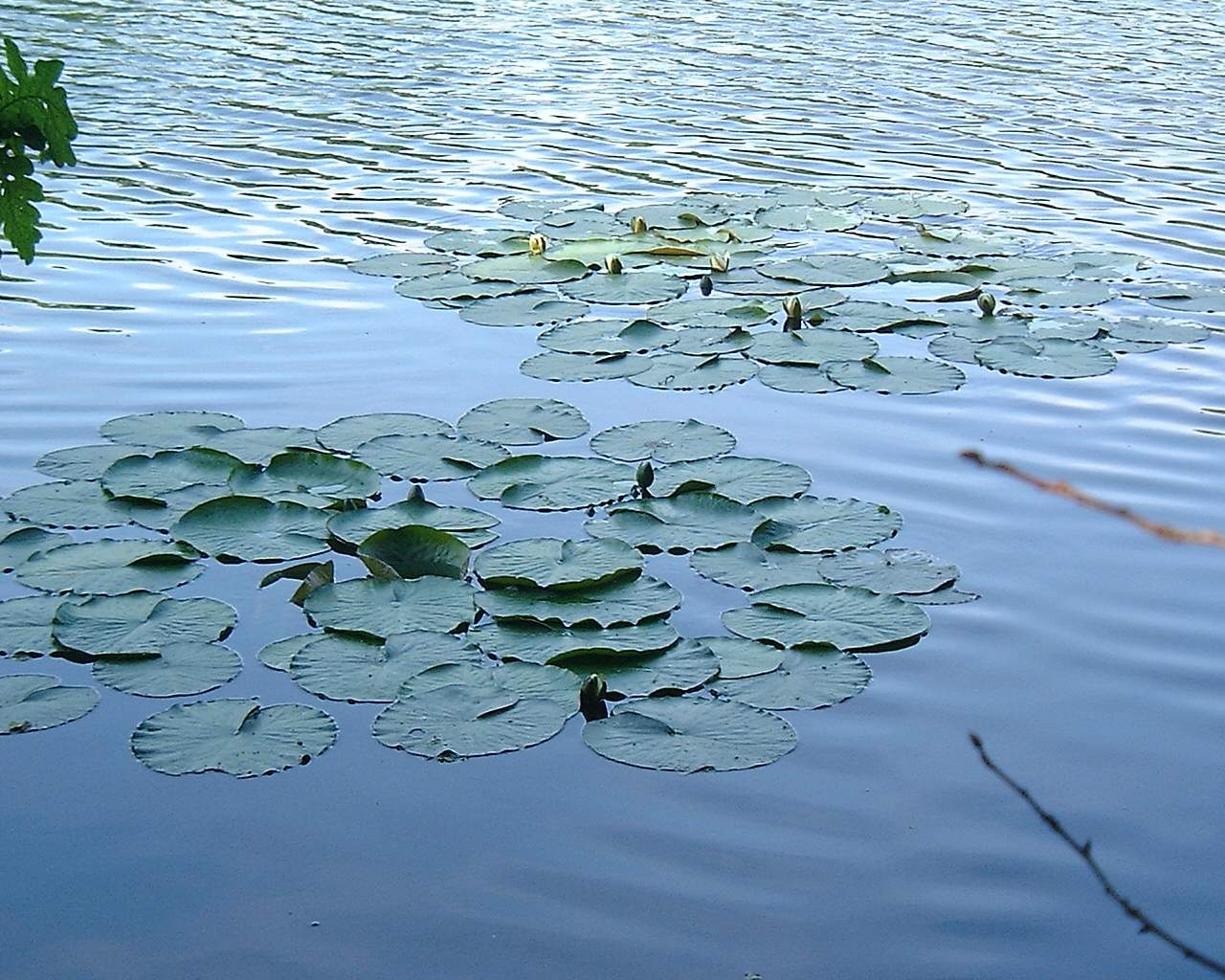
Water lilies

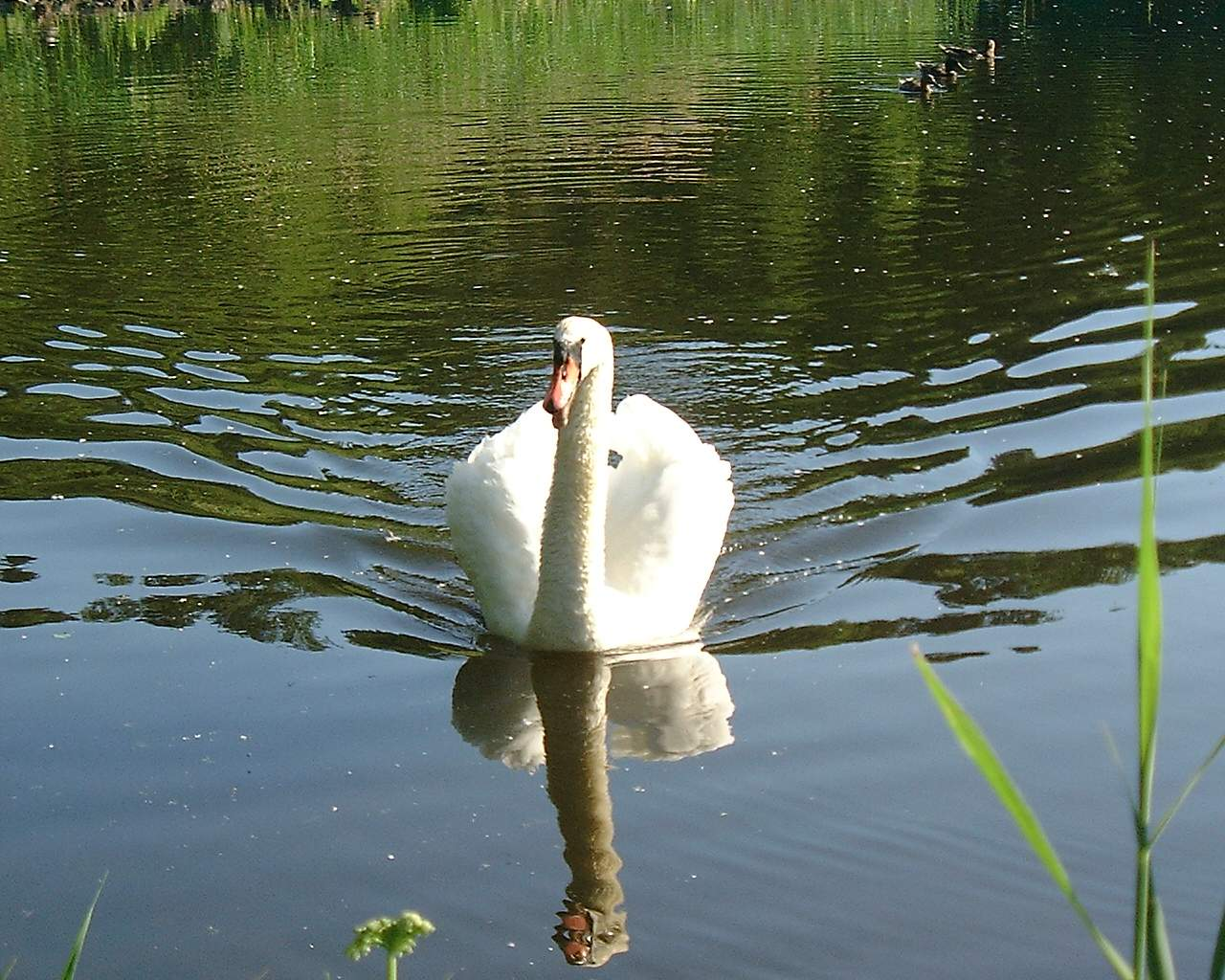
A swan

Presence of phytoplankton is low in August with exceptional blue green algae, green algae, and golden algae. Occurrence of zooplankton is more varied with several species of rotifers, cladocerans, and copepods. Among the aquatic plants in the lake fennel pondweed is notable as it normally only occurs in sea bays. Other aquatic plants and nymphoides include rigid hornwort, broad-leaved pondweed, perfoliate pondweed, water-starwort, Nymphaea alba, Lemna, and Chara tomentosa (for which the lake is, together with Kyrksjön, the only locale in Stockholm).

The sparse fauna before the dredging of the lake, after 1995 evolved into a pretty considerable variety of species typical for shallow lakes rich in nutrients. Two species of freshwater snails, Bithynia leachii and Gyraulus crista, were earlier considered as endangered. Noteworthy is also the population of several freshwater mussels, duck mussel and swan mussel, and Hippeutis complanatus, the latter two declining. A species of Oligochaeta new in Sweden has been reported in the lake just like did the rare hairy dragonfly. An inventory of dragonfly larvae in 2000 unveiled several other species (mostly red-eyed damselfly but also common blue damselfly, azure damselfly, variable damselfly, and northern damselfly (Coenagrion hastulatum). Fish population reflects the shortage of oxygen with an absence of carp bream and silver bream and an abundance of perch, roach, and crucian carp dating back to before the dredging. The outlet forms a threshold for migrating species.

Mallard and great crested grebe are breeding in the lake, just like are occasionally common moorhen and Canada goose (introduced in Sweden in the 1930s). Marsh warbler and gray heron are often seen among the reed. Even though reed have been cleared to attract waders, as a locale for birs, the lake hasn't met expectations much due to neglected attention of the canals and islands. There are three species of protected frogs in the lake: common frog, common toad, and smooth newt. The deer once abundant in the area have been superseded by roe deer.

== Visiting ==
The lake and the national city park are easily accessible by bus, metro, bicycle, or by foot. Nearest metro station is Universitetet. Each year the relay race Convinistafetten is held around Laduviken.

== See also ==
- Geography of Stockholm
- Lakes in Sweden
