= Isbladskärret =

Lake in central Stockholm, Sweden

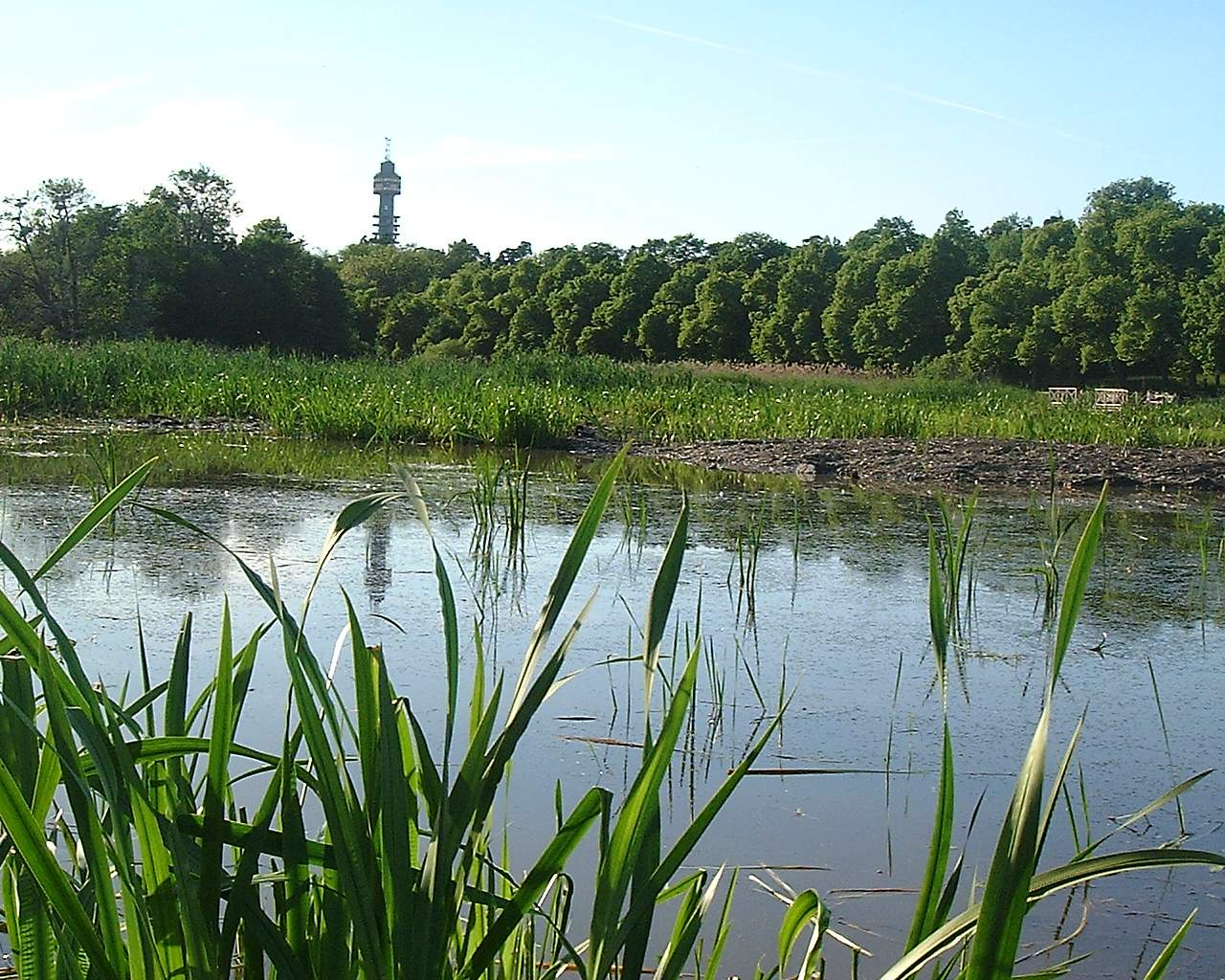
- The lake, with the Kaknäs Tower in the background

- Location within Stockholm
- Coordinates: 59°19′36″N 18°8′36″E
- Catchment area: 20 ha (49 acres)
- Basin countries: Sweden
- Surface area: 3.7 ha (9.1 acres)
- Average depth: < 1 m (3 ft 3 in)
- Settlements: Djurgården

Isbladskärret is a small lake on Djurgården, an island in central Stockholm, Sweden. The lake is much appreciated among bird-watchers, and, being part of the Royal National City Park, also carefully monitored by several organizations, including the World Wide Fund for Nature. The lake is one of six in Djurgården (including Northern Djurgården, north of the island), the others being Lillsjön, Uggleviken, Spegeldammen, Lappkärret, and Laduviken.

== Origin of the name ==
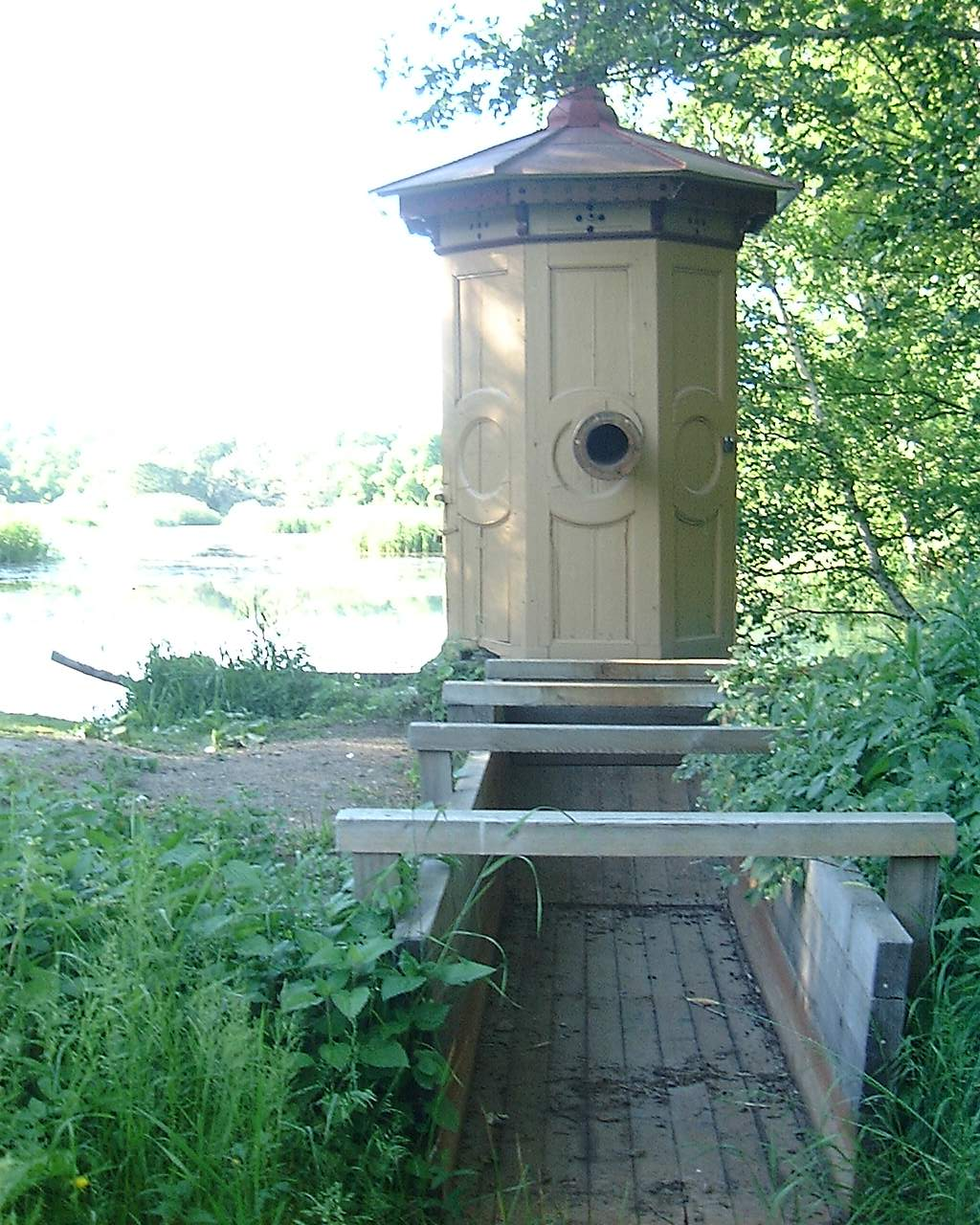
Old pump on the southern approach to the lake.

The name is derived from a small hunter's lodge located near the present lake. In historical records documenting fishing grounds on Djurgården during the 17th century, the lodge is unintelligibly called Isbla. The same lodge also gave name to a bay, Isbladsviken. Most Stockholmer's today are likely to interpret the name as Is-blads-kärret ("The Ice Leaf Marsh").

== History ==
The area was originally a marsh separating the northern and southern parts of Djurgården until the 1830s when the canal Djurgårdsbrunnskanalen was built. By the turn of the century 1900, Prince Carl (1861–1951) settle at Parkudden nearby and had the swamp drained. The surrounding area was then used for agriculture until the 1950s, but the pumping-station remained in use until the Royal Djurgården Administration decided to develop the area in 1981 to attracts birds and plant life and closed to pump. Within a year sea birds had found the lake and more than 70 species have been spotted by the lake since, as a sign in the northern end of the lake knowns to tell. Footpaths and outlooks have been created around the lake since.

== Birds ==
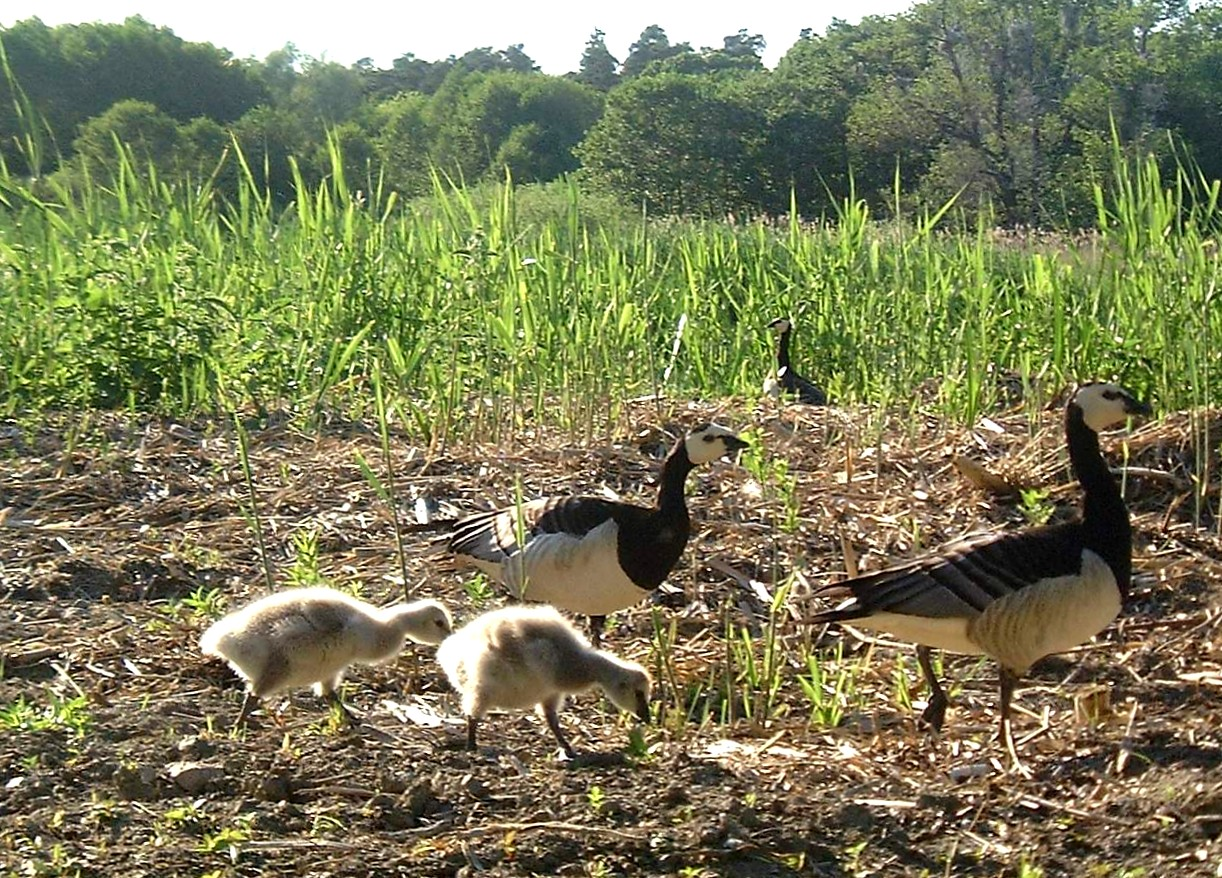
A family of barnacle geese.

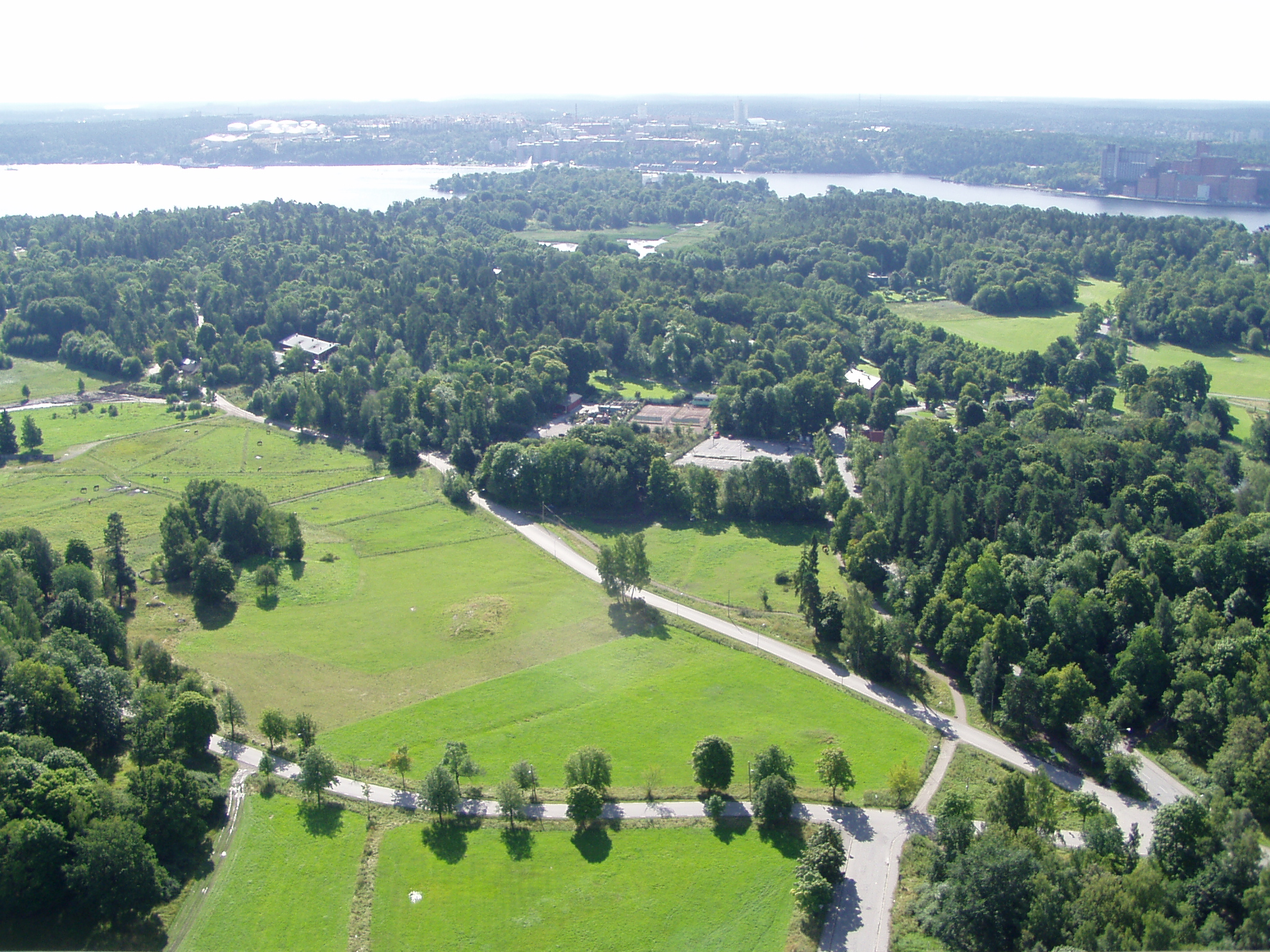
View from Kaknästornet, Isbladskärret is in the center background.

The large number of bird species have made the lake and the surrounding area popular among Stockholmers and tourists alike. The lake area is mostly famous for its colony of more than 100 herons (all originating from birds that once escaped from the zoo at Skansen), but the surrounding walks in the forests are also known for the tawny owl found there.

Bird species with an annual presences by the lake include: Great crested grebe, Slavonian grebe, black-headed gull, tufted duck, gadwall, northern shoveler, wigeon, Eurasian coot, common moorhen, common goldeneye, Ardea, greylag goose, Canada goose, barnacle goose, wood warbler, European pied flycatcher, thrush nightingale, Eurasian nuthatch, common treecreeper, European robin, hawfinch, willow warblers, whitethroat, common chaffinch, blue tit, European goldfinch, great spotted woodpecker, dunlin, greenshank, northern lapwing, ruff, and European green woodpecker. Less common are icterine warbler, marsh warbler, sedge warbler, Eurasian wren, and lesser spotted woodpecker.

== See also ==
- Geography of Stockholm
- Lakes of Sweden
- Royal National City Park
