= Lillsjön, Djurgården =

Lake in Stockholm Municipality, Sweden

Coordinates: 59.362°N 18.085°E

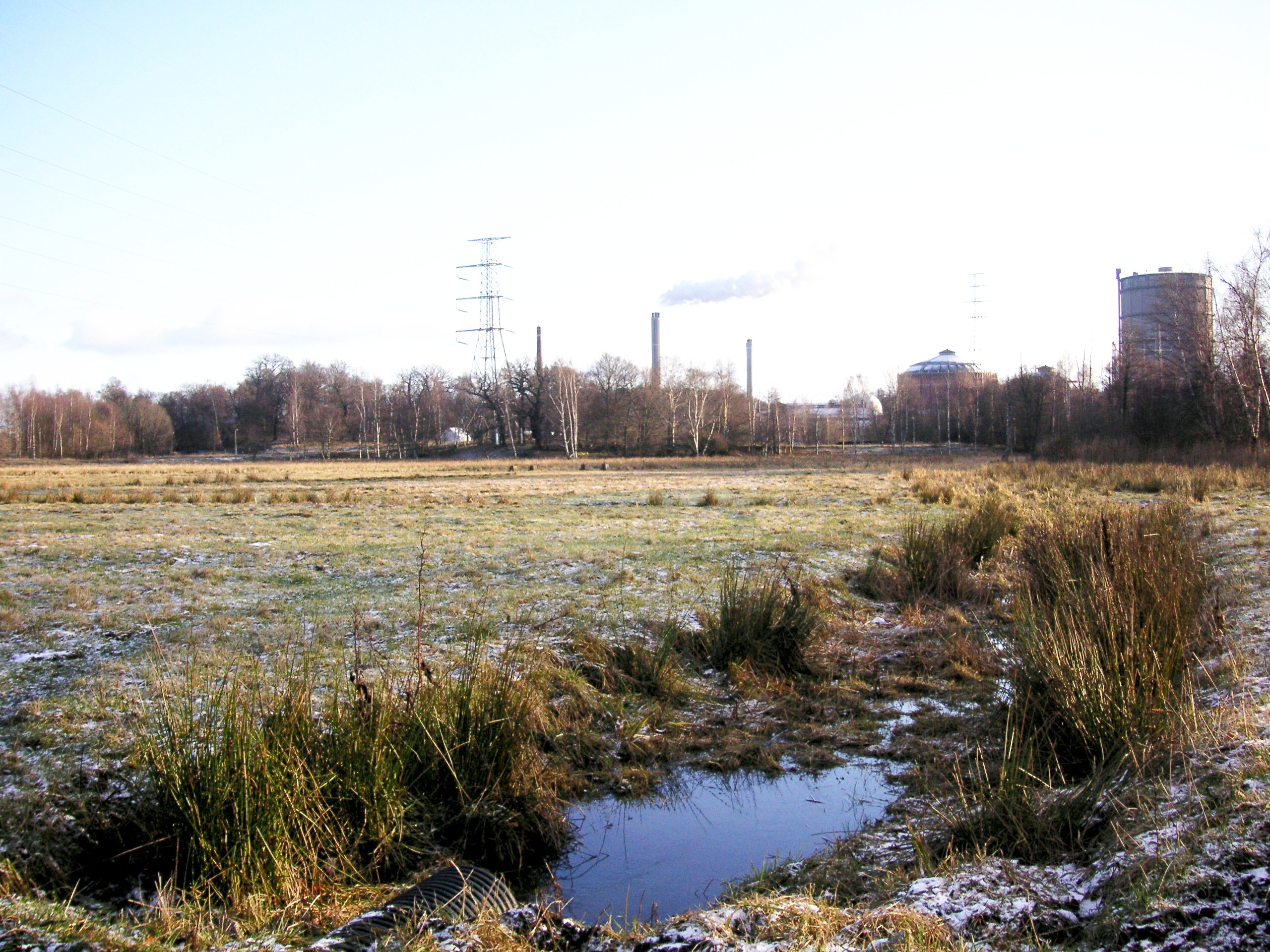
Remains of Lillsjön in November 2007.

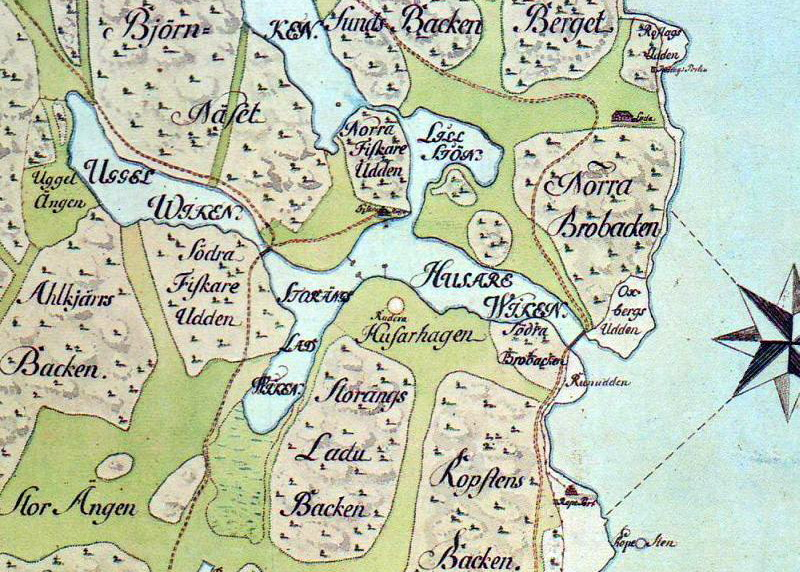
Historical map showing the area in the 17th century. Lillsjön is on top centre.

Lillsjön (Swedish: Small Lake) is a small, former lake in Norra Djurgården, a semi-rural area in north-eastern central Stockholm, Sweden, forming part of the Royal National City Park. Today transformed into a wetland, it is often mentioned as one of the six lakes in the area, the other being: Laduviken, Uggleviken, Isbladskärret, Lappkärret, and Spegeldammen.

Lillsjön used to be connected to other lakes in the area through narrow straits. Through a project sponsored by the World Wide Fund for Nature, water was pumped into the small basin reinforced by new embankments. Reed was also burnt away, and the former lake thus transformed into a shore meadow attracting many birds, starting with northern lapwings in March, followed by common snipes later in spring. In autumn, many birds rest here on their way south, such as wood sandpipers, common redshanks, greenshanks, and ruffs.

A striking feature at Lillsjön are the Highland cattle residing there from May to October. Not only do they attract many Stockholmers of all ages, they also affect the local fauna as they eat reed and tufted hair-grass, thus preventing these species from taking over the area – and thereby allowing space to flowers such as cowslips and bitter vetch, as well as birds and insects attracted by water.

== See also ==
- Geography of Stockholm
- Lakes in Sweden
