= Blockhusudden =

Eastern tip of Djurgården island, Stockholm

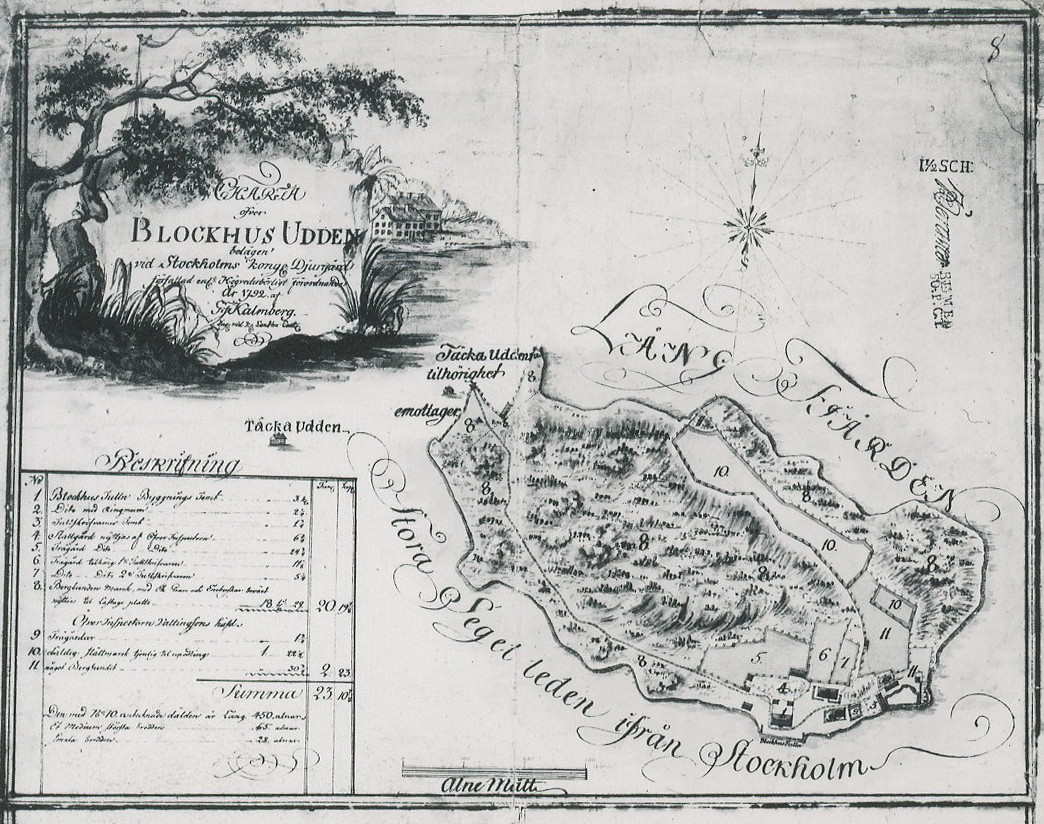
Blockhusudden in 1792

Blockhusudden is the eastern tip of the island of Djurgården in Stockholm, Sweden. This place takes its name from "blockhus" meaning a strong, fortification, and "udden" meaning the point, the cape. Blockhusudden is bordered to the north and east by Lilla Värtan. On the south side, the Stockholm channel passes. There are eight airports near Blockhusudden.

== History ==
The customs post was the only building in Blockhusudden until the beginning of the 19th century. One of the first inhabitants was J. C. Middendorff, who had a large piece of land in 1806. He built a modest dwelling there. On the heights of Blockhusudden was installed Ernest Thiel, a banker and art collector who built in 1905 Villa Eolskulle more known as the Thiel Gallery designed by the architect Ferdinand Boberg.

This island has always had strategic importance. Its positioning makes it a mandatory point of entry to Stockholm for all ships arriving from the Baltic. The Eolslund Villa was the site of an alarm to warn Stockholm residents of impending danger. Similar alarm lights were installed in Kungshatt, Brunkeberg, and Björkö.

Thiel Gallery is an art museum located at Blockhusudden in the royal park of Djurgården.

The eastern part of Blockhusudden is called Plommonbacken and has many country houses built in the 18th and 19th centuries. On the promontory, there is a café with views of Nacka. A lighthouse was installed in the middle of the Stockholm Channel in 1905. But in 1912 the lighthouse turned into AGA lighthouse by the invention of Gustaf Dalén.

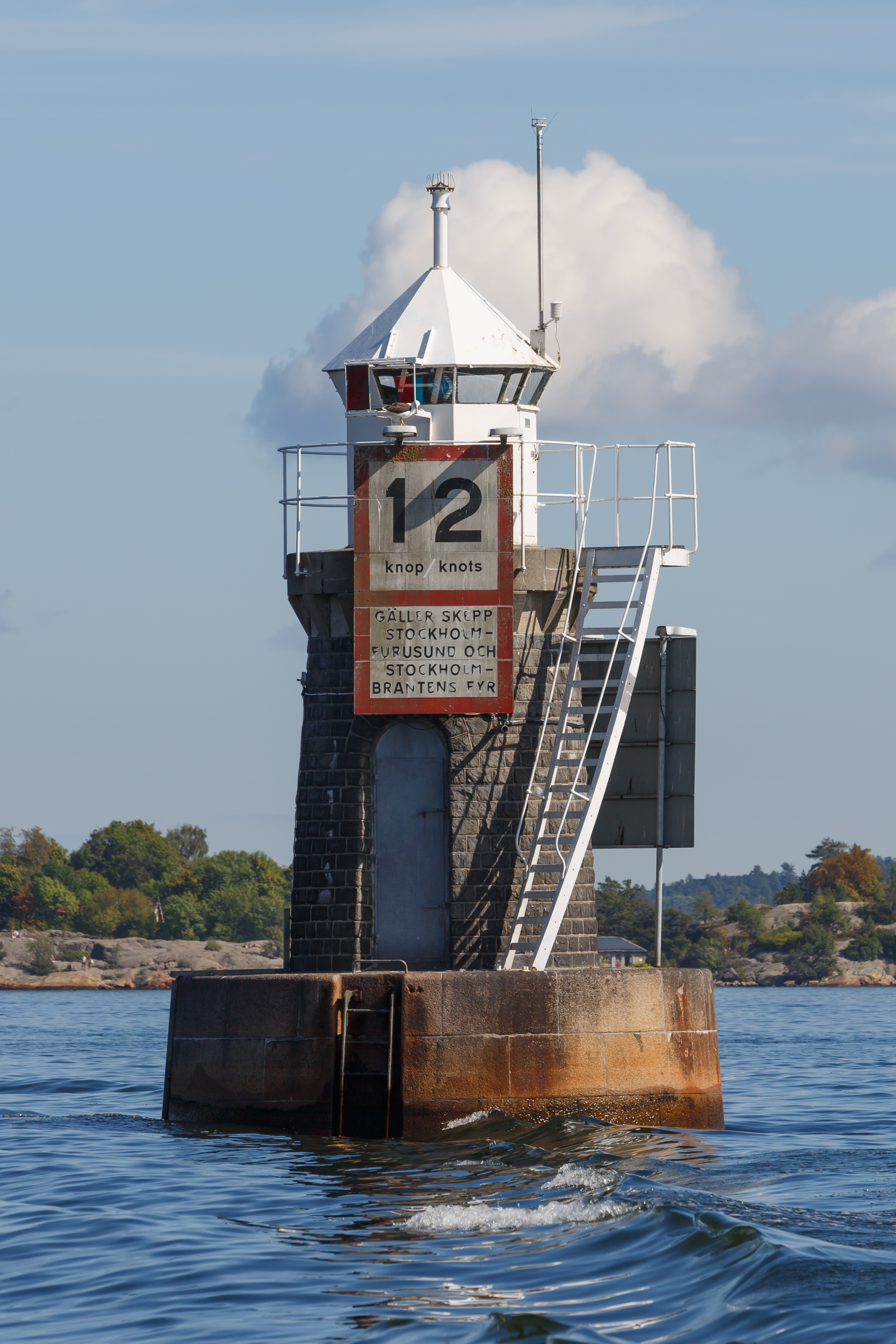
Stockholm Sweden Blockhusudden-lighthouse

== Gallery ==
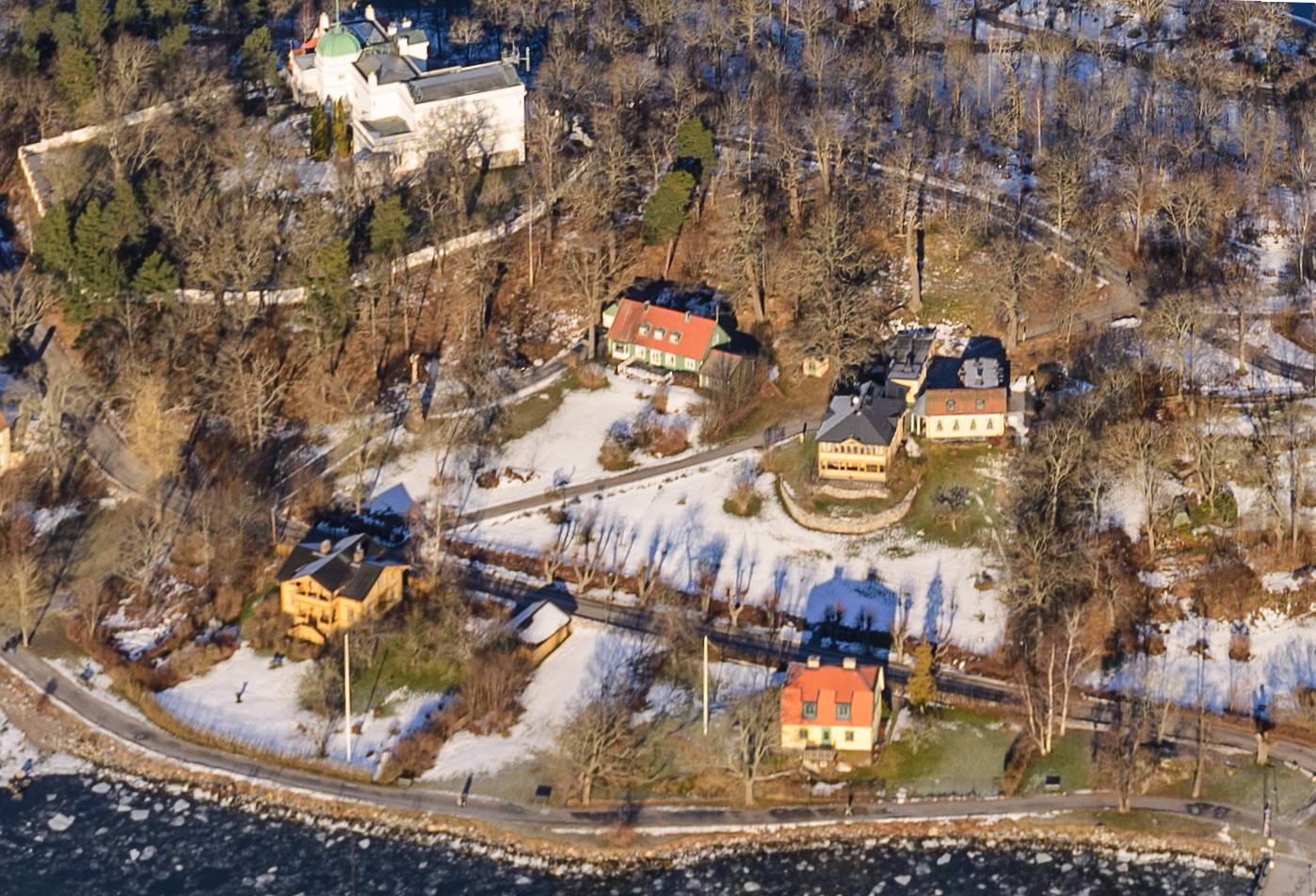
Blockhusudden, Eolskulle

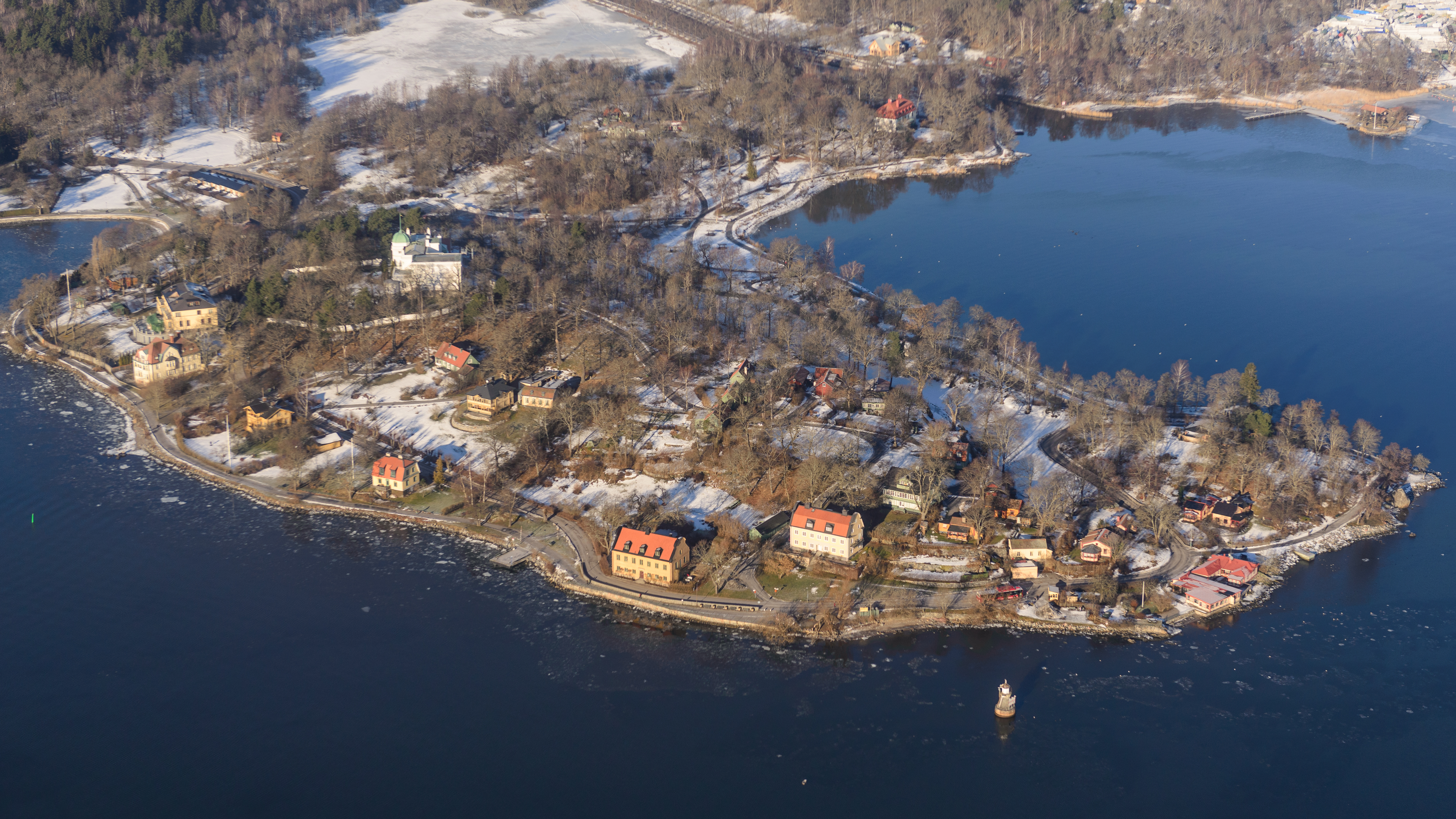
Blockhusudden February 2013

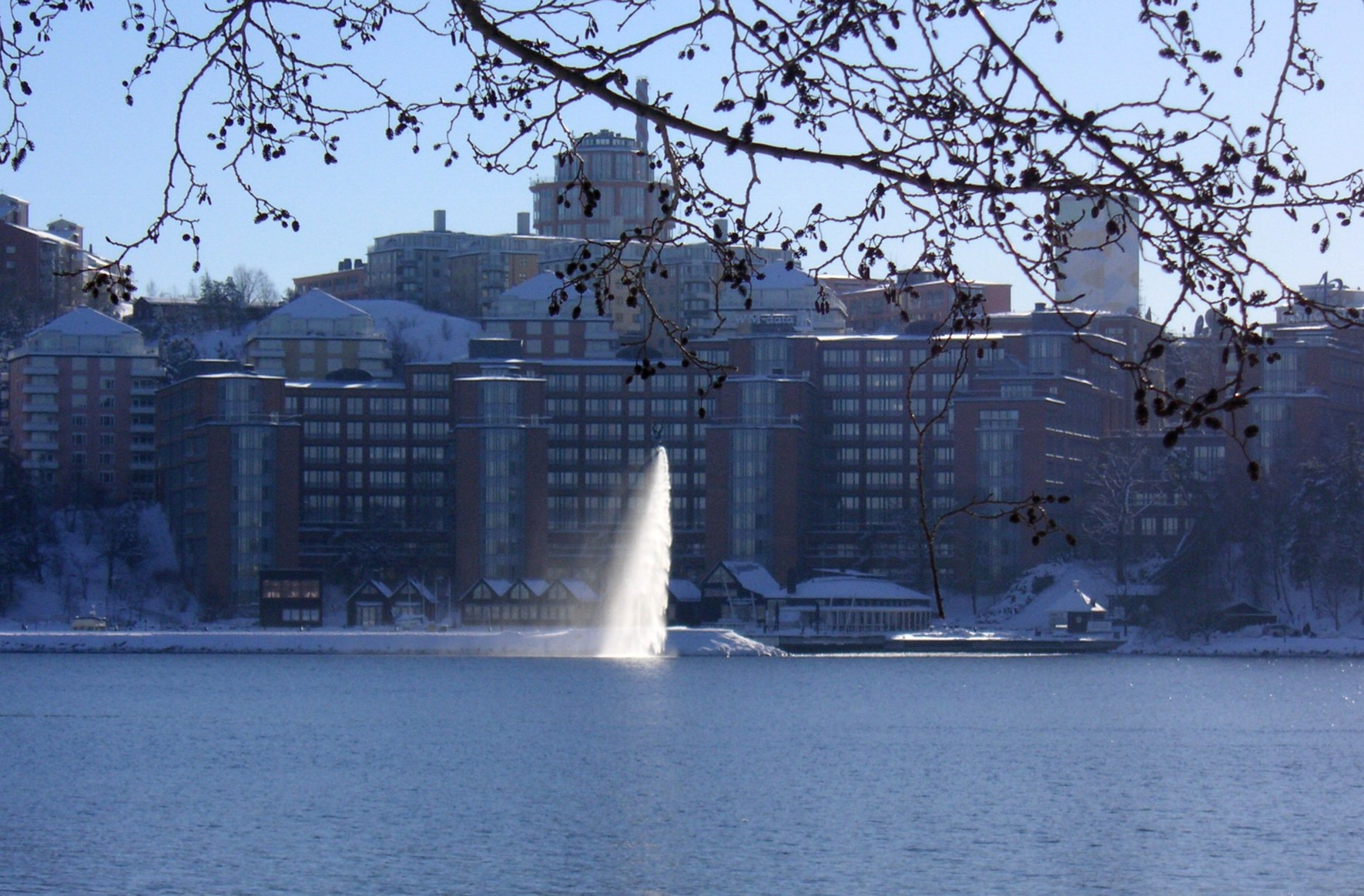
Blockhusudden 2006

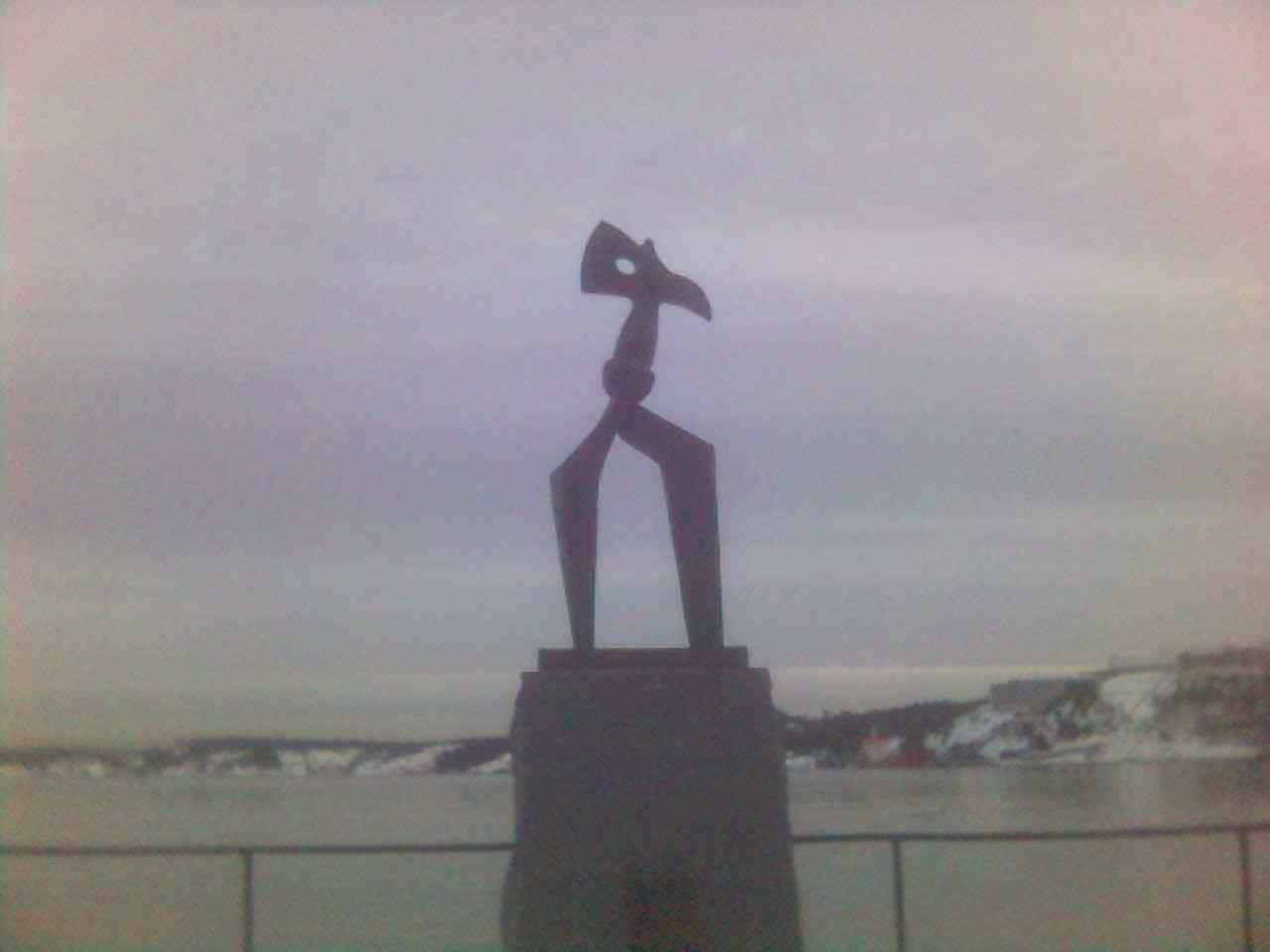

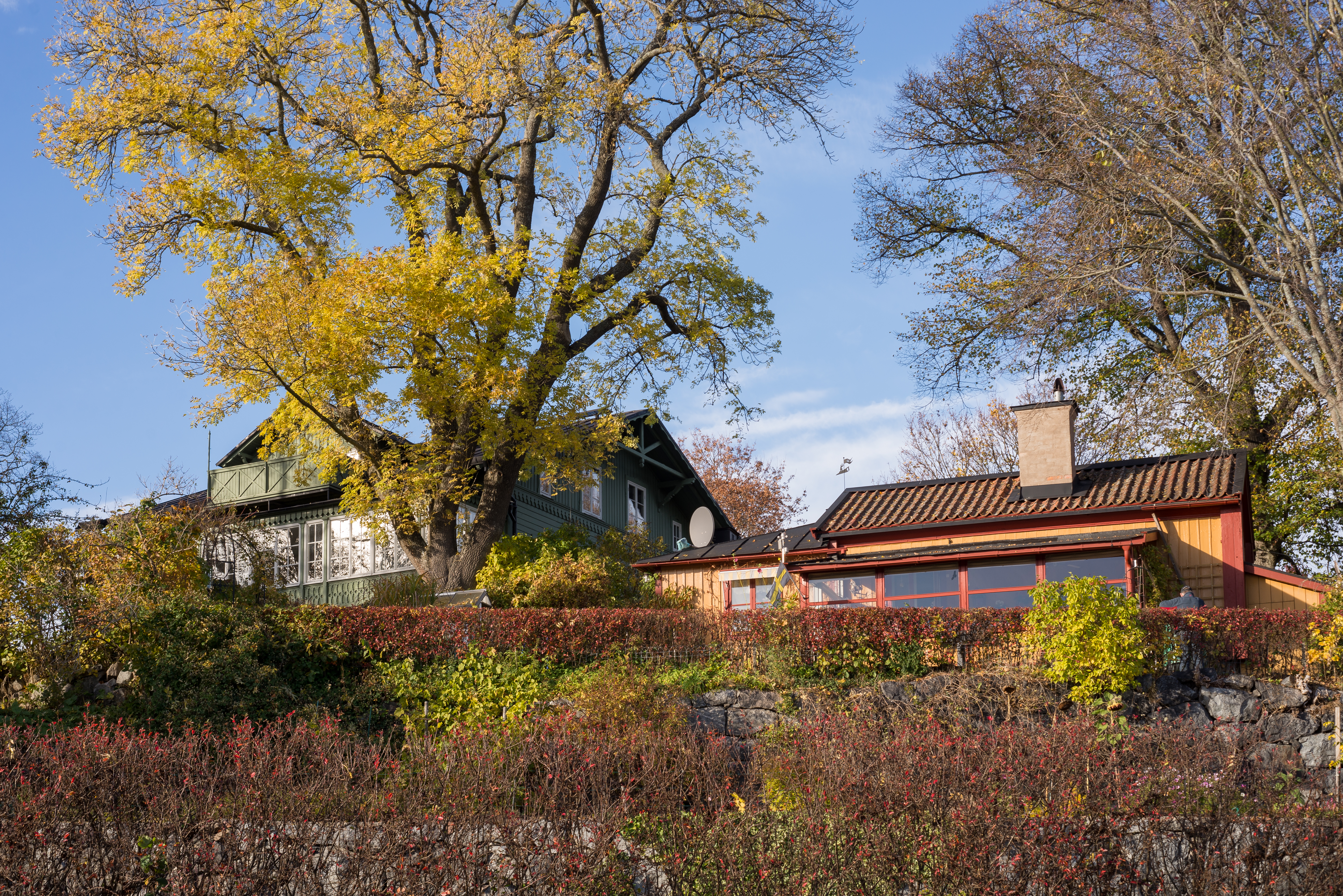
Blockhusudden October 2013

== See also ==
- Djurgården
- Nacka
- History of lighthouses
