= Vikingarännet =

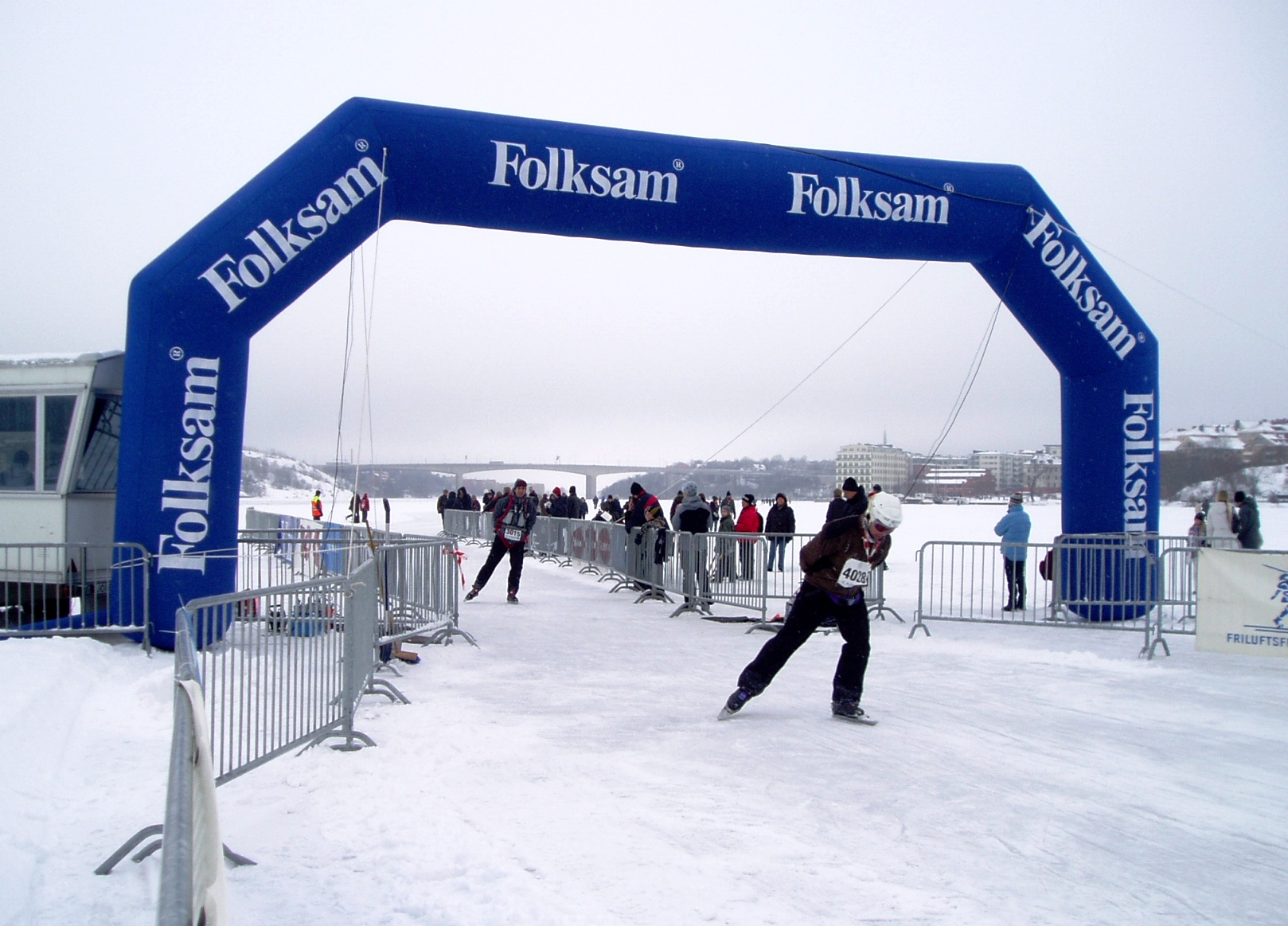
- Vikingarännet 2010 finishing line in Stockholm
- Status: active
- Genre: sports event
- Date: February
- Frequency: annual
- Location: Sweden
- Inaugurated: 1999
- Organiser: Swedish Skating Association; Outdoor Association

Vikingarännet (Swedish for 'The Viking Run') is a long distance ice skating race and tour skating event between Uppsala and Stockholm in Sweden. The race length is about 80km. There is also a shorter 50km event called Vikingaturen ('The Viking Tour').

== Name ==
The event is named after the Viking Age (ca. 1000 CE) because it follows historical water transportation routes on Lake Mälaren which have been used since then.

== History ==
The first race was in 1999, when about 4000 skaters participated. The event had to be cancelled in 2000 and 2002 due to poor ice conditions on the planned race date, and again in 2008 due to nearly complete absence of ice all through the winter along the planned route. Beginning in 2003, the race date is only set a few weeks beforehand, depending on short term predictions of ice conditions.

Beginning in 2006 most of the 80km course, called Vikingaslingan, was kept ploughed for the entire three-month skating season, not just for the race event.

== List of winners ==
- 1999: Hotze Zandstra – Netherlands (2:35:42)
- 2000: race not held
- 2001: Martijn Kromkamp – Netherlands (2:58:10)
- 2002: race not held
- 2003: Johan Håmås – Sweden (3:09:00)
- 2004: Johan Håmås – Sweden (2:57:02
- 2005: Johan Håmås – Sweden (2:44:07)
- 2006: Johan Håmås – Sweden (2:45:08)
- 2007: Johan Håmås – Sweden (2:40:01)
- 2008: race not held
- 2009: Johan Håmås – Sweden (2:40:32)
- 2010: Sonny Peterson – Sweden (2:57:46)
- 2011: Matt X. Richardson – Sweden (2:51:57)
- 2012: Jan Maarten Heideman – Netherlands (3:02:35)
- 2013: Erben Wennemars – Netherlands (2:35:52)
- 2014: race not held
- 2015: race not held
- 2016: unknown
- 2017: race not held
- 2018: race not held

== See also ==
- List of sporting events in Sweden
