= Bellmanstafetten =

Relay race in Stockholm, Sweden

Bellmanstafetten, known under its sponsor name Convinistafetten, is a 5 × 5 km relay race on Djurgården in Stockholm. The course is around Laduviken in the Royal National City Park close to the Stockholm City Center. The race takes place on two days, Thursday and Saturday, and each team can choose which of the two days to run. In 2022 it was Sweden´s largest corporate event with 600 participating teams.
