= Lilla Värtan =

Strait in Stockholm, Sweden

Coordinates: 59°21′04″N 18°07′23″E

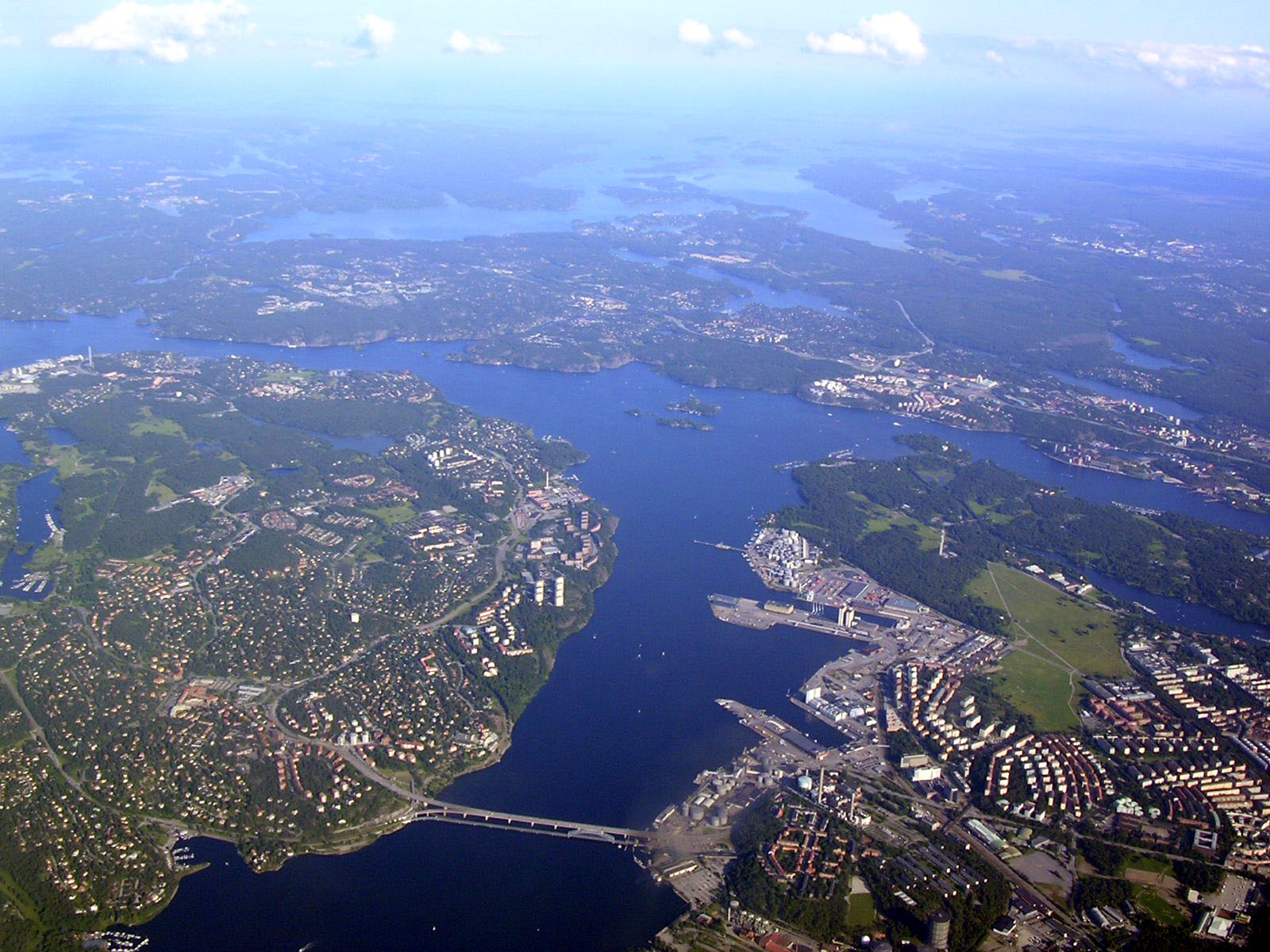
Aerial view of Lilla Värtan looking south. Lidingö in the left, Stockholm on the right, the bridge Lidingöbron in the foreground and Nacka in the background.

Lilla Värtan (Swedish: Smaller Värtan) or simply Värtan is a strait in Stockholm, Sweden. Separating mainland Stockholm from the island and municipality Lidingö, it stretches from Blockhusudden in the south to Stora Värtan in the north, and is joined by the Stocksundet mid-way. Two bridges, collectively called Lidingöbron ("Lidingö Bridge") stretch over the strait.

While most of the coasts surrounding the strait are occupied by industries and the ferry terminals and oil tanks in the harbour area of Värtahamnen, natural beaches are found in both the southern and the northern end of the strait and the strait forms part of the Royal National City Park.

Most common fish species are Baltic herring, sea trout, and salmon. Stationary predator fishes, e.g. northern pike and perch, are exposed to raised levels of mercury.

The area is considered an important wintering location for several birds species, including swans, Eurasian coot, common pochard, tufted duck, black-headed gull, lesser black-backed gull, gadwall, and common tern. The strait constitutes an important locale, especially ice-free winters, besides the lake Isbladskärret on Djurgården.

Vegetation on the shore lines of Lilla Värtan includes alder, purple loosestrife, common valerian, yellow loosestrife, reed canary-grass, tall fescue, lesser periwinkle, and giant knotweed.

Levels of heavy metals and organic waste are high in the bottom silt and nutrient levels high in the water. The level of phosphorus was 29 μg/L in 2005.

== See also ==
- Geography of Stockholm
- Stora Värtan
