= Royal National City Park =

Park in Stockholm, Sweden

- Swedish: Kungliga nationalstadsparken
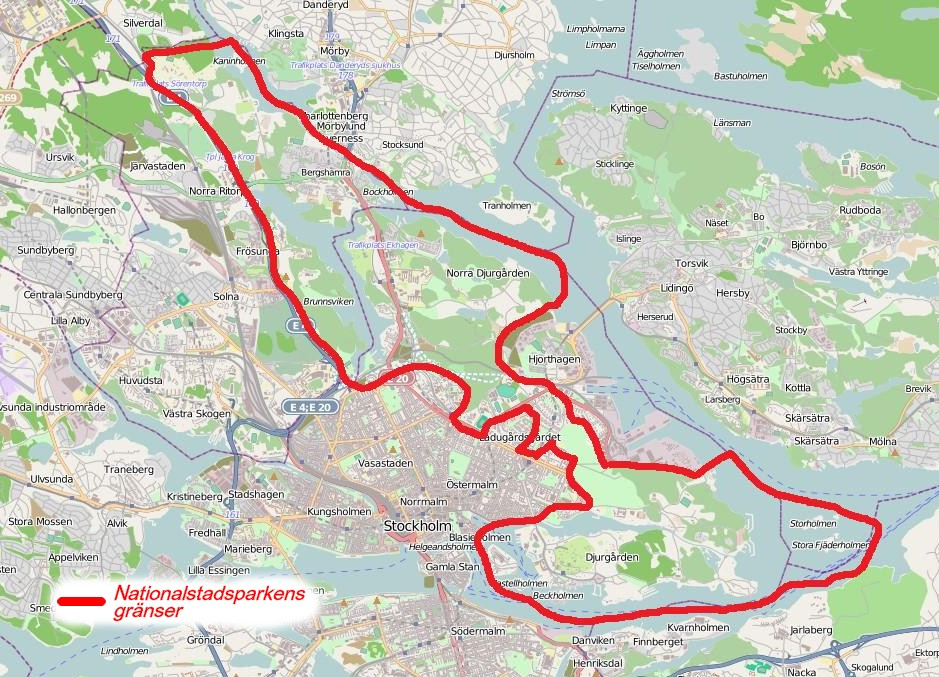
- Royal National City Park (2010) on OpenStreetMap
- Location: Stockholm, Solna and Lidingö
- Coordinates: 59°21′42″N 18°04′25″E
- Created: 1995

The Royal National City Park (Swedish: Kungliga nationalstadsparken) is a national urban park, established by the Swedish Parliament in 1994, and located in the municipalities of Stockholm, Solna and Lidingö in Sweden.

| Municipality | Land area¹ | Lake area¹ | Sea area¹ | Total area¹ | Population | Density² |
|---|---|---|---|---|---|---|
| Stockholm | 13.04 | 0.13 | 4.34 | 17.51 | 14,215 | 811.82 |
| Solna | 5.81 | 0 | 1.69 | 7.50 | 7,550 | 1006.67 |
| Lidingö | 0.12 | 0 | 1.25 | 1.38 | 3 | 2.19 |
| Total | 18.97 | 0.13 | 7.28 | 26.39 | 21,768 | 825.17 |

1/ km²
2/ Population per km²

== Gallery ==
Some places in the Royal National City Park:

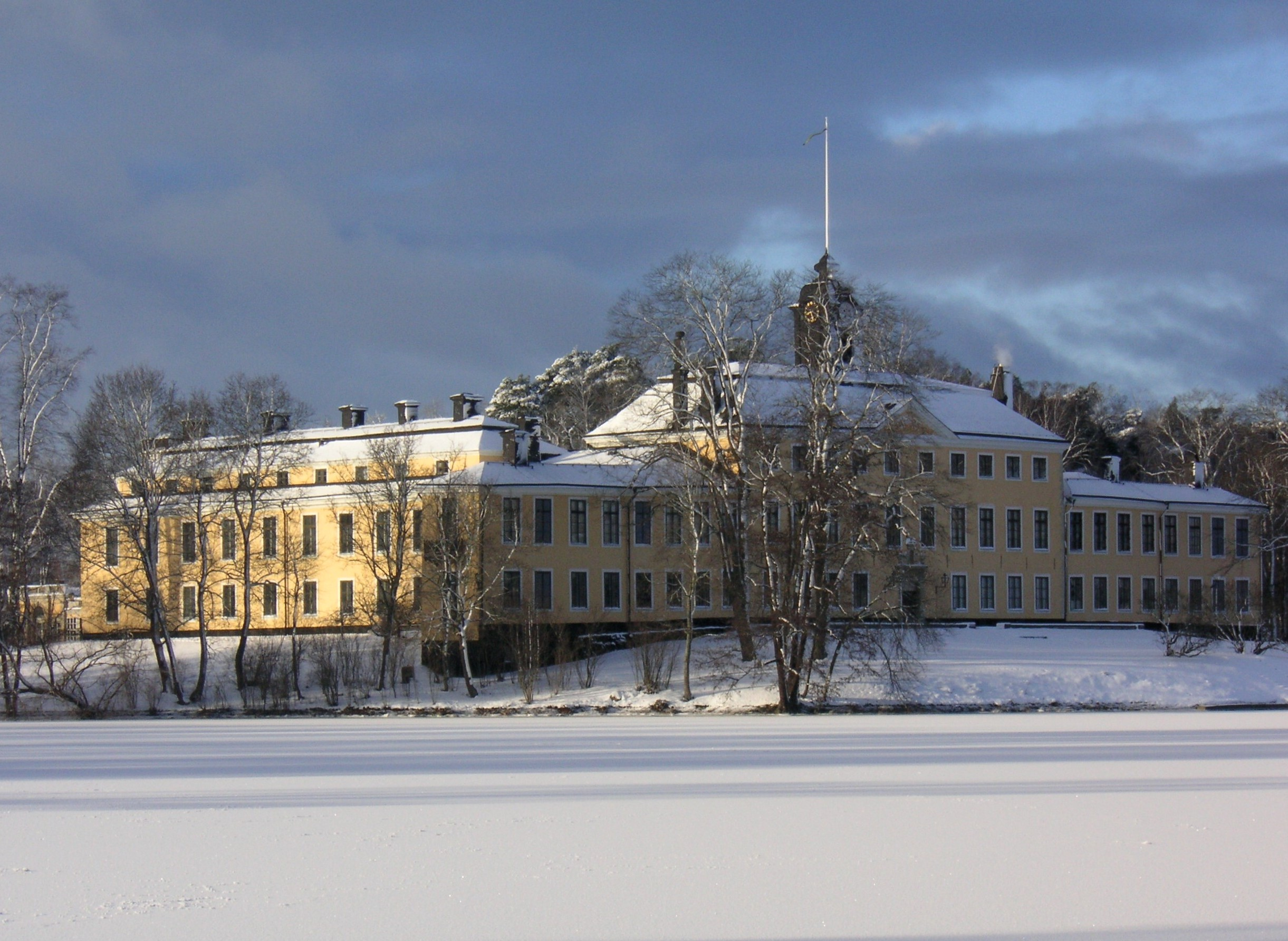
Ulriksdal Palace from Edsviken

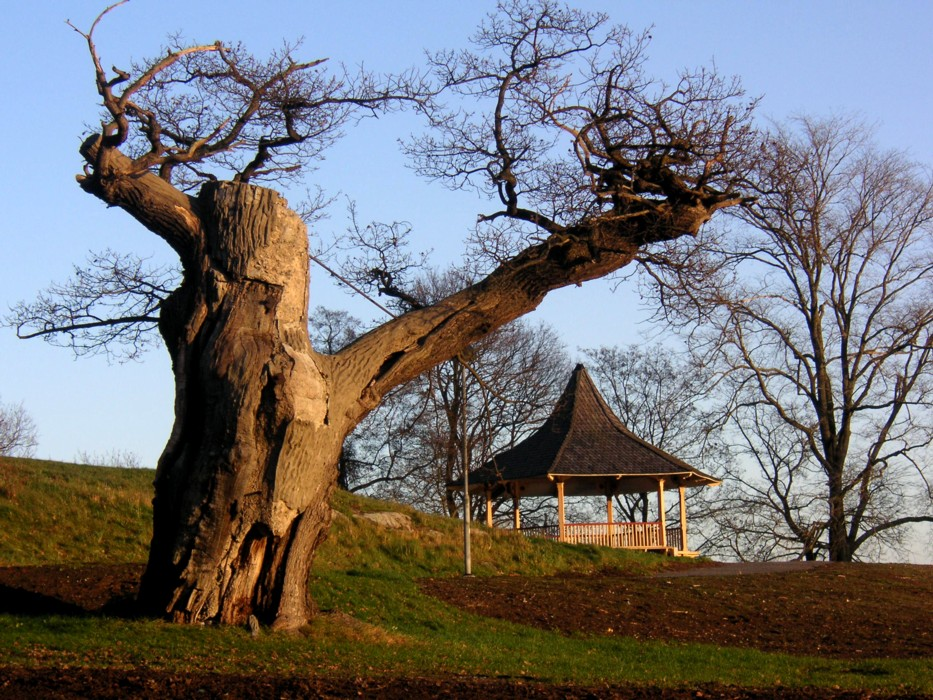
Old oaktree in Djurgården

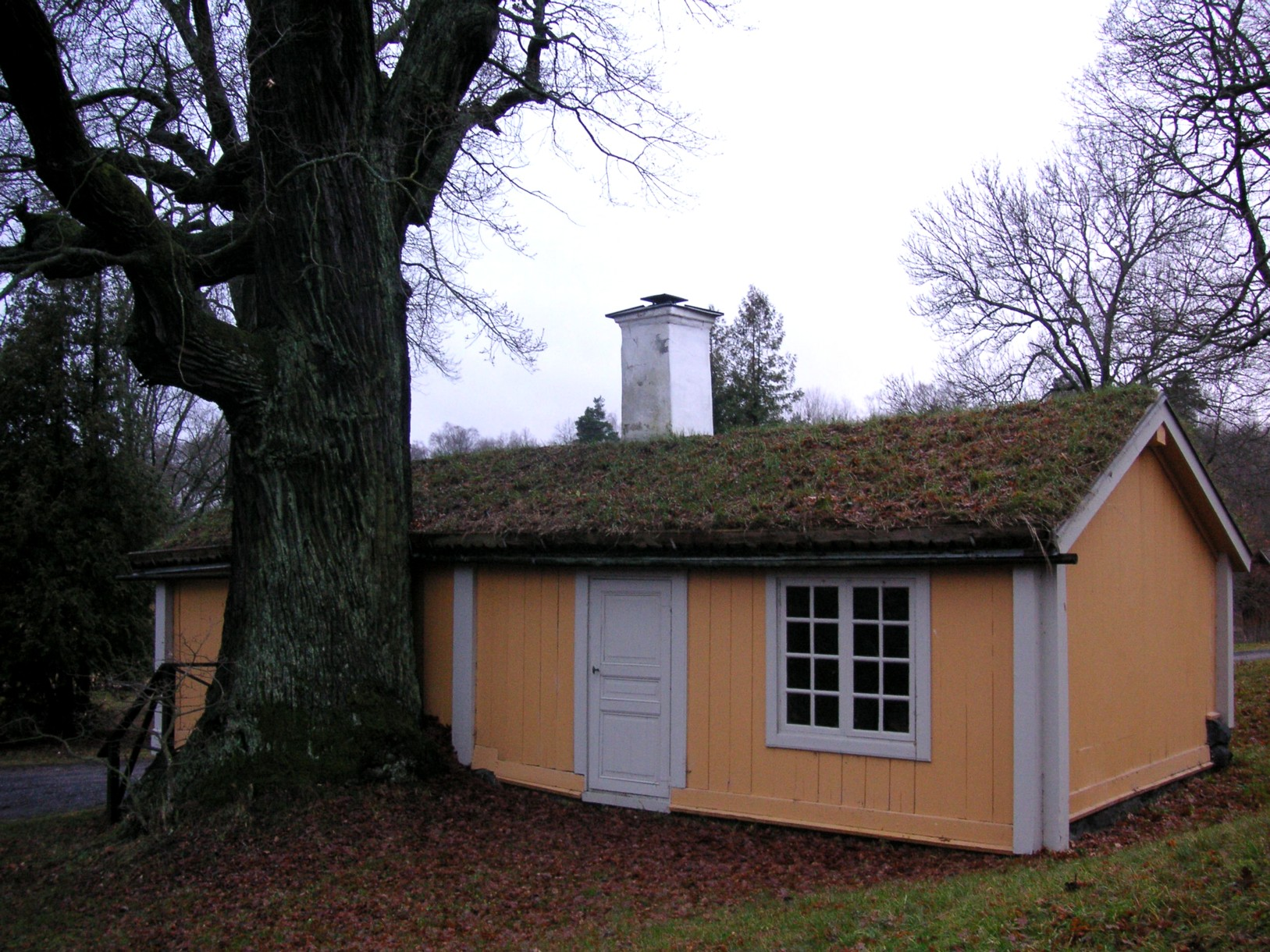
Charles XI's fishing cottage

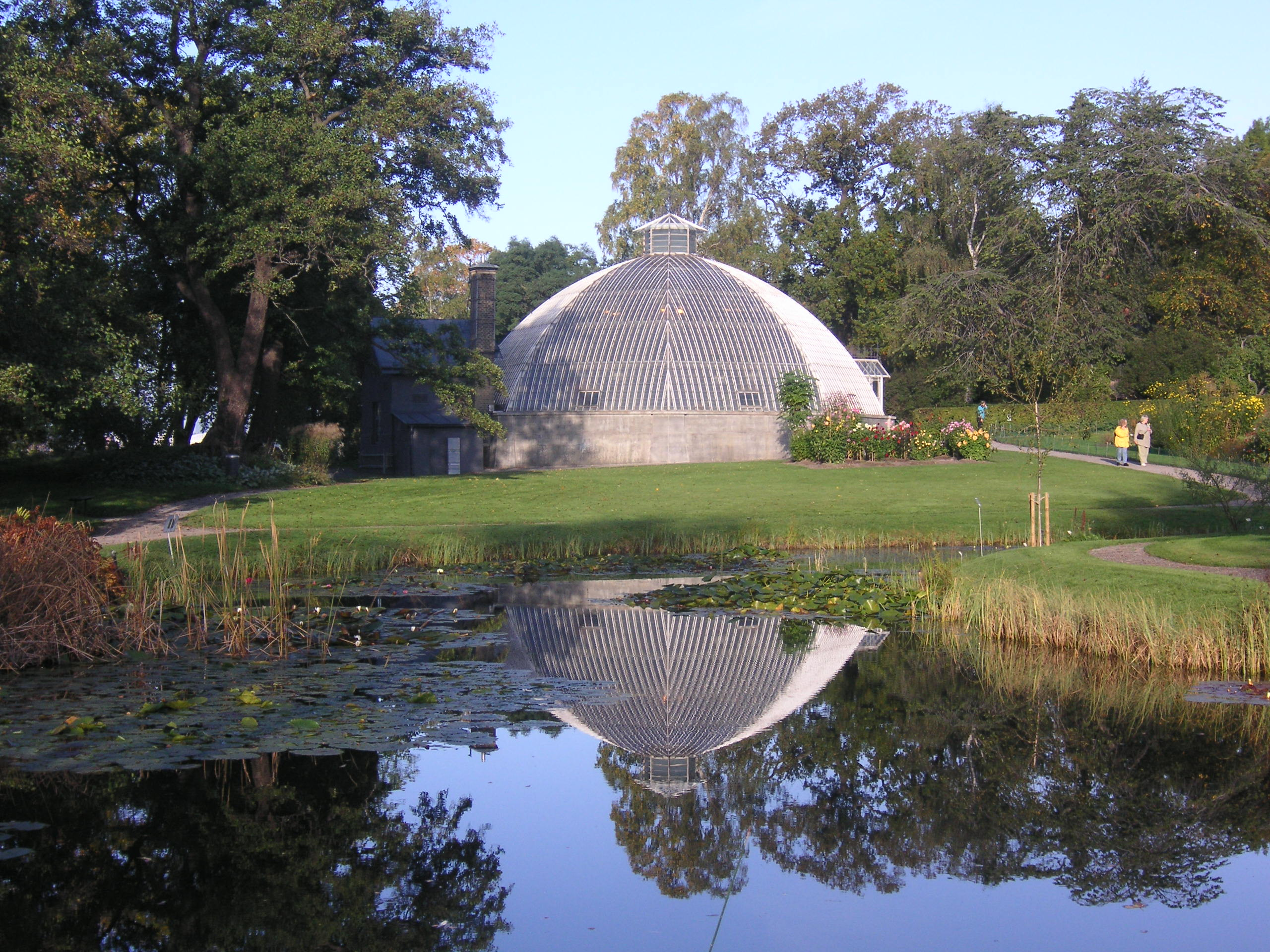
Bergian Garden

== See also ==
- Green belt
