= Stockholm =

Capital and most populous city of Sweden

- Capital city
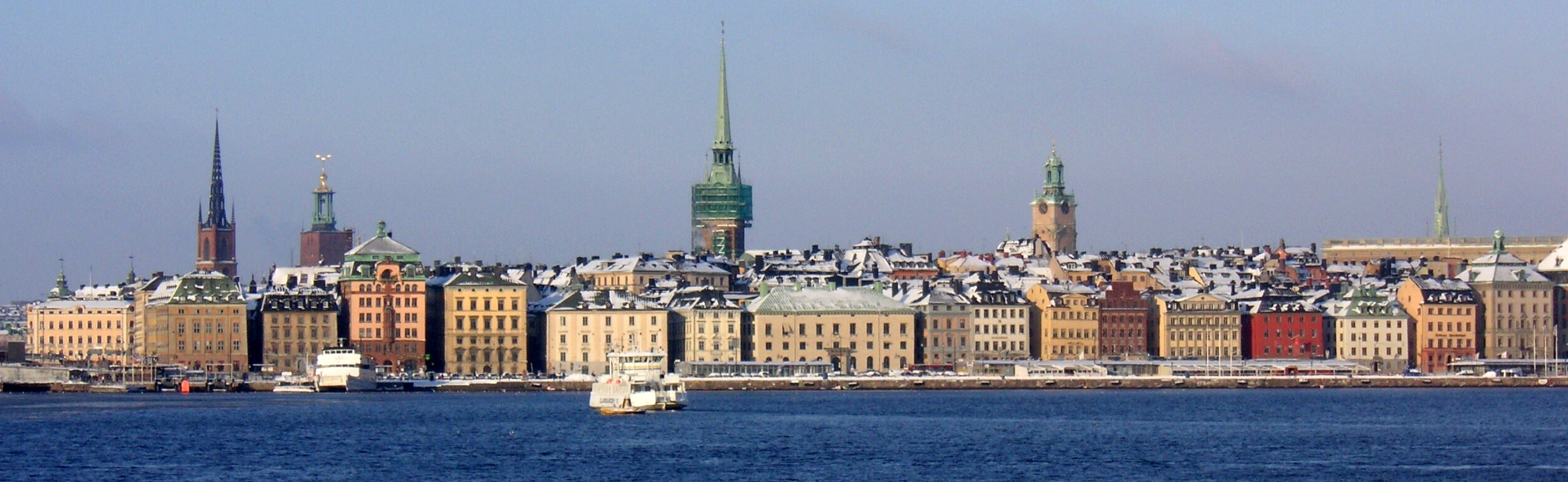
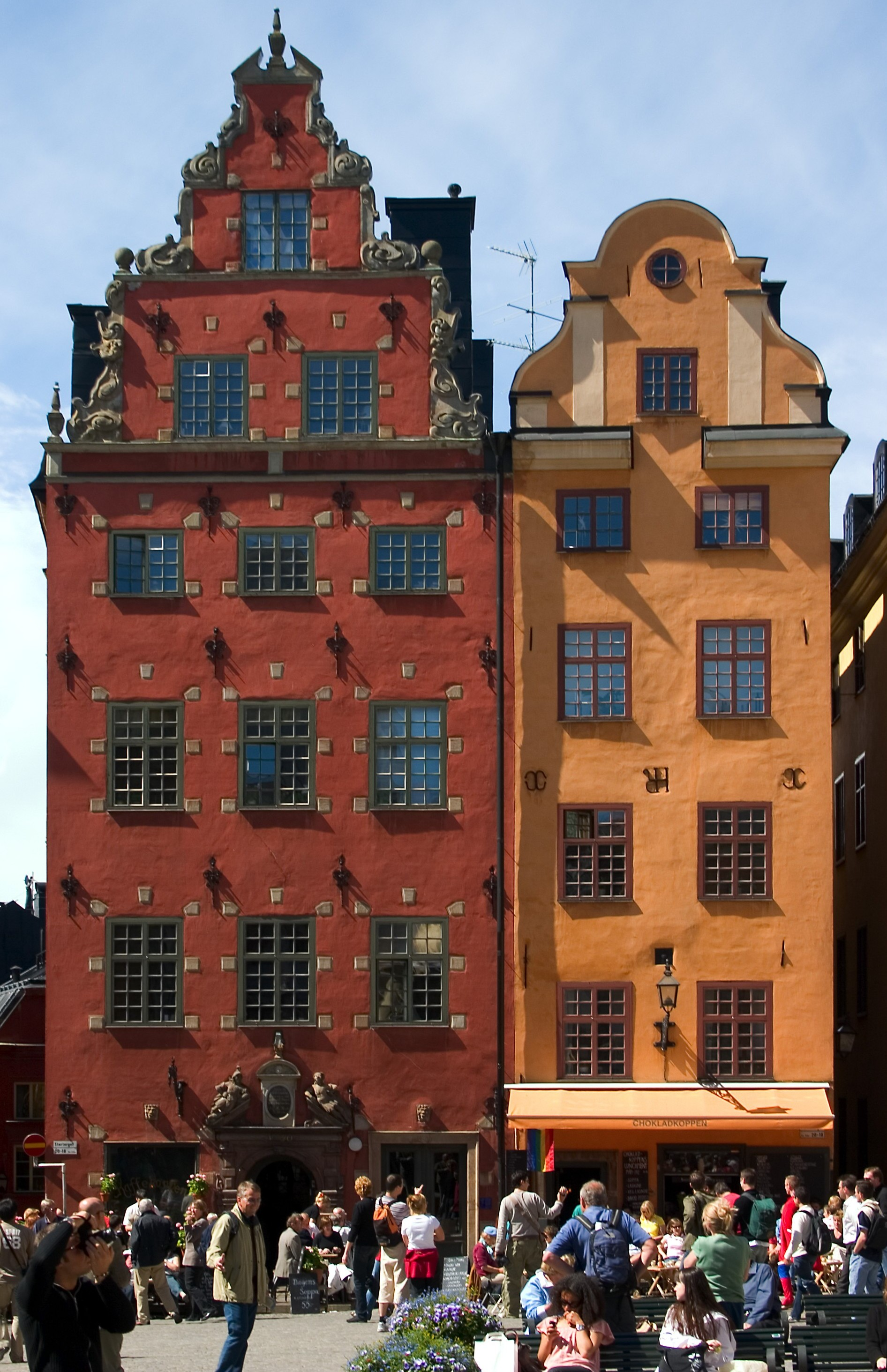
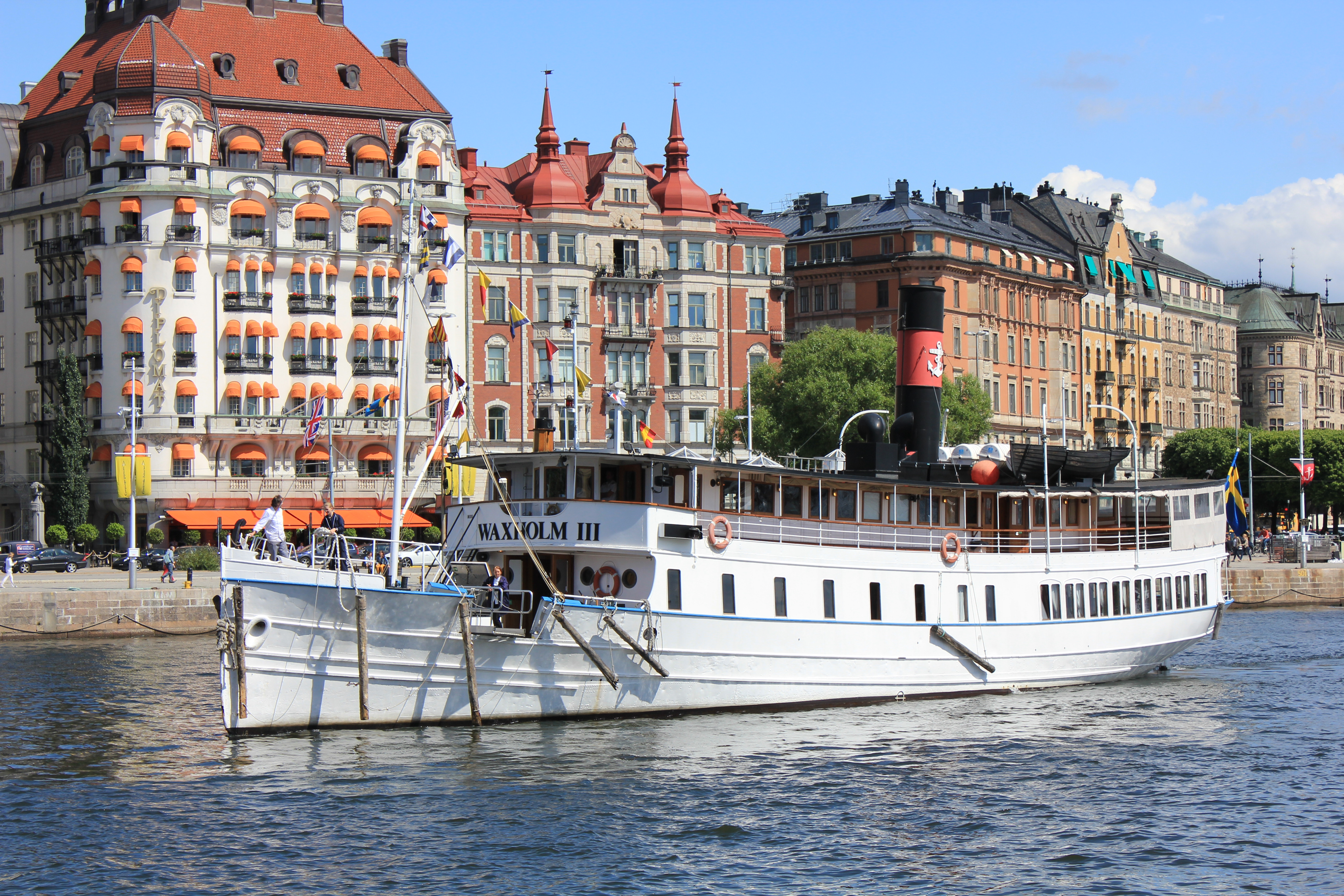
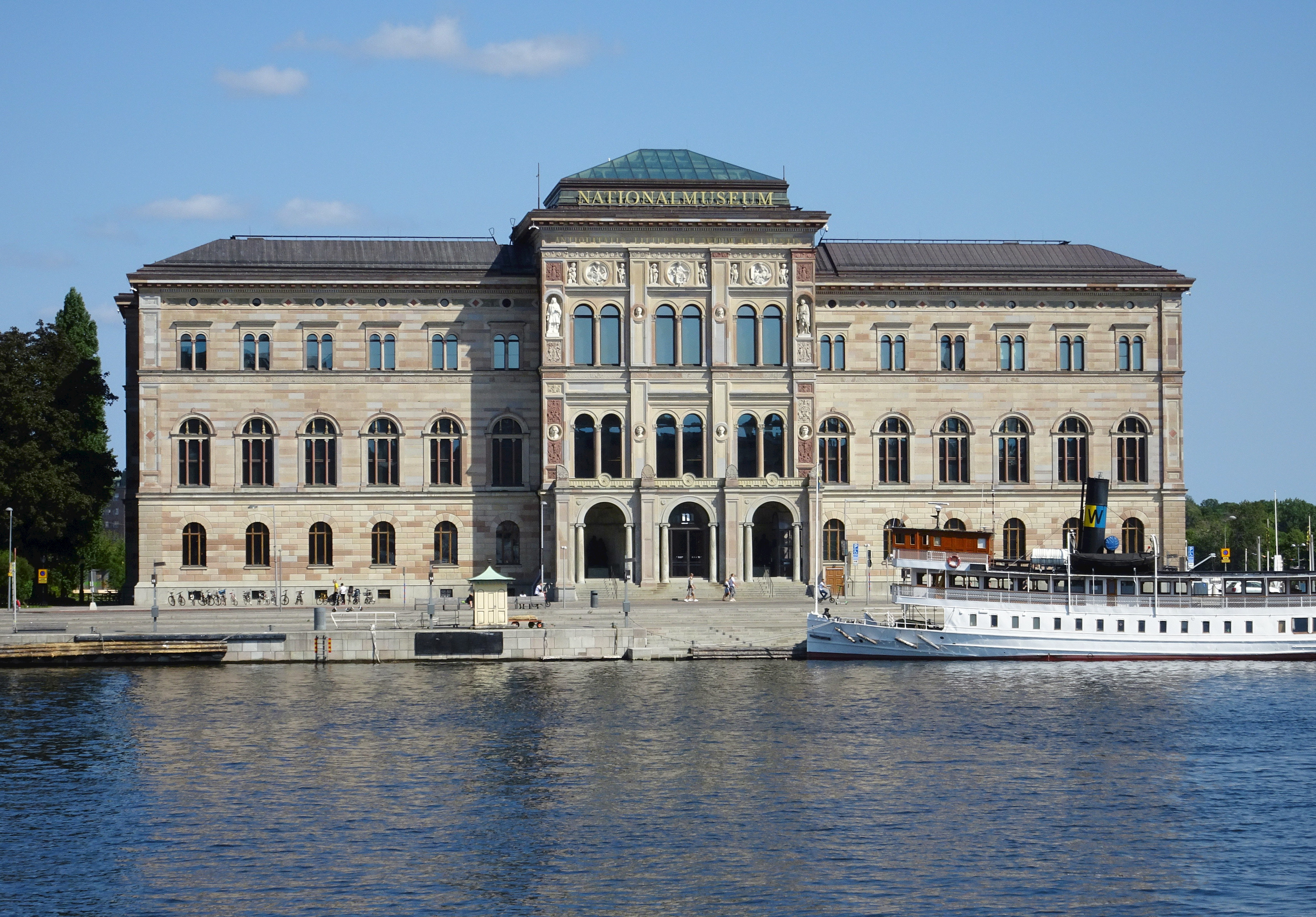
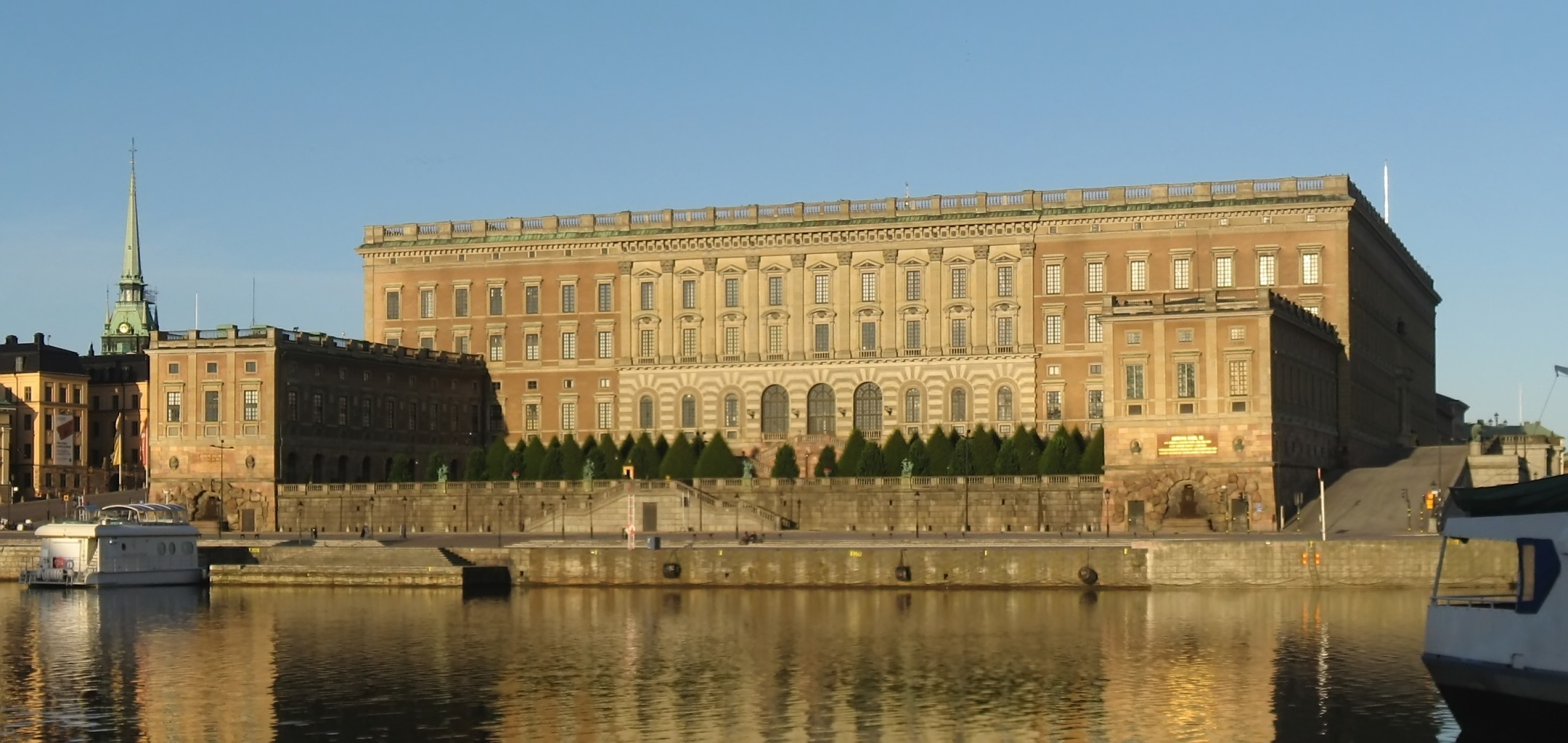
- The Old Town The Old Town Stortorget Strandvägen Nationalmuseum Stockholm Palace

- Flag Coat of arms
- Nicknames: Sthlm, Eken, the Venice of the North, the Capital of Scandinavia, the Venice of Scandinavia
- Location within Sweden Location within Europe
- Coordinates: 59°19′46″N 18°4′7″E
- Country: Sweden
- Province: Södermanland and Uppland
- County: Stockholm County
- First mention: 1252
- Charter: 13th century

Government
  - Mayor: Emilia Bjuggren (S)

Area
  - Capital city: 188 km^{2} (73 sq mi)
  - Urban: 381.63 km^{2} (147.35 sq mi)
  - Metro: 6,519 km^{2} (2,517 sq mi)
- Elevation: 28 m (92 ft)

Population (2025)
  - Capital city: 996,264
  - Rank: 1st
  - Density: 5,300/km^{2} (13,700/sq mi)
  - Urban: 1,617,407
  - Urban density: 4,238.2/km^{2} (10,977/sq mi)
  - Metro: 2,480,063
  - Metro density: 380.4/km^{2} (985.3/sq mi)
- Demonyms: Stockholmare; Stockholmer; Stockholmite

GDP (nominal, 2024)
  - Metro: €179.24 billion (US$202.3 billion)
  - Per capita: €73,015 (US$82,409.71)
- Time zone: UTC+1 (CET)
  - Summer (DST): UTC+2 (CEST)
- Postal code: 100 00-199 99
- Area code: +46-8
- Website: start.stockholm

Stockholm (/ˈstɒkhoʊ(l)m/; Swedish: [ˈstɔ̂kː(h)ɔlm]) is the capital and most populous city of Sweden, as well as the largest urban area in the Nordic countries. Approximately 1 million people live in the municipality, with 1.6 million in the urban area, and 2.5 million in the metropolitan area. The city stretches across fourteen islands where Lake Mälaren flows into the Baltic Sea. Outside the city to the east, and along the coast, is the island chain of the Stockholm archipelago. The area has been settled since the Stone Age, in the 6th millennium BC, and was founded as a city in 1252 by Swedish statesman Birger Jarl. The city serves as the county seat of Stockholm County.

Stockholm is the cultural, media, political, and economic centre of Sweden. The Stockholm region alone accounts for over a third of the country's GDP, and is among the top 10 regions in Europe by GDP per capita. Stockholm is classified by the GaWC as an Alpha− world city and it is the largest in Scandinavia and the main centre for corporate headquarters in the Nordic region. The city is home to some of Europe's top-ranking universities, such as the Karolinska Institute (medicine), KTH Royal Institute of Technology, Stockholm School of Economics and Stockholm University. It hosts the annual Nobel Prize ceremonies and banquet at the Stockholm Concert Hall and Stockholm City Hall. One of the city's most prized museums, the Vasa Museum, is the most visited museum in Scandinavia. The Stockholm Metro, opened in 1950, is well known for the decor of its stations; it has been called the longest art gallery in the world. The city was the host of the 1912 Summer Olympics, and has played host to several other international sports events since.

Stockholm is Sweden's primary financial centre, one of the largest in Scandinavia, and hosts several of Sweden's largest companies. Furthermore, the headquarters of most of Sweden's largest banks are in Stockholm. Stockholm is one of Europe's major tech centres; the city has sometimes been called Europe's innovation hub. The Stockholm region has a GDP of around $180 billion, and Stockholm County has the highest GDP per capita of all counties in Sweden.

Stockholm is the seat of the Swedish government and most of its agencies, including the highest courts in the judiciary, and the official residences of the Swedish monarch and the prime minister. The government has its seat in the Rosenbad building, the Riksdag (Swedish parliament) is seated in the Parliament House, and the prime minister's residence is adjacent at the Sager House. Stockholm Palace is the official residence and principal workplace of the Swedish monarch, while Drottningholm Palace in neighbouring Ekerö serves as the Royal Family's private residence.

== History ==
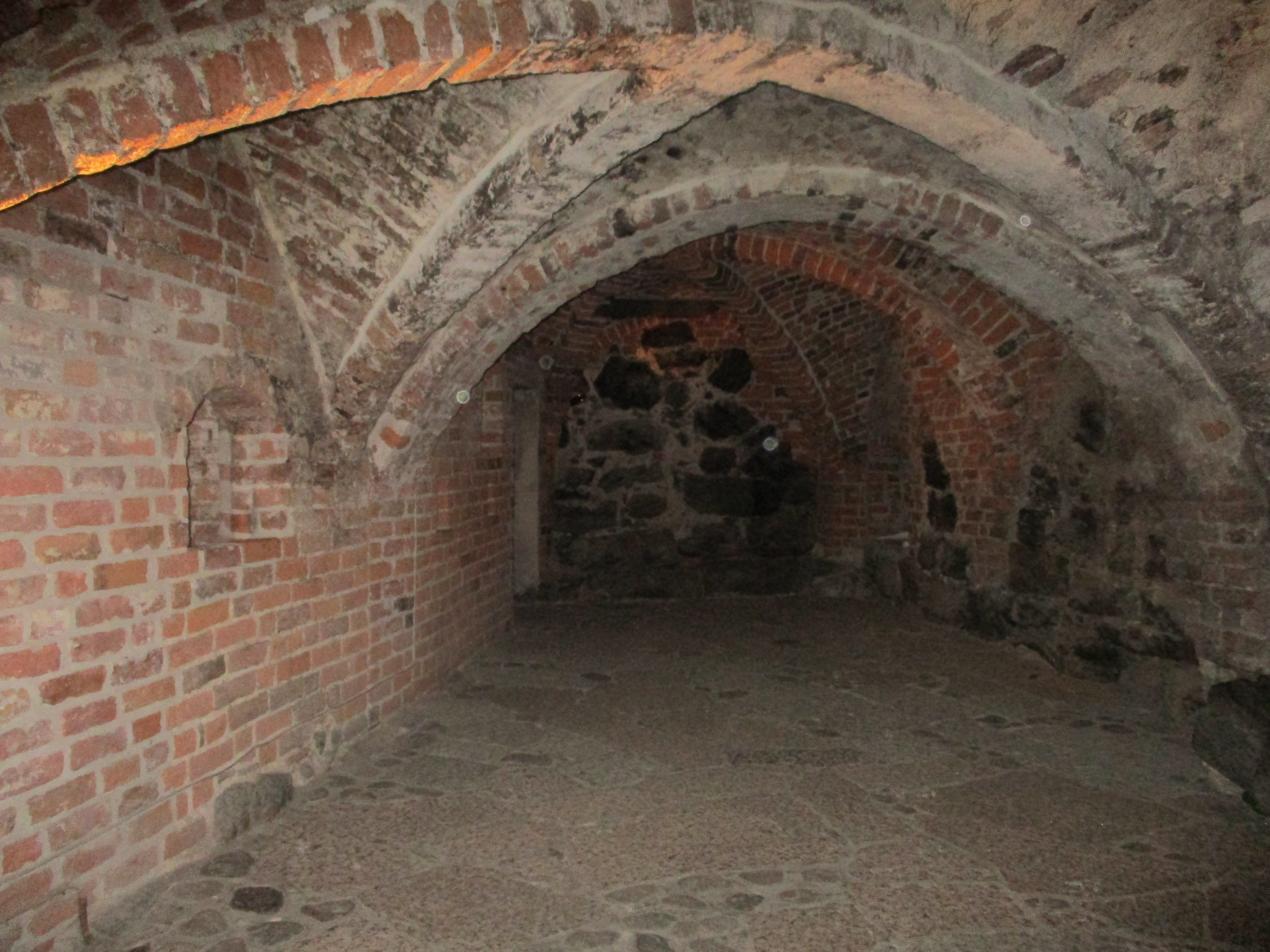
A 14th-century vaulted cellar remains of the Black Friars' Monastery in the Old Town

The location of Stockholm appears in Norse sagas as Agnafit, and in Heimskringla in connection with the legendary king Agne. Birka, located near Stockholm, was one of Sweden's major trade centres during the Viking Age, and its restored remains are one of Stockholm County's most-visited sites.

The earliest written mention of the name Stockholm dates from 1252, by which time the mines in Bergslagen made it an important site in the iron trade. The first part of the name (stock) means log in Swedish, although it may also be connected to an old German word (Stock) meaning fortification. The second part of the name (holm) means islet and is thought to refer to the islet Helgeandsholmen in central Stockholm. One theory for the name is that it refers to pile barrages. According to Erik's Chronicle the city is said to have been founded by Birger Jarl to protect Sweden from sea invasions made by Karelians after the pillage of Sigtuna on Lake Mälaren in the summer of 1187.

Stockholm's core, the present Old Town (Gamla Stan) was built on the central island next to Helgeandsholmen from the mid-13th century onward. The city originally rose to prominence as a result of the Baltic trade of the Hanseatic League. Stockholm developed strong economic and cultural linkages with Lübeck, Hamburg, Gdańsk (Danzig), Visby, Tallinn (Reval), and Riga during this time.

Stockholm's oldest preserved charter, the Letter of Privilege from the Privy Council (Riksrådets privilegiebrev), was issued by the Privy Council of Sweden on 1 May 1436 as a reward for the city's loyalty and service to the realm. The document granted Stockholm significant rights and freedoms, affirming its role as the political and economic centre of Sweden. It is regarded as marking the beginning of Stockholm's status as the de facto capital of Sweden.

The strategic and economic importance of the city made Stockholm an important factor in relations between the rulers of the Kalmar Union and the Swedish anti-unionist movement in the fifteenth century and early sixteenth century. The union monarch Christian II was able to enter the city in 1520 and on 8 November of that year, a massacre of opposition figures called the Stockholm Bloodbath took place and set off further uprisings that eventually led to the breakup of the Kalmar Union with the reattainment of Swedish independence. With the accession of Gustav Vasa in 1523 and the establishment of royal power, the population of Stockholm began to grow, reaching 10,000 by 1600.

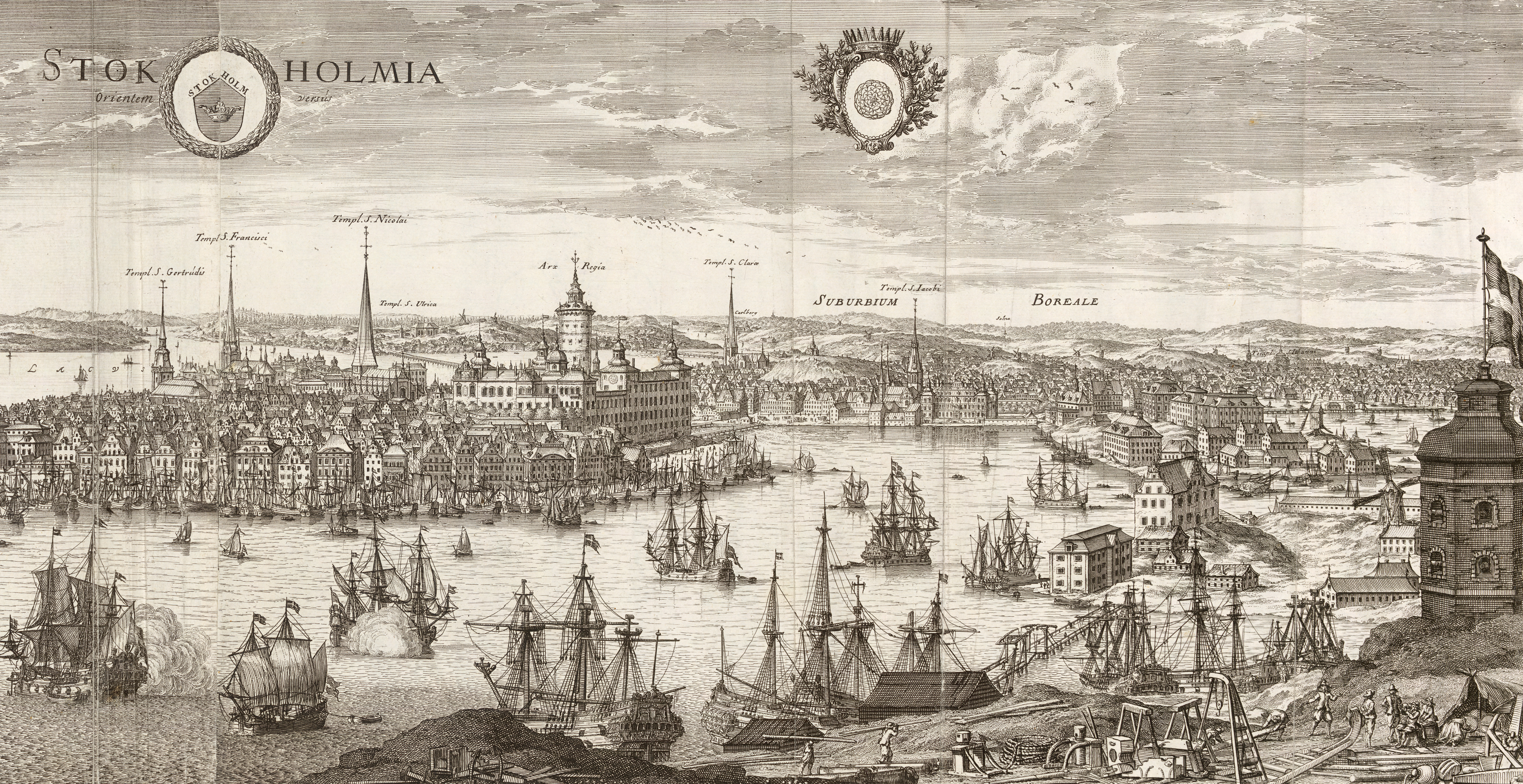
Detail of engraving of Stockholm from Suecia Antiqua et Hodierna by Erik Dahlbergh and Willem Swidde, printed in 1693

The seventeenth century saw Sweden grow into a major European power, reflected in the development of the city of Stockholm. From 1610 to 1680 the population multiplied sixfold. In 1634, Stockholm became the official capital of the Swedish empire. Trading rules were also created that gave Stockholm an essential monopoly over trade between foreign merchants and other Swedish, Baltic and Scandinavian territories. In 1697, Tre Kronor Castle burned down and was replaced eventually by Stockholm Palace; the time of the Swedish Empire also saw several architectural modernisations of the city.

The beginning of the Swedish Empire saw a renaissance in the arts and sciences; the new queen, Christina, was a strong supporter of science and culture. René Descartes, one of the most prominent European philosophers of his time, died in Stockholm; he had been hosted by the queen for several years prior to his death. Inventors, like Christopher Polhem, moved to the city during the time of the Swedish Empire. Academics also spent much time in Stockholm, like Olaus Rudbeck, rector of the Uppsala University.

Throughout Sweden's history, walls were created in Stockholm to defend the city from attacks. These defensive walls were modified throughout the 13th to the 16th century. In 1625, the Great Stockholm Fire of 1625 destroyed the southwestern section of Stadsholmen, an island in the centre of Stockholm. The amount of destruction led to the beginning of the demolition of the Stockholm walls. Today, most of the younger city walls cannot be found anywhere above ground. However, parts of the northern city walls are preserved in the modern Museum of Medieval Stockholm.

Map of Stockholm (1713)

In 1710, a plague killed about 20,000 (36 percent) of the population. After the end of the Great Northern War the city stagnated; population growth halted and economic growth slowed. The city was in shock after having lost its place as the capital of a great power. However, Stockholm maintained its role as Sweden's political centre and continued to develop as the country's economic and cultural capital.

During the Age of Enlightenment in the late eighteenth century, the city flourished. The new monarch, Gustav III, proved an able and energetic regnant; his economic policies helped the Swedish economy develop, and his partially successful war against Russia restored some of Sweden's international reputation. The king was an avid patron of the arts, and scientists and cultural figures flocked to Stockholm on a scale unprecedented since the reign of Queen Christina.

During this time, Carl Michael Bellman and Joseph Martin Kraus helped develop the city's music, a process further accelerated by the founding of the Royal Swedish Opera. Various artists and writers became prominent, funded by the king and other cultural patrons like Carl Gustaf Tessin; the two aforementioned figures laid the base for Sweden's Nationalmuseum at this time. Science also became prevalent; renowned figures like Carl Linnaeus and Anders Celsius spent time in Stockholm, and various research institutes, like the Stockholm Observatory, were founded.

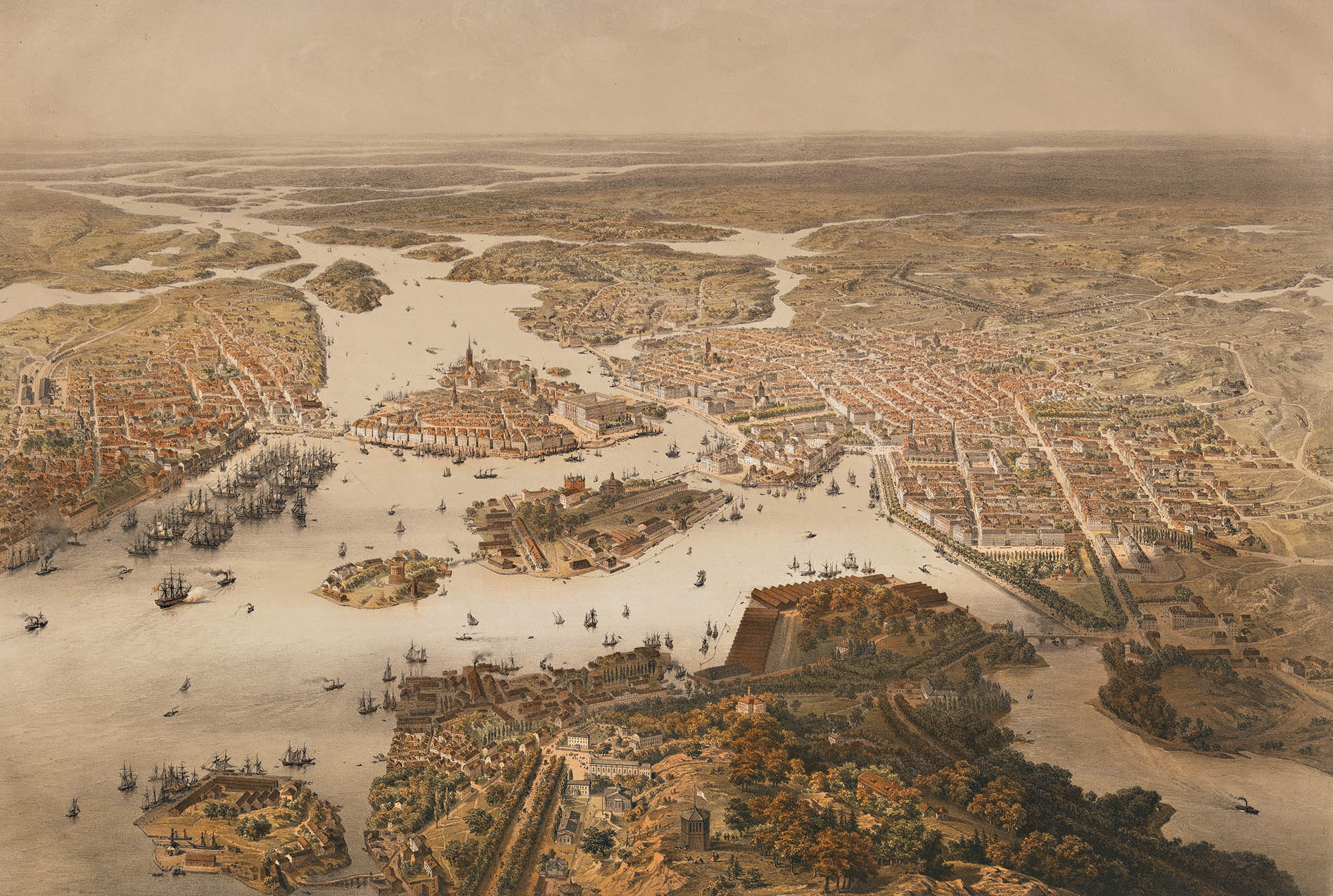
Panorama over Stockholm c. 1868 as seen from a hot air balloon

The early nineteenth century saw a major economic decline of Stockholm and Sweden as a whole, but by the second half of the nineteenth century, Stockholm had regained its leading economic role. New industries emerged with industrialisation and Stockholm was transformed into an important trade and service centre as well as a key gateway point within Sweden. The population also grew dramatically during this time, mainly through immigration. At the end of the nineteenth century, less than 40% of the residents were Stockholm-born, with most migrants being from poorer rural Sweden; major settlement began to expand outside the historical city limits. The nineteenth century also saw the establishment of a number of scientific institutes and universities, including the Karolinska Institutet and KTH Royal Institute of Technology. The General Art and Industrial Exposition was held in 1897, drawing international attention. From 1887 to 1953 the Old Stockholm telephone tower was a landmark; originally built to link phone lines, it became redundant after these were buried, and it was later used for advertising before its demolition in the twentieth century. The early twentieth century also saw the creation of the Nobel Prizes, some of Stockholm's most renowned institutions.

Stockholm became a modern and ethnically diverse city in the latter half of the 20th century. Many historical buildings were torn down during the modernist era, including substantial parts of the historical district of Klara (which caused major controversy), and replaced with modern architecture. However, in many other parts of Stockholm (such as in Gamla stan, Södermalm, Östermalm, Kungsholmen and Vasastan), many older buildings, blocks and streets built before the modernism and functionalism movements survived this era of demolition. Throughout the century, many industries shifted away from industrial activities into more high-tech and service industry areas, which still dominate the city's economy today.

In 2020 alone, Stockholm's population increased by 1,477. As a result of this massive population growth, there has been a proposal to build densely packed high-rise buildings in the city centre connected by elevated walkways, though these have been opposed by several groups.

== Geography ==
=== Location ===
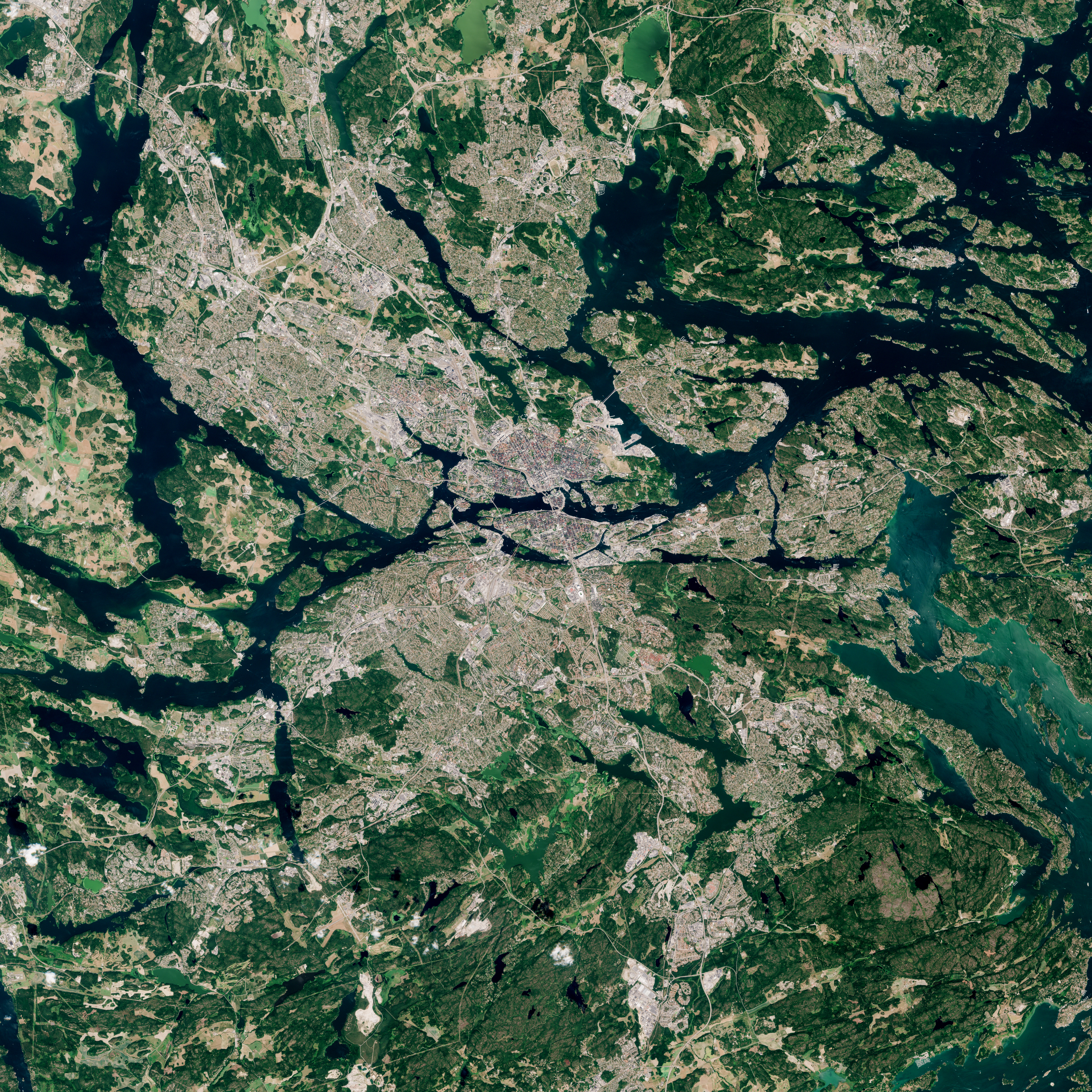
Satellite image of Stockholm in 2018 by ESA

Stockholm is located on Sweden's east coast at the 59th parallel north, where the freshwater Lake Mälaren—Sweden's third-largest lake—flows out into the Baltic Sea. The central parts of the city consist of fourteen islands that are continuous with the Stockholm archipelago. The geographical city centre is situated on the water, in Riddarfjärden bay. Over 30% of the city area is made up of waterways and another 30% is made up of parks and green spaces.

Positioned at the eastern end of the Central Swedish lowland and near the Bergslagen region, the city's location reflects the early orientation of Swedish trade toward the Baltic region.

Stockholm belongs to the temperate deciduous forest biome, which means the climate is very similar to that of the far northeastern area of the United States and coastal Nova Scotia in Canada. The average annual temperature is 7.9 °C (46 °F). The average rainfall is 531 mm (21 in) per year.

For details about the other municipalities in the Stockholm area, see the pertinent articles. North of Stockholm Municipality: Järfälla, Solna, Täby, Sollentuna, Lidingö, Upplands Väsby, Österåker, Sigtuna, Sundbyberg, Danderyd, Vallentuna, Ekerö, Upplands-Bro, Vaxholm, and Norrtälje. South of Stockholm: Huddinge, Nacka, Botkyrka, Haninge, Tyresö, Värmdö, Södertälje, Salem, Nykvarn and Nynäshamn.

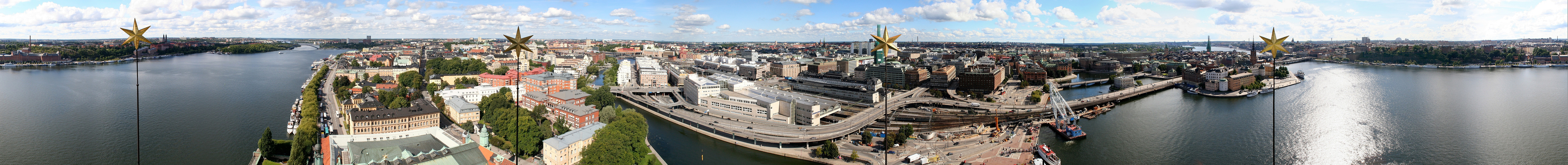
A 360-degree panorama of Stockholm inner quarters taken from the City Hall tower. From left to right: Riddarfjärden with Södermalm in the background, Kungsholmen, Klara sjö, Norrmalm with the central station in the foreground, Stockholms ström, Riddarholmen with the Old Town, and again Riddarfjärden with Södermalm.

=== Stockholm Municipality ===
Stockholm Municipality is an administrative unit defined by geographical borders. The semi-official name for the municipality is City of Stockholm (Swedish: Stockholms stad). As a municipality, the City of Stockholm is subdivided into district councils, which carry responsibility for primary schools, social, leisure and cultural services within their respective areas. The municipality is usually described in terms of its three main parts: Stockholm City Centre (Innerstaden), Southern Stockholm (Söderort) and Western Stockholm (Västerort). The districts of these parts are:

==== Stockholm City Centre ====
- Gamla Stan
- Kungsholmen
- Norrmalm
- Södermalm
- Vasastan
- Östermalm

==== Söderort ====
- Enskede-Årsta-Vantör
- Farsta
- Hägersten-Liljeholmen
- Skarpnäck
- Skärholmen
- Älvsjö

==== Västerort ====
- Bromma
- Hässelby-Vällingby
- Rinkeby-Kista
- Spånga-Tensta

The modern centre Norrmalm (concentrated around the town square Sergels torg) is the largest shopping district in Sweden.

=== Climate ===
Stockholm has a warm-summer humid continental climate (Köppen: Dfb). Although winters are cold, average temperatures generally remain above 0°C for much of the year. Summers are pleasantly warm, and precipitation occurs throughout the year.

Due to the city's high northerly latitude, the length of the day varies widely from more than 18 hours around midsummer to only around 6 hours in late December. The nights from late May until mid-July are not completely dark even when cloudy. Stockholm has relatively mild weather compared to other locations at a similar latitude, or even farther south. With an average of 1900 hours of sunshine per year, it is also one of the sunniest cities in Northern Europe, receiving more sunshine than Paris, London and a few other major European cities of a more southerly latitude. Because of the urban heat island effect and the prevailing wind travelling overland rather than sea during summer months, Stockholm has the warmest July months of the Nordic capitals. Stockholm has an annual average snow cover between 75 and 100 days.

Despite its mild climate, Stockholm is located further north than parts of Canada that are above the Arctic tree line at sea level.

Summers average daytime high temperatures of 20–25 °C (68–77 °F) and lows of around 13 °C (55 °F), but temperatures can reach 30 °C (86 °F) on some days. Days above 30 °C (86 °F) occur on average 1.55 days per year (1992–2011). Days between 25 °C (77 °F) and 30 °C (86 °F) are relatively common especially in July and August. Night-time lows of above 20 °C (68 °F) are rare, and hot summer nights vary from 17 to 18 °C (63 to 64 °F). Winters generally bring cloudy weather with the most precipitation falling in December and January (as either rain or snow). The average winter temperatures range from −3 to −1 °C (27 to 30 °F), and occasionally drop below −20 °C (−4 °F) in the outskirts of the city. Spring and autumn are generally cool to mild.

The climate table below presents weather data from the years 1991–2020. According to ongoing measurements, the temperature has increased during the years 1991–2020 as compared with the last series, from 1961 to 1990. This increase averages about 1.0 °C (1.8 °F) over all months. Warming is most pronounced during the winter months, with an increase of more than 2.0 °C (3.6 °F) in January. For the 2002–2014 measurements some further increases have been found, although some months such as June have been relatively flat.

The highest temperature ever recorded in Stockholm was 36 °C (97 °F) on the date of 3 July 1811; the lowest was −32 °C (−26 °F) on 20 January 1814. The temperature has not dropped to below −25.1 °C (−13.2 °F) since 10 January 1987.

The warmest month ever recorded was July 2018 with a mean temperature of 22.5 °C (72.5 °F) which is also the nationwide record.

Annual precipitation is 546.4 mm (21.51 in) with around 170 wet days and light to moderate rainfall throughout the year. The precipitation is not uniformly distributed throughout the year. The second half of the year receives 50% more than the first half. Snowfall occurs mainly from November through March. Snowfall may occasionally occur in late October as well as in April.

Climate data for Stockholm (Observatorielunden), 1991–2020 normals, extremes since 1901
Month	Jan	Feb	Mar	Apr	May	Jun	Jul	Aug	Sep	Oct	Nov	Dec	Year
Record high °C (°F)	11.0 (51.8)	12.2 (54.0)	17.8 (64.0)	26.1 (79.0)	29.0 (84.2)	32.2 (90.0)	34.8 (94.6)	35.4 (95.7)	27.9 (82.2)	20.2 (68.4)	15.1 (59.2)	12.7 (54.9)	35.4 (95.7)
Mean maximum °C (°F)	6.6 (43.9)	7.1 (44.8)	12.0 (53.6)	18.8 (65.8)	24.3 (75.7)	27.5 (81.5)	29.7 (85.5)	28.2 (82.8)	22.4 (72.3)	15.8 (60.4)	10.7 (51.3)	8.5 (47.3)	30.6 (87.1)
Mean daily maximum °C (°F)	1.0 (33.8)	1.2 (34.2)	4.7 (40.5)	10.7 (51.3)	16.5 (61.7)	20.8 (69.4)	23.6 (74.5)	22.1 (71.8)	16.6 (61.9)	10.1 (50.2)	5.4 (41.7)	2.5 (36.5)	11.3 (52.3)
Daily mean °C (°F)	−1.0 (30.2)	−1.0 (30.2)	1.6 (34.9)	6.3 (43.3)	11.4 (52.5)	15.7 (60.3)	18.7 (65.7)	17.7 (63.9)	13.1 (55.6)	7.7 (45.9)	3.6 (38.5)	0.6 (33.1)	7.9 (46.2)
Mean daily minimum °C (°F)	−2.9 (26.8)	−3.2 (26.2)	−1.1 (30.0)	2.6 (36.7)	7.1 (44.8)	11.6 (52.9)	14.8 (58.6)	14.2 (57.6)	10.2 (50.4)	5.5 (41.9)	1.9 (35.4)	−1.2 (29.8)	5.0 (41.0)
Mean minimum °C (°F)	−11.2 (11.8)	−10.9 (12.4)	−7.5 (18.5)	−2.6 (27.3)	1.9 (35.4)	7.0 (44.6)	10.6 (51.1)	9.7 (49.5)	4.6 (40.3)	−0.8 (30.6)	−4.5 (23.9)	−8.3 (17.1)	−13.7 (7.3)
Record low °C (°F)	−28.2 (−18.8)	−25.5 (−13.9)	−22.0 (−7.6)	−11.5 (11.3)	−4.5 (23.9)	1.0 (33.8)	6.0 (42.8)	4.8 (40.6)	−1.5 (29.3)	−9.0 (15.8)	−17.0 (1.4)	−21.0 (−5.8)	−28.2 (−18.8)
Average precipitation mm (inches)	37.0 (1.46)	29.4 (1.16)	27.3 (1.07)	29.2 (1.15)	34.0 (1.34)	61.7 (2.43)	61.5 (2.42)	66.2 (2.61)	53.3 (2.10)	51.4 (2.02)	47.6 (1.87)	47.8 (1.88)	546.4 (21.51)
Average snowfall cm (inches)	23.3 (9.2)	25.6 (10.1)	18.1 (7.1)	5.9 (2.3)	1.1 (0.4)	0.0 (0.0)	0.0 (0.0)	0.0 (0.0)	0.0 (0.0)	1.8 (0.7)	6.6 (2.6)	20.3 (8.0)	102.7 (40.4)
Mean monthly sunshine hours	43.9	75.1	150.8	215.9	277.4	277.4	279.5	234.5	170.3	95.8	44.6	33.4	1,898.6
Mean daily sunshine hours	1.4	2.7	4.9	7.2	8.9	9.2	9.0	7.6	5.7	3.1	1.5	1.1	5.2
Mean daily daylight hours	7.0	9.3	11.9	14.5	17.0	18.5	17.7	15.5	12.8	10.2	7.7	6.2	12.4
Percentage possible sunshine	20	29	41	50	53	50	51	49	44	30	19	17	38
Average ultraviolet index	0	1	1	3	4	5	5	4	3	1	0	0	2
Source 1: SMHI Open Data SMHI 1991–2020 normals
Source 2: Weather Atlas (sunshine, uv data)

Climate data for Stockholm (Bromma Airport). 1991–2020 normals and extremes
Month	Jan	Feb	Mar	Apr	May	Jun	Jul	Aug	Sep	Oct	Nov	Dec	Year
Record high °C (°F)	11.5 (52.7)	12.3 (54.1)	17.7 (63.9)	27.0 (80.6)	28.6 (83.5)	30.8 (87.4)	34.2 (93.6)	31.7 (89.1)	26.1 (79.0)	20.7 (69.3)	15.1 (59.2)	13.2 (55.8)	34.2 (93.6)
Mean maximum °C (°F)	6.7 (44.1)	7.3 (45.1)	12.6 (54.7)	19.1 (66.4)	24.0 (75.2)	26.9 (80.4)	29.0 (84.2)	27.5 (81.5)	22.1 (71.8)	16.2 (61.2)	10.9 (51.6)	7.6 (45.7)	29.8 (85.6)
Mean daily maximum °C (°F)	0.9 (33.6)	1.2 (34.2)	4.9 (40.8)	10.9 (51.6)	16.4 (61.5)	20.4 (68.7)	23.3 (73.9)	22.0 (71.6)	16.8 (62.2)	10.3 (50.5)	5.3 (41.5)	2.3 (36.1)	11.3 (52.3)
Daily mean °C (°F)	−1.5 (29.3)	−1.6 (29.1)	1.2 (34.2)	6.0 (42.8)	11.1 (52.0)	15.4 (59.7)	18.3 (64.9)	17.3 (63.1)	12.7 (54.9)	7.2 (45.0)	3.2 (37.8)	0.1 (32.2)	7.4 (45.3)
Mean daily minimum °C (°F)	−4.1 (24.6)	−4.6 (23.7)	−2.4 (27.7)	1.1 (34.0)	5.7 (42.3)	10.4 (50.7)	13.4 (56.1)	12.7 (54.9)	8.7 (47.7)	4.1 (39.4)	0.8 (33.4)	−2.4 (27.7)	3.7 (38.7)
Mean minimum °C (°F)	−14.8 (5.4)	−14.2 (6.4)	−11.3 (11.7)	−5.2 (22.6)	−0.7 (30.7)	4.7 (40.5)	8.6 (47.5)	6.4 (43.5)	1.3 (34.3)	−4.2 (24.4)	−7.1 (19.2)	−11.5 (11.3)	−17.5 (0.5)
Record low °C (°F)	−24.7 (−12.5)	−23.6 (−10.5)	−23.5 (−10.3)	−9.1 (15.6)	−4.7 (23.5)	1.9 (35.4)	6.0 (42.8)	2.6 (36.7)	−3.0 (26.6)	−10.0 (14.0)	−14.0 (6.8)	−24.0 (−11.2)	−24.7 (−12.5)
Average precipitation mm (inches)	36.7 (1.44)	29.5 (1.16)	28.0 (1.10)	29.5 (1.16)	33.6 (1.32)	59.2 (2.33)	57.6 (2.27)	65.9 (2.59)	50.2 (1.98)	50.0 (1.97)	47.9 (1.89)	49.1 (1.93)	537.4 (21.16)
Source 1: SMHI Open Data
Source 2: SMHI 1991–2020 normals

Climate data for Stockholm (2002–2022 averages & extremes)
Month	Jan	Feb	Mar	Apr	May	Jun	Jul	Aug	Sep	Oct	Nov	Dec	Year
Record high °C (°F)	11.0 (51.8)	11.7 (53.1)	17.4 (63.3)	23.5 (74.3)	28.9 (84.0)	31.7 (89.1)	34.8 (94.6)	32.2 (90.0)	26.2 (79.2)	19.4 (66.9)	15.1 (59.2)	12.7 (54.9)	34.8 (94.6)
Mean maximum °C (°F)	6.9 (44.4)	7.4 (45.3)	12.7 (54.9)	18.5 (65.3)	24.6 (76.3)	28.3 (82.9)	30.2 (86.4)	28.4 (83.1)	22.7 (72.9)	15.9 (60.6)	11.4 (52.5)	7.7 (45.9)	31.1 (88.0)
Mean daily maximum °C (°F)	0.9 (33.6)	1.4 (34.5)	5.2 (41.4)	11.1 (52.0)	16.8 (62.2)	21.5 (70.7)	24.0 (75.2)	22.4 (72.3)	17.0 (62.6)	10.4 (50.7)	5.9 (42.6)	2.6 (36.7)	11.6 (52.9)
Daily mean °C (°F)	−1.4 (29.5)	−0.8 (30.6)	2.1 (35.8)	6.9 (44.4)	12.2 (54.0)	16.8 (62.2)	19.5 (67.1)	18.4 (65.1)	13.7 (56.7)	8.0 (46.4)	4.1 (39.4)	0.8 (33.4)	8.4 (47.1)
Mean daily minimum °C (°F)	−2.9 (26.8)	−2.9 (26.8)	−1.0 (30.2)	2.7 (36.9)	7.5 (45.5)	12.1 (53.8)	15.0 (59.0)	14.3 (57.7)	10.4 (50.7)	5.6 (42.1)	2.3 (36.1)	−1.1 (30.0)	5.2 (41.3)
Mean minimum °C (°F)	−11.1 (12.0)	−10.4 (13.3)	−7.3 (18.9)	−2.3 (27.9)	2.1 (35.8)	7.2 (45.0)	10.9 (51.6)	9.7 (49.5)	4.7 (40.5)	−0.4 (31.3)	−4.3 (24.3)	−8.2 (17.2)	−13.7 (7.3)
Record low °C (°F)	−19.3 (−2.7)	−21.0 (−5.8)	−14.6 (5.7)	−5.0 (23.0)	−1.4 (29.5)	3.7 (38.7)	7.8 (46.0)	6.5 (43.7)	1.2 (34.2)	−4.7 (23.5)	−11.3 (11.7)	−18.5 (−1.3)	−21.0 (−5.8)
Average precipitation mm (inches)	40.7 (1.60)	30.6 (1.20)	24.1 (0.95)	22.7 (0.89)	39.5 (1.56)	62.3 (2.45)	57.2 (2.25)	70.1 (2.76)	45.1 (1.78)	50.6 (1.99)	48.1 (1.89)	45.3 (1.78)	536.3 (21.1)
Mean monthly sunshine hours	40	74	167	236	275	292	284	239	174	102	46	34	1,963
Source 1: SMHI Open Data
Source 2: SMHI Monthly Data 2002–2022

=== Daylight ===
Stockholm's location just south of the 60th parallel north means that the number of daylight hours is relatively small during winter – about six hours – while in June and the first half of July, the nights are relatively short, with about 18 hours of daylight. Due to its eastern position within Sweden's respective time zone, sunsets occur as early as 2:46 PM in mid-December. Around the summer solstice, the sun never reaches further below the horizon than 7.3 degrees. This gives the sky a bright blue colour in summer once the sun has set because it does not get any darker than nautical twilight. Also, when looking straight up towards the zenith, few stars are visible after the sun has gone down. This is not to be confused with the midnight sun, which occurs north of the Arctic Circle, around 7 degrees farther north.

== Government ==
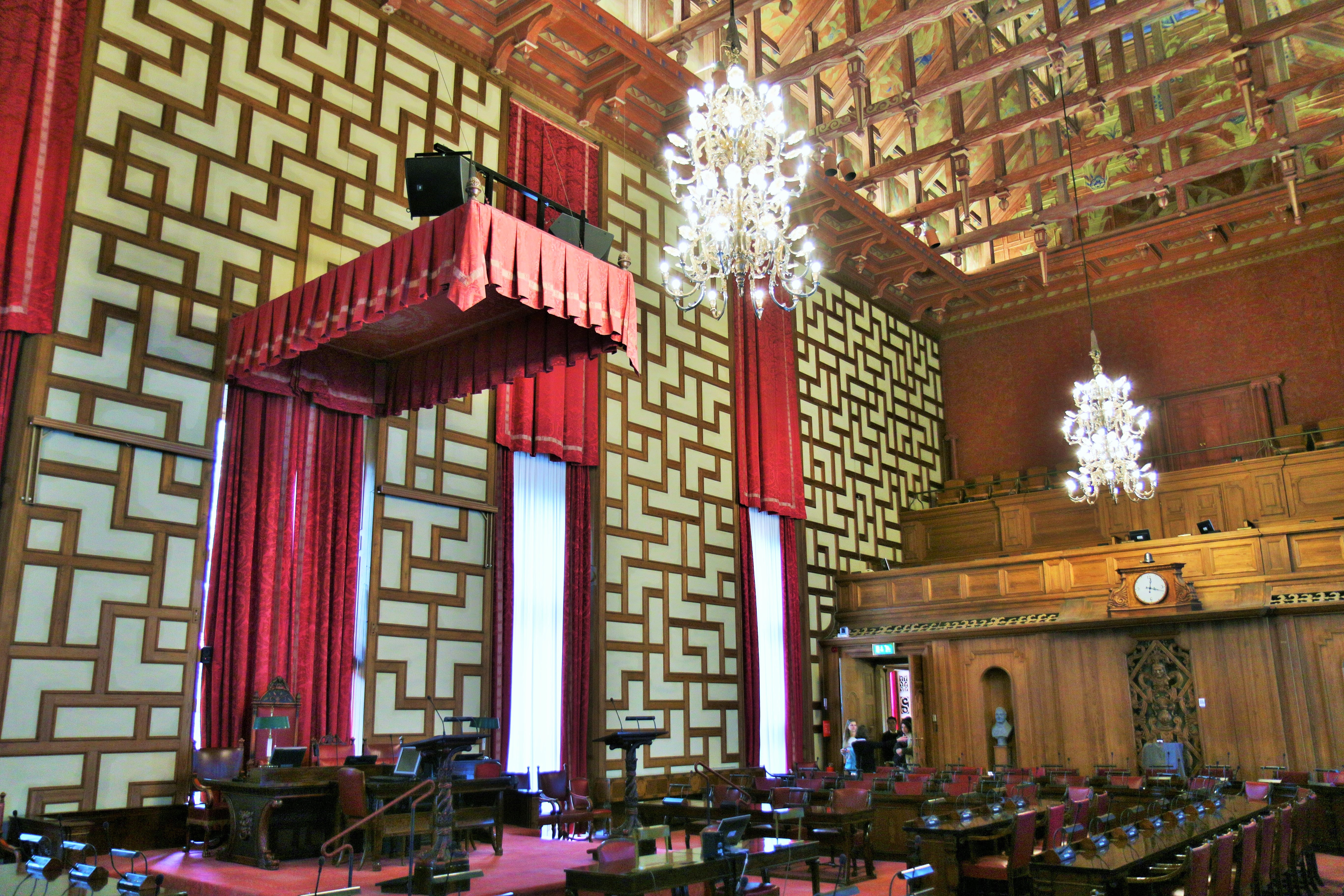
The municipal council chamber (Swedish: Rådssalen), inside Stockholm City Hall

The Stockholm Municipal Council (Swedish: Stockholms kommunfullmäktige) is the name of the local assembly. Its 101 councillors are elected concurrently with general elections, held at the same time as the elections to the Riksdag and county councils. The Council convenes twice every month at Stockholm City Hall, and the meetings are open to the public. The matters on which the councillors decide have generally already been drafted and discussed by various boards and committees. Once decisions are referred for practical implementation, the employees of the City administrations and companies take over.

The elected majority has a Mayor and eight Vice Mayors. The Mayor and each majority Vice Mayor is the head of a department, with responsibility for a particular area of operation, such as City Planning. The opposition also has four Vice Mayors, but they hold no executive power. Together the Mayor and the 12 Vice Mayors form the Council of Mayors, and they prepare matters for the City Executive Board. The Mayor holds a special position among the Vice Mayors, chairing both the Council of Mayors and the City Executive Board.

The City Executive Board (Kommunstyrelsen) is elected by the City Council and is equivalent to a cabinet. The City Executive Board renders an opinion in all matters decided by the council and bears the overall responsibility for follow-up, evaluation and execution of its decisions. The Board is also responsible for financial administration and long-term development. The City Executive Board consists of 13 members, who represent both the majority and the opposition. Its meetings are not open to the public.

=== National government ===
The Swedish national government, including the legislature, government, and highest courts in the judiciary, is based in Stockholm. The national legislature, the Riksdag, is based at Parliament House. The official residence of the Swedish monarch is Stockholm Palace, while the private residence is Drottningholm Palace in neighbouring Ekerö. The prime minister's official residence is Sager House. Most Swedish government agencies have their headquarters in Stockholm or nearby Solna.

== Economy ==
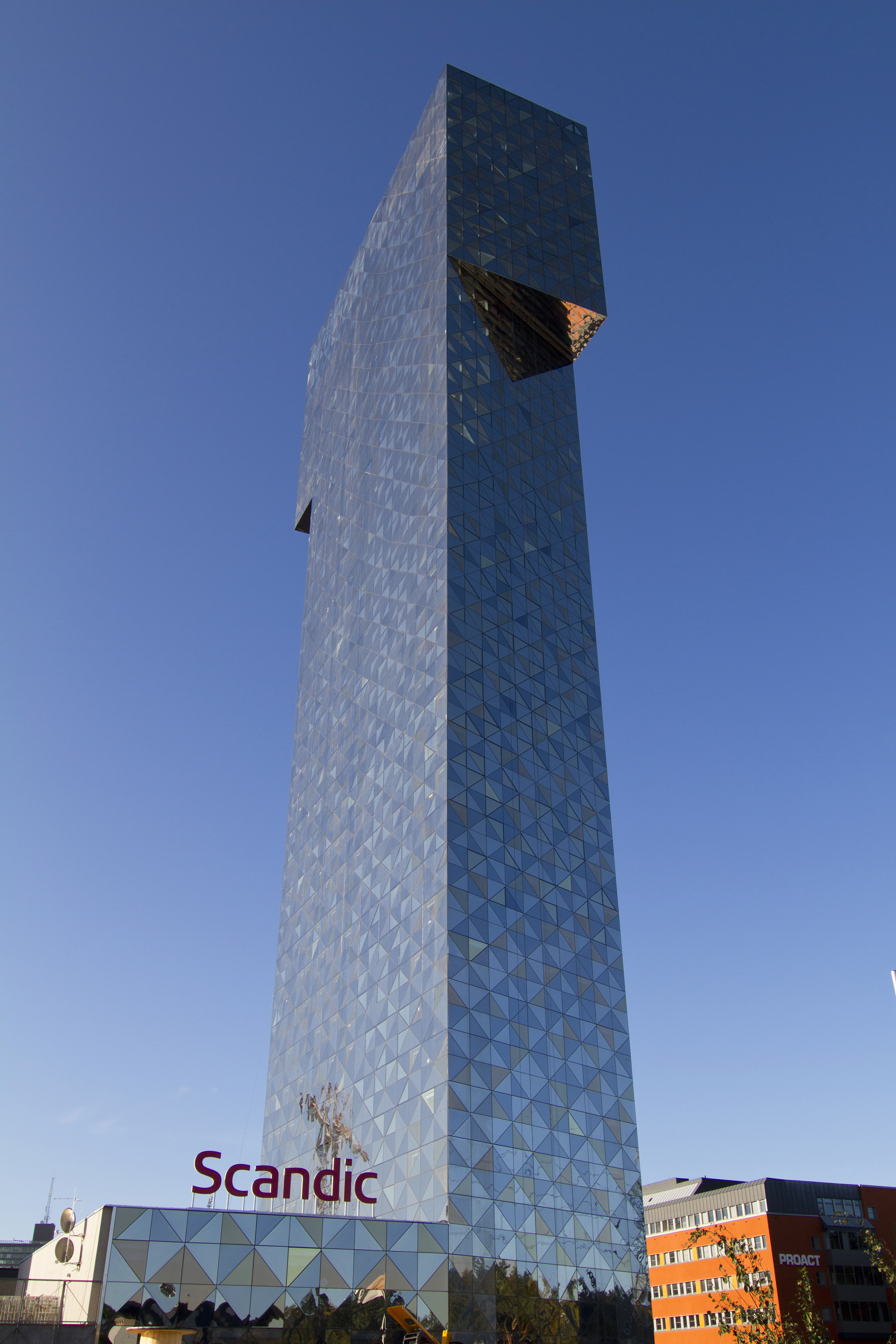
Victoria Tower is one of the tallest buildings in Stockholm, located in Kista.

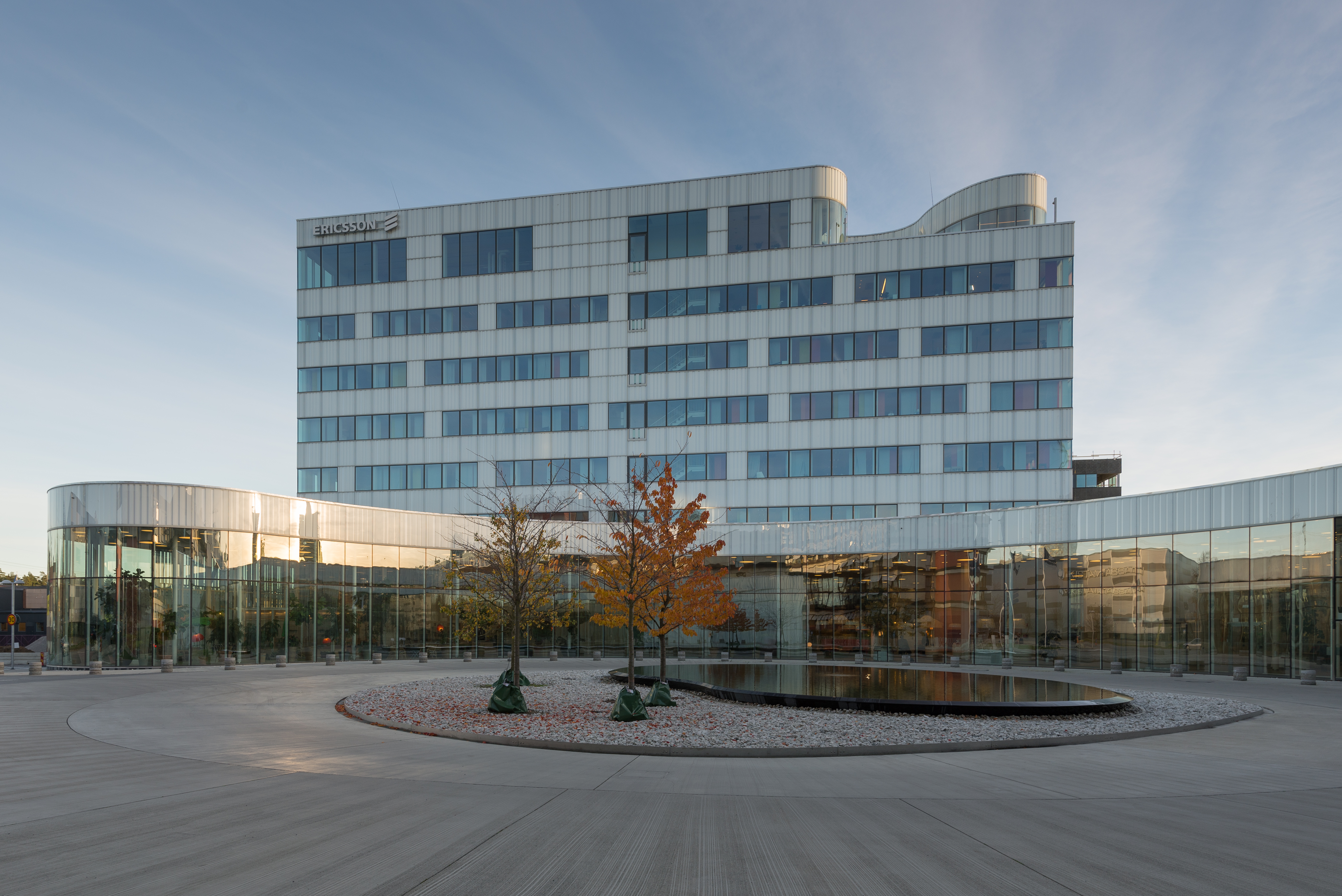
Headquarters of Ericsson

As the primary financial centre in Sweden, Stockholm is an influential hub for trade, finance and technology in Europe, and one of Scandinavia's largest financial centres. The Stockholm region is the leading region in Sweden by both GDP and GDP per capita, and is amongst the ten wealthiest regions in the European Union when measured by the latter.

Many of Sweden's largest companies are headquartered in the city; they are drawn by its central location, skilled workforce and preeminent financial sector. These companies include some of the Nordic region's most valuable corporations, like Ericsson, which is one of the world's largest telecommunications companies, or Atlas Copco, which is one of the world's largest industrial companies; other large companies based in Stockholm include Electrolux, H&M and Securitas AB. Some of the largest investment firms in Europe are headquartered in the city, including Investor AB and Nordstjernan; also headquartered in Stockholm is EQT AB.

Stockholm is one of continental Europe's leading hubs for the technology industry; this influential industry is based in Kista, a suburb in northern Stockholm which is Europe's largest Informations and Technology cluster. Stockholm has the second most unicorns per capita in the world, after Silicon Valley; the city also has one of the highest startup rates in Europe. Prominent startup technology companies in Stockholm include Mojang, Spotify and Klarna; the latter two either have been or are among the largest startup companies in the world.

Most of Sweden's largest banks are headquartered in the city, including the SEB Group, Handelsbanken and Swedbank; Nordea had its headquarters in Stockholm until moving to Helsinki in 2018 for legal reasons involving the European Union. The Stockholm Stock Exchange, founded in 1863, is the largest stock exchange in the Nordic Countries measured by market capitalisation, listing numerous multinational Swedish companies.

Trade is a vital part of Stockholm's economy; the city's corporations are largely reliant on foreign consumers to supplement the small Swedish market. Stockholm is one of the Baltic Sea's larger ports, hosting especially cruise ships and yachts. Most of Stockholm's economy is based on export-oriented services, often towards larger, nearby European markets like Poland or Germany. Tourism is a major industry in Stockholm.

== Education ==
Research and higher education in the sciences started in Stockholm in the 18th century, with education in medicine and various research institutions such as the Stockholm Observatory. The medical education was eventually formalised in 1811 as Karolinska Institutet. KTH Royal Institute of Technology (Kungliga Tekniska högskolan) was founded in 1827 and is Scandinavia's largest higher education institute of technology with 13,000 students; it is Sweden's foremost polytechnic, and spearheaded several governmental research projects in the twentieth century. Stockholm University, founded in 1878 with university status granted in 1960, has 52,000 students as of 2008. It also incorporates historical institutions, such as the Observatory, the Swedish Museum of Natural History, as well as the botanical garden Bergianska trädgården. The Stockholm School of Economics, founded in 1909, is one of the few private institutions of higher education in Sweden, and is generally reckoned one of the most prestigious business schools in the world.

In the fine arts, educational institutions include the Royal College of Music, which has a history going back to the conservatory founded as part of the Royal Swedish Academy of Music in 1771, the Royal University College of Fine Arts, which has a similar historical association with the Royal Swedish Academy of Arts and a foundation date of 1735, and the Swedish National Academy of Mime and Acting, which is the continuation of the school of the Royal Dramatic Theatre, once attended by renowned actors like Greta Garbo. Other schools include the design school Konstfack, founded in 1844, the University College of Opera (founded in 1968 but with older roots), the University College of Dance, and the Stockholm University College of Music Education.

The Södertörn University was founded in 1995 as a multi-disciplinary institution for southern Metropolitan Stockholm, to balance the many institutions located in the northern part of the region. Other institutes of higher education include the Military Academy Karlberg, the world's oldest military academy to remain in its original location, inaugurated in 1792 and housed in Karlberg Palace; there is also the Swedish Defence University, Ersta Sköndal University College, Swedish School of Sport and Health Sciences and the University College Stockholm.

The biggest complaints from students of higher education in Stockholm are the lack of student accommodations, the difficulty in finding other accommodations and the high rent.

== Demographics ==
Stockholm (municipality) population pyramid in 2022

Origin makeup of Stockholm by single year ages in 2022

Estimated population, 1252–1775

Year	Pop.	±% p.a.
1252	100	—
1289	3,000	+9.63%
1460	6,000	+0.41%
1500	7,000	+0.39%
1523	3,000	−3.62%
1582	9,000	+1.88%
1600	9,000	+0.00%

Year	Pop.	±% p.a.
1635	16,000	+1.66%
1650	30,000	+4.28%
1685	60,000	+2.00%
1700	40,000	−2.67%
1725	48,800	+0.80%
1750	58,400	+0.72%
1775	72,300	+0.86%

Source: Stockholms Stads Utrednings- och Statistikkontor AB Befolkningen i Stockholm 1252–2005, p. 55

Historical population in 10-year intervals, 1800–Present

Year	Pop.	±%
1800	75,800	—
1810	65,600	−13.5%
1820	75,700	+15.4%
1830	80,400	+6.2%
1840	83,600	+4.0%
1850	93,070	+11.3%
1860	109,878	+18.1%
1870	133,597	+21.6%
1880	167,868	+25.7%
1890	245,331	+46.1%
1900	300,523	+22.5%
1910	343,832	+14.4%

Year	Pop.	±%
1920	419,788	+22.1%
1930	502,203	+19.6%
1940	590,543	+17.6%
1950	744,562	+26.1%
1960	808,603	+8.6%
1970	744,911	−7.9%
1980	647,214	−13.1%
1990	674,452	+4.2%
2000	750,348	+11.3%
2010	847,073	+12.9%
2020	975,551	+15.2%

Source: Stockholms Stads Utrednings- och Statistikkontor AB Befolkningen i Stockholm 1252–2005, p. 55

The Stockholm region is home to around 22% of Sweden's total population, and accounts for about 29% of its gross domestic product. The geographical notion of "Stockholm" has changed over time. By the turn of the 19th century, Stockholm largely consisted of the area today known as City Centre, roughly 35 km^{2} (14 sq mi) or one-fifth of the current municipal area. In the ensuing decades several other areas were incorporated (such as Brännkyrka Municipality in 1913, at which time it had 25,000 inhabitants, and Spånga in 1949). The municipal border was established in 1971; with the exception of Hansta, in 1982 purchased by Stockholm Municipality from Sollentuna Municipality and today a nature reserve.

- Population by country of birth (2021)
- Country: Population
Total residents	978,770
Sweden	726,020
Foreign-born	252,750 (25.8%)
Iraq	16,004
Finland	15,289
Iran	12,557
Poland	11,613
Yugoslavia	10,066
India	8,659
Somalia	8,447
Turkey	7,743
Syria	7,193
China	6,892
Eritrea	6,577
United Kingdom	6,035
Germany	5,388
Ethiopia	5,253
United States	5,232
Chile	5,204
Afghanistan	4,898
Greece	4,867
Russia	4,151
Thailand	4,052

The population was 984,748 in 2022 and is projected to reach 1,079,213 by 2030. Of the inhabitants, 482,982 were men and 492,569 women. The average age is 39 years; 40.1% of the population is between 20 and 44 years. The matrimonial statistics are that 411,273 people, or 42.2% of the population, over the age 15 were unmarried; 268,291 people, or 27.5% of the population, were married; and 104,099 or 10.7% of the population, had been married but divorced.

As of December 2021, there were 252,750 foreign-born people in Stockholm, making up 25.8% of the population. Around 57.5% of them (143,167) immigrated to Sweden when they were at least 10 years old, and 109,213 (43.9%) of them were foreign citizens. The largest nationality groups among the foreign-born people were the Iraqis (16,137), followed by Finns (15,693), Iranians (12,329) and Poles (11,569). Of the population, 336,275 residents (34.4%) of Stockholm had a foreign-background.

Residents of Stockholm are known as Stockholmers ("stockholmare"). Languages spoken in Greater Stockholm outside of Swedish include Finnish, one of the official minority languages of Sweden, and English, as well as Albanian, Bosnian, Neo-Aramaic (Sureth/Turoyo), Arabic, Turkish, Kurdish, Persian, Somali, Dutch, Spanish, Serbian and Croatian.

Stockholm has been home to a significant Finnish minority since the 13th century. At the end of the 15th century up to 20% of the population in Stockholm consisted of Finns. Finska församlingen has offered church services since the 16th century, and in 1725 the Finnish Church was opened. 74,000 people in Stockholm have a Finnish background, which makes Stockholm home to the largest Finnish population in Sweden. Finnish along with Meänkieli and the Sami languages have protected minority status in Stockholm. This gives their speakers the right to use their language when contacting authorities, as well as the right to child and elderly care in their languages. Romani and Yiddish are also recognized minority languages, and have a strengthened right to their language in education.

The entire Stockholm metropolitan area, consisting of 26 municipalities, has a population of over 2.2 million, making it the most populous region in the Nordic countries. The Stockholm urban area, defined only for statistical purposes, had a total population of 1,630,738 in 2015. In the following municipalities some of the districts are contained within the Stockholm urban area, though not all:

Stockholm urban area municipalities
Municipality	Population (Year)
Stockholm	1,003,052 (2026)
Botkyrka	97,673 (2026)
Danderyd	32,774 (2026)
Haninge	101,889 (2026)
Huddinge	115,777 (2026)
Järfälla	90,862 (2026)
Nacka	114,700 (2026)
Sollentuna	78,722 (2026)
Solna	87,057 (2026)
Sundbyberg	57,253 (2026)
Tyresö	49,940 (2026)

Stockholm Municipality population development years 1570–2012

=== Suburbs ===
The Stockholm suburbs are places with diverse cultural background. Some areas in the suburbs, including those of Skärholmen, Tensta, Jordbro, Fittja, Husby, Brandbergen, Rinkeby, Rissne, Kista, Hagsätra, Hässelby, Farsta, Rågsved, Flemingsberg, have high percentages of immigrants or second generation immigrants. These mainly come from the Middle East (Assyrian, Turks and Kurds) also Bosnians and Serbs, but there are also immigrants from Africa, Southeast Asia and Latin America. Other parts of the inner suburbs, such as Täby, Danderyd, Lidingö, Solna, Nacka and, as well as some of the suburbs mentioned above, have a majority of ethnic Swedes.

=== Religion ===
The Swedish church consists of 27 parishes in Stockholm with almost 50 churches, but also a large number of churches belonging to the free church.

Stockholm has six mosques.

There are three active synagogues and a community of 4,300 members in Stockholm, which corresponds to 0.4% of Stockholm's population. It is the largest Jewish community in Scandinavia.

== Culture ==
As the capital and largest city of Sweden, Stockholm is the primary centre for the country's cultural life. The Swedish Royal Academies, founded by various monarchs after the sixteenth century, award several prestigious awards and serve as intellectual institutions for the country's leading figures. The city also hosts several of Sweden's architectural masterpieces; the Stockholm region is home to three World Heritage Sites – spots judged as invaluable places that belong to all of humanity: Drottningholm Palace, Skogskyrkogården (The Woodland Cemetery) and Birka. In 1998, Stockholm was named European Capital of Culture.

=== Literature ===
Since its founding, Stockholm has been home to many authors of worldwide recognition; these include figures like August Strindberg and Astrid Lindgren, as well as other writers important to the development of Swedish literature, like Vilhelm Moberg or Olof von Dalin. Stockholm has an active literary life, as it hosts two of Europe's most important literary institutions: the Swedish Academy and National Library of Sweden.

Literature in Stockholm began during the Viking Age, when numerous runestones were carved in the area due to its importance as a trading hub. The Bible was translated into Swedish during the reign of Gustav Vasa, and he drew several writers to his court due to his fondness for both music and literature.

Stockholm's literature first began to flourish in the seventeenth century, with notable writers from the rest of Sweden moving to the city due to the wealth and patronage born from the spoils of the Swedish Empire. This process of cultural advancement continued into the eighteenth century, where the Gustavian era brought Stockholm's literature to its peak. Carl Linnaeus's scientific works were influential literary pieces, with August Strindberg describing Linnaeus as a "poet who happened to become a naturalist". Another notable literary figure from this time is Carl Michael Bellman, with his unique gift for setting his poems to song; he is often considered the father of the Swedish ballad tradition.

The nineteenth and twentieth centuries were also a good time for the literature of Stockholm, with the rise of the Romantic and Realist movements, respectively. August Strindberg rose to prominence in the late nineteenth century with several important works; he is still considered one of Sweden's finest writers. Astrid Lindgren, in the twentieth century, was famous for her children's stories, while Vilhelm Moberg's works are often considered national treasures in Sweden.

=== Architecture ===
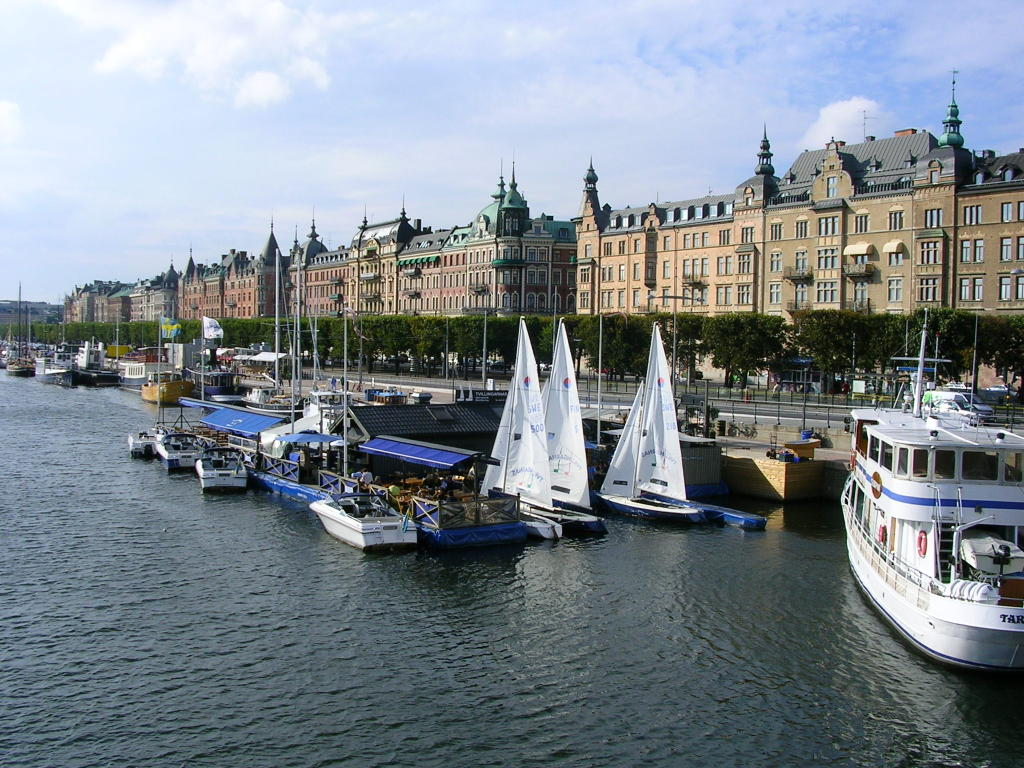
Strandvägen as seen from the island of Djurgården

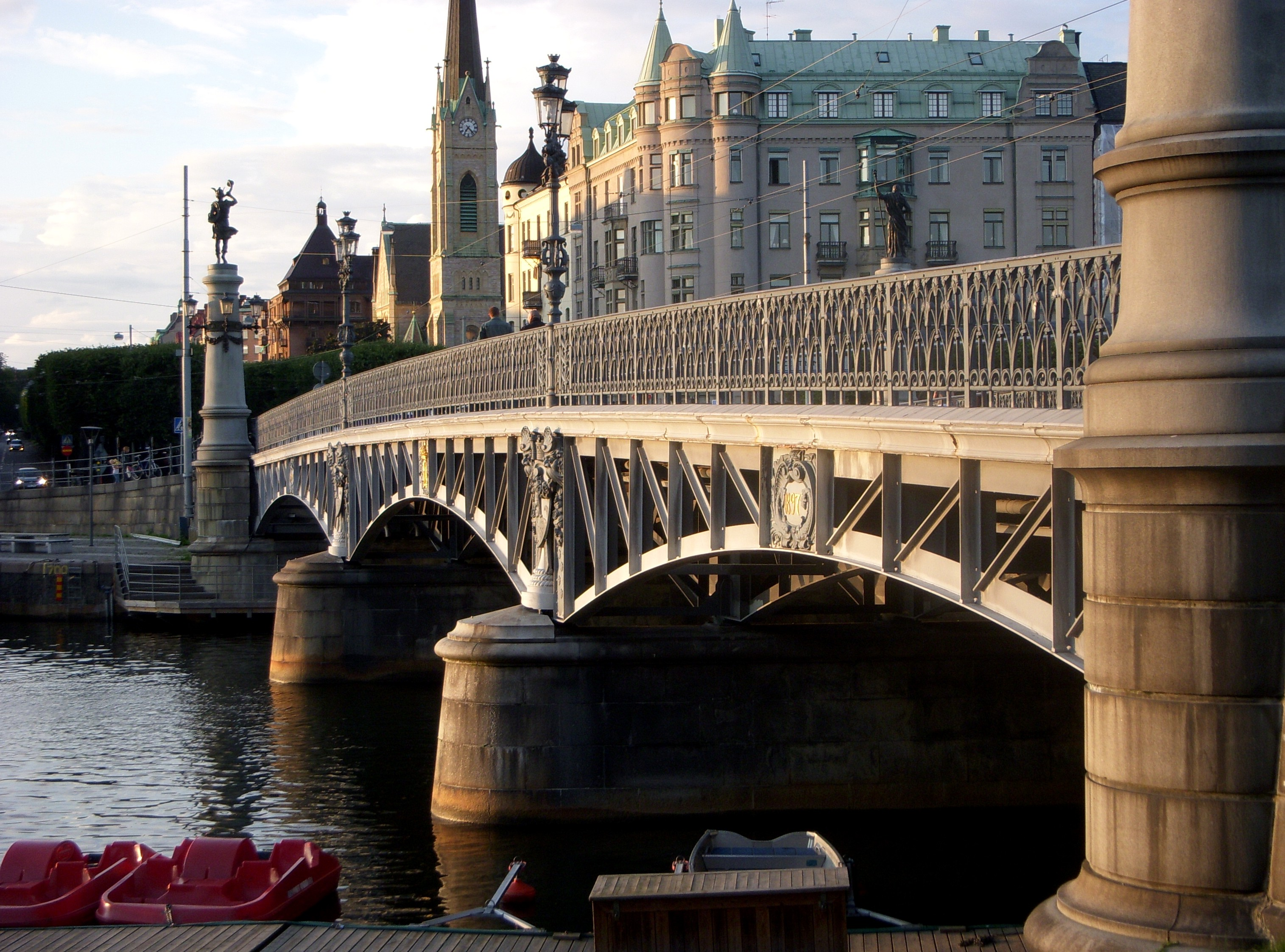
Djurgårdsbron bridge from the large island which is still under direct royal control since the 18th century

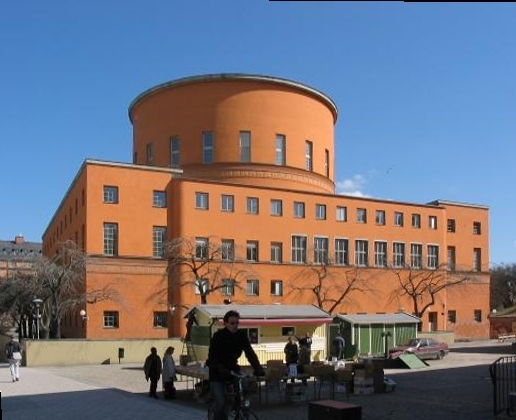
Stockholm Public Library, designed by architect Gunnar Asplund

Stockholm's oldest section is Gamla Stan (Old Town), located on the original small islands of the city's earliest settlements and still featuring the medieval street layout. Some notable buildings of Gamla Stan are the large German Church (Tyska kyrkan) and several mansions and palaces: the House of Nobility (Riddarhuset), the Bonde Palace, the Tessin Palace and the Oxenstierna Palace.

The oldest building in Stockholm is Riddarholmen Church from the late 13th century. After a fire in 1697 when the original medieval castle was destroyed, Stockholm Palace was erected in a baroque style. Storkyrkan Cathedral, the episcopal seat of the Bishop of Stockholm, stands next to the castle. It was founded in the 13th century but is clad in a baroque exterior dating to the 1730–40s.

As early as the 15th century, the city had expanded outside of its original borders. Some pre-industrial, small-scale buildings from this era can still be found in Södermalm. Norrmalm, now the central part of the shopping district of Stockholm, was originally a separate city but was incorporated in Stockholm (now Old Town) during the early 17th century.

Stockholm has had a tradition of applying for building permits in order to erect a building from the early 18th century, with the oldest building permit from 1713. The building permit application tradition is still ongoing; as a consequence, it is possible to trace the continuous history of a newly built house three centuries into the past. Today the Stockholm City Building committee is in charge of the building permit process and their 1713–1978 archive is maintained by Stockholm City Archives. All drawings of old buildings from 1713 to 1874 are digitised and available through the Stockholms City Archives' website.

Stockholm grew rapidly during the age of industrialisation and at the end of the 19th century, with plans and architecture inspired by the large cities of the continent such as Berlin and Vienna. Notable works of this time period include public buildings such as the Royal Swedish Opera and private developments such as the luxury housing developments on Strandvägen.

In the 20th century, a nationalistic push spurred a new architectural style inspired by medieval and renaissance ancestry as well as influences of the Jugend/Art Nouveau style. A key landmark of Stockholm, the Stockholm City Hall, was erected 1911–1923 by architect Ragnar Östberg. Other notable works of these times are the Stockholm Public Library by Gunnar Asplund and the World Heritage Site Skogskyrkogården by Asplund and celebrated architect Sigurd Lewerentz.

In the 1930s modernism characterised the development of the city as it grew. New residential areas sprang up such as the development on Gärdet while industrial development added to the growth, such as the KF manufacturing industries on Kvarnholmen located in the Nacka Municipality. In the 1950s, suburban development entered a new phase, that had already started in the early 1930s, with the introduction of the Stockholm Metro. The modernist developments of Vällingby and Farsta were internationally praised. In the 1960s this suburban development continued but with the aesthetic of the times, the industrialised and mass-produced blocks of flats received considerable criticism.

At the same time that this suburban development was taking place, the most central areas of the inner city were being redesigned, known as Norrmalmsregleringen. Sergels Torg, with its five high-rise office towers was created in the 1960s, followed by the total clearance of large areas to make room for new development projects. The most notable buildings from this period include the ensemble of the House of Culture, City Theatre and the Riksbank at Sergels Torg, designed by architect Peter Celsing. Other celebrated works from the 1960s was S:t Görans Gymnasium (originally built as a school for women, the School of House work and Sewing) by Léonie Geisendorf.

The municipality appointed an official "board of beauty" called "Skönhetsrådet" in 1919 to protect and preserve the beauty of the city, still an active part of the city planning, and architecture debate in the city.

=== Music ===
As the cultural centre of Sweden, Stockholm hosts much of Sweden's influential music industry; the city hosts a variety of musical institutions and many of Sweden's most popular musicians come from Stockholm. Among these are world famous bands like ABBA, as well as more modern musicians like Tim Bergling, more commonly called Avicii. The most prestigious musical institutions in Stockholm include the Royal Swedish Opera and Royal Swedish Academy of Music, both founded in the late eighteenth century. Among Stockholm's most influential musical figures are Carl Michael Bellman, Joseph Martin Kraus and Jenny Lind; the former two were both classical composers, while the latter was one of Europe's most renowned opera singers.

Stockholm first became globally prominent in modern music in the twentieth century with ABBA. Other popular bands and musicians formed in the twentieth century include Roxette and Kent, of which the former was most well known internationally while the latter remained popular in Sweden into the twenty-first century, when they ended the band in 2016.

In the twenty-first century, Stockholm has played host to several influential musicians. Max Martin, who began his career in the late twentieth century, is one of the world's most influential songwriters; he remains based in Stockholm. Other popular modern musicians include Robyn, as well as Eurovision winners Måns Zelmerlöw and Loreen. Allsång på Skansen, Sweden's most prominent music festival, is hosted in Stockholm.

=== Museums ===
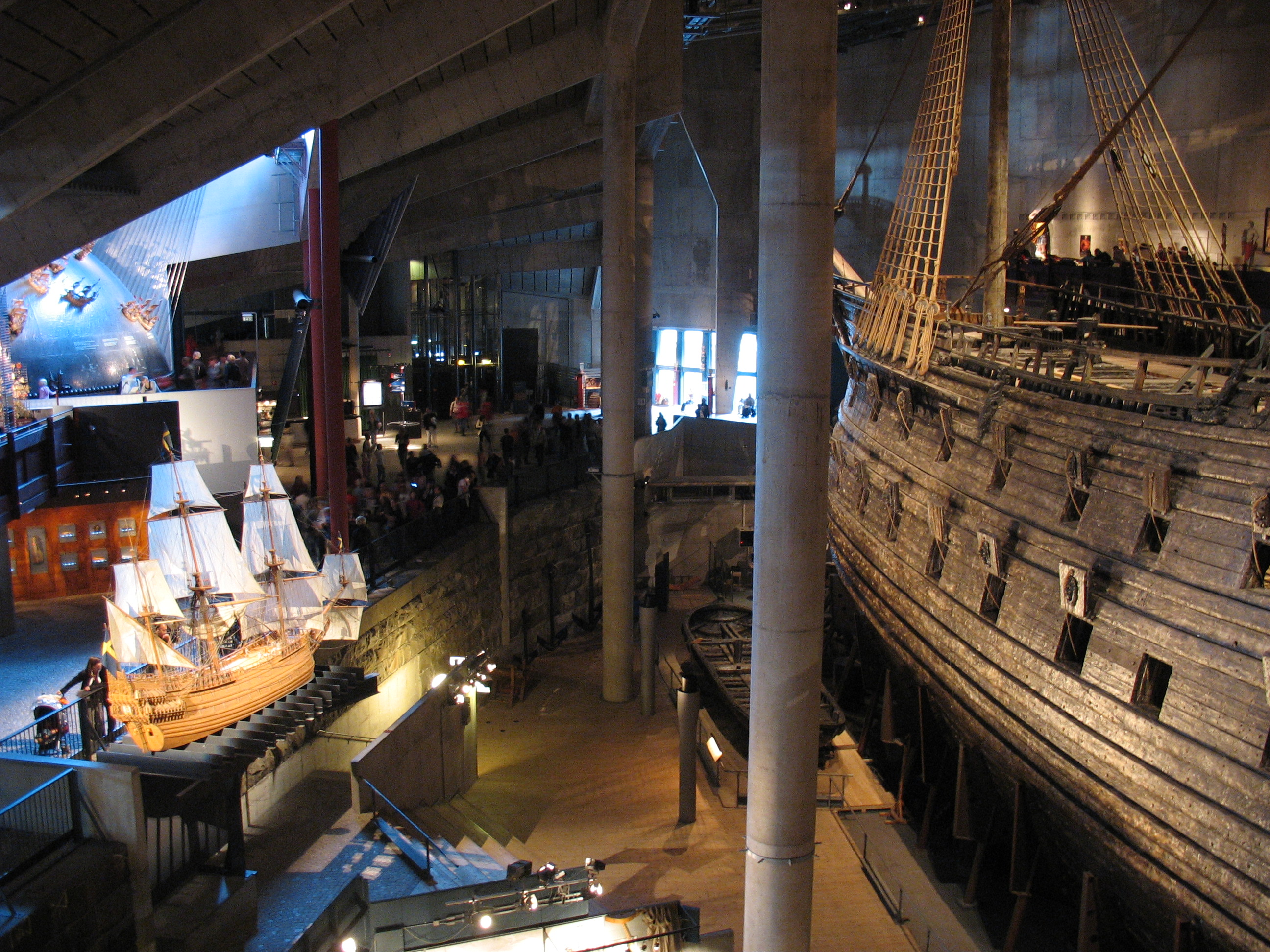
The main hall of the Vasa Museum with a scale model of Vasa as it might have looked on its maiden voyage to the left and the preserved ship itself to the right

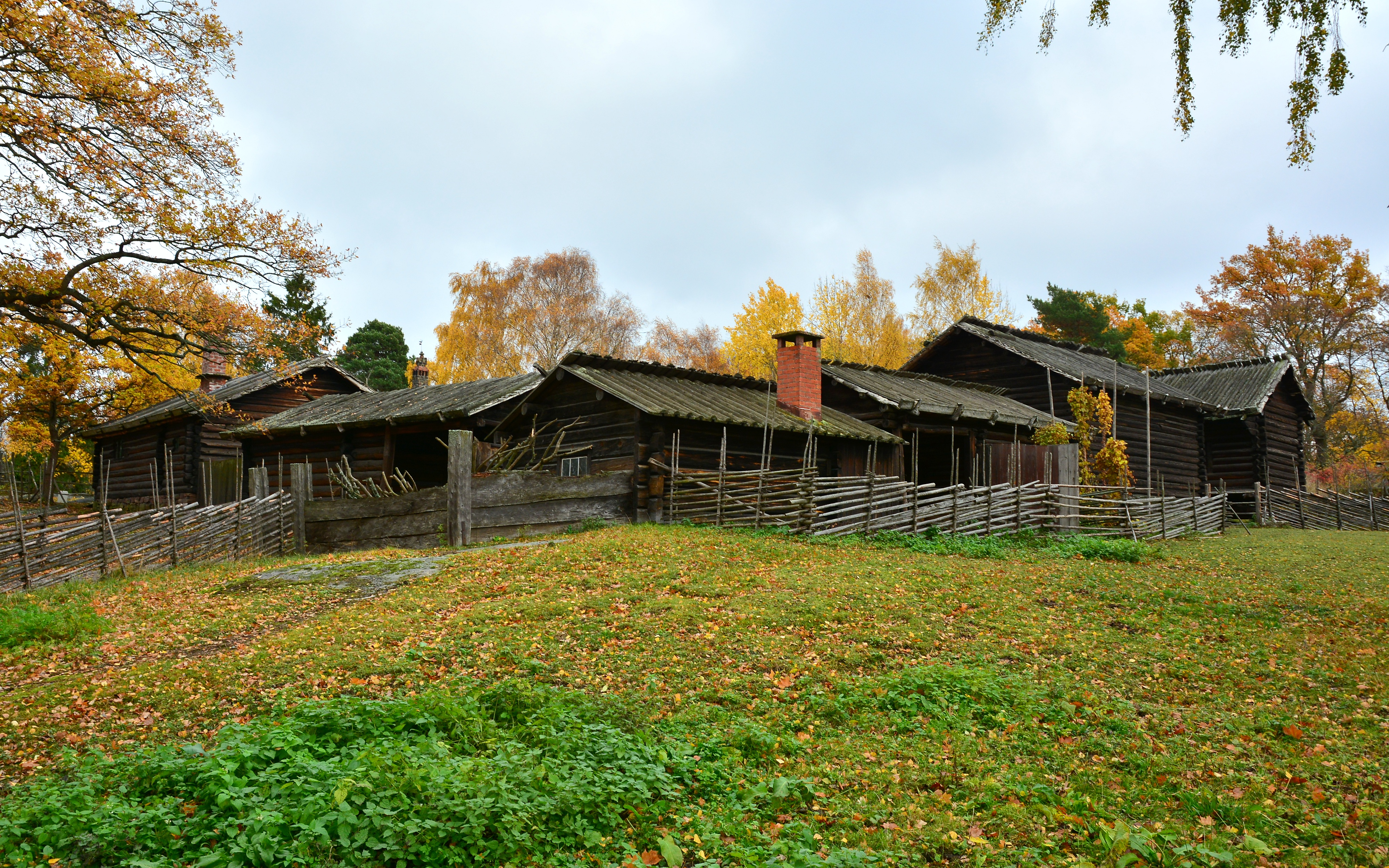
Moragården, one of many historical homesteads at the Skansen open-air museum

Stockholm is one of the most crowded museum-cities in the world with around 100 museums, visited by millions of people every year.

The Vasa Museum (Swedish: Vasamuseet) is a maritime museum on Djurgården which displays the only almost fully intact 17th century ship that has ever been salvaged, the 64-gun warship Vasa that sank on her maiden voyage in 1628.

The Nationalmuseum houses the largest collection of art in the country: 16,000 paintings and 30,000 objects of art handicraft. The collection dates back to the days of Gustav Vasa in the 16th century, and has since been expanded with works by artists such as Rembrandt, and Antoine Watteau, as well as constituting a main part of Sweden's art heritage, manifested in the works of Alexander Roslin, Anders Zorn, Johan Tobias Sergel, Carl Larsson, Carl Fredrik Hill and Ernst Josephson. From the year 2013 to 2018 the museum was closed due to a restoration of the building. Moderna Museet (Museum of Modern Art) is Sweden's national museum of modern art. It has works by noted modern artists such as Picasso and Salvador Dalí.

Skansen (in English: the Sconce) is a combined open-air museum and zoo, located on the island of Djurgården. It was founded in 1891 by Artur Hazelius (1833–1901) to show the way of life in the different parts of Sweden before the industrial era.

Other notable museums (in alphabetical order):

- ABBA: The Museum, an interactive exhibit about the pop-group ABBA
- Birka, The Viking City of Birka Swedish sites on the World Heritage List
- Fotografiska, a contemporary museum of photography, art and culture
- Livrustkammaren, the royal armoury, located at Stockholm Palace
- Maritime Museum, museum for naval history, merchant shipping and shipbuilding
- Medelhavsmuseet, focused on the ancient cultures around the Mediterranean
- Millesgården, home of the sculptor Carl Milles and now a museum of his works
- Museum of Far Eastern Antiquities, mix of art and culture from China, Japan, Korea, India and Southeast Asia
- Nobel Museum, devoted to the Nobel Prize, Nobel laureates, and the founder of the prize, Alfred Nobel (1833–1896)
- Nordic Museum, dedicated to the cultural history and ethnography of Sweden
- Royal Coin Cabinet, dedicated to the history of money and economic history in general
- Skansen, The world's first open-air museum with 150 historic buildings, zoo with Nordic wild and domestic animals
- Stockholm City Museum, a museum of 500 years of Sweden's history
- Swedish Army Museum, Swedish history, from 1500 to the present day with historical objects and realistic scenes
- Swedish History Museum magnificent medieval art and The History of Sweden exhibition which offers encounters
- Swedish Museum of Natural History, Sweden's largest museum about new species and fossils of their predecessors in evolution
- Swedish National Museum of Science and Technology, Sweden's largest museum of technology
- Toy Museum Stockholm, a museum of toys and collectables

=== Art ===
Stockholm has a vibrant art scene with a number of noted art galleries, events and museums. Amongst others, privately sponsored initiatives such as Bonniers Konsthall, Magasin 3, and state-supported institutions such as Tensta Konsthall and Index all show leading international and national artists. A gallery district exists around Hudiksvallsgatan where leading galleries such as Andréhn-Schiptjenko, Brändström & Stene are located. Other important commercial galleries include Nordenhake, Milliken Gallery and Galleri Magnus Karlsson. The Thiel Gallery was founded by financier and collector Ernest Thiel in 1926. The City of Stockholm also has its own art gallery and museum, Liljevalchs konsthall, which hosts a popular spring salon every year with works from professionals and amateurs.

=== Theatre and music ===
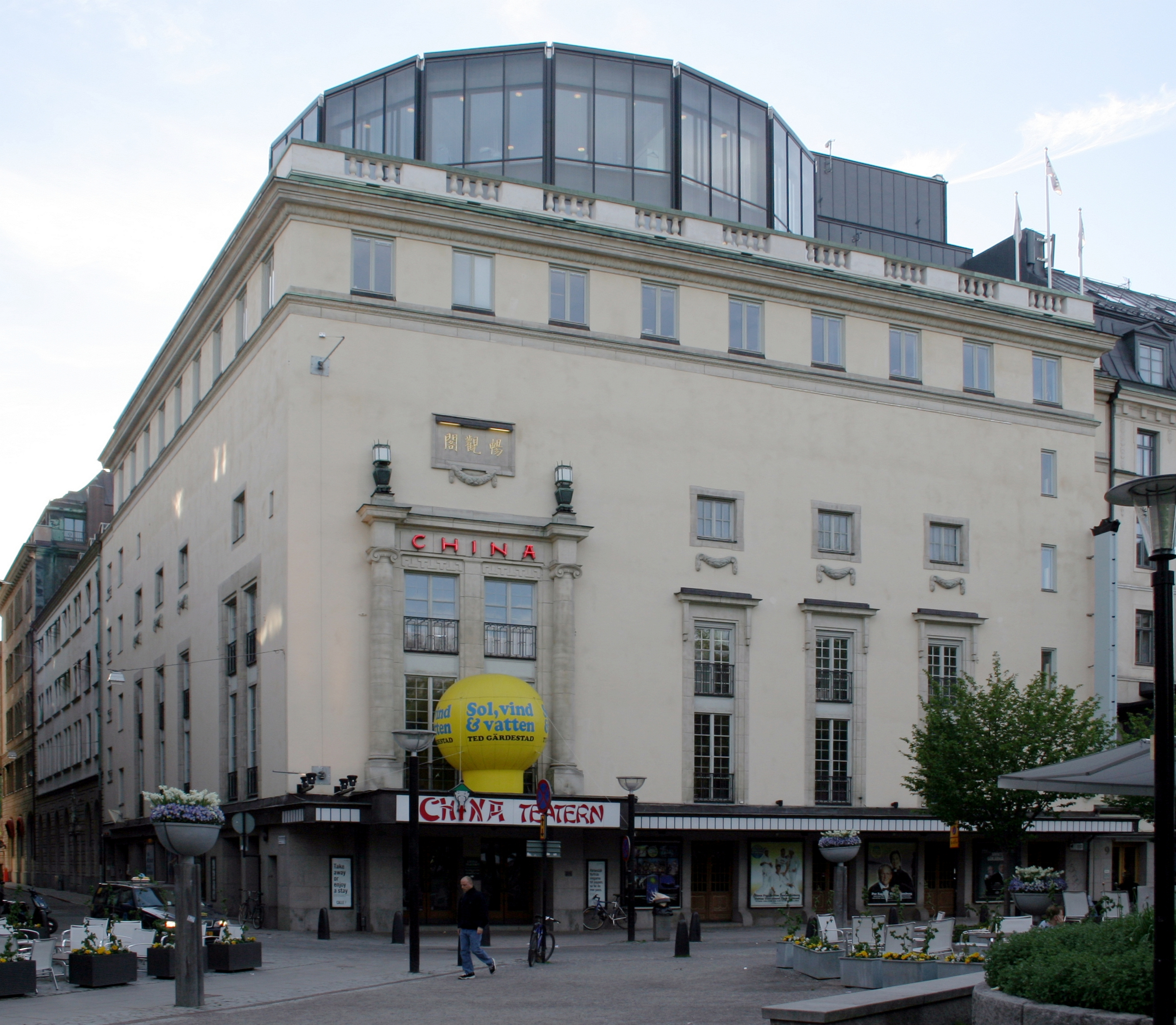
Stockholm's China Theatre

Distinguished among Stockholm's many theatres are the Royal Dramatic Theatre (Kungliga Dramatiska Teatern), one of Europe's most renowned theatres, and the Royal Swedish Opera, inaugurated in 1773.

Other notable theatres are the Stockholm City Theatre (Stockholms stadsteater), the Peoples Opera (Folkoperan), the Modern Theatre of Dance (Moderna dansteatern), the China Theatre, the Göta Lejon Theatre, the Southern Theatre and the Oscar Theatre.

Premises for orchestral music and concerts include Stockholm Concert Hall where for example the yearly awarding ceremony for the Nobel prize is held, and The Berwald hall, home to the National Radio Orchestra.

Stockholm has hosted the Eurovision Song Contest three times, in 1975 at Stockholmsmässan, and in 2000 and 2016 at Globe Arena.

=== Amusement park ===
Gröna Lund is an amusement park located on the island of Djurgården. This amusement park has over 30 attractions and many restaurants. It is a popular tourist attraction and visited by thousands of people every day. It is open from the end of April to the middle of September. Gröna Lund also serves as a concert venue.

=== Media ===
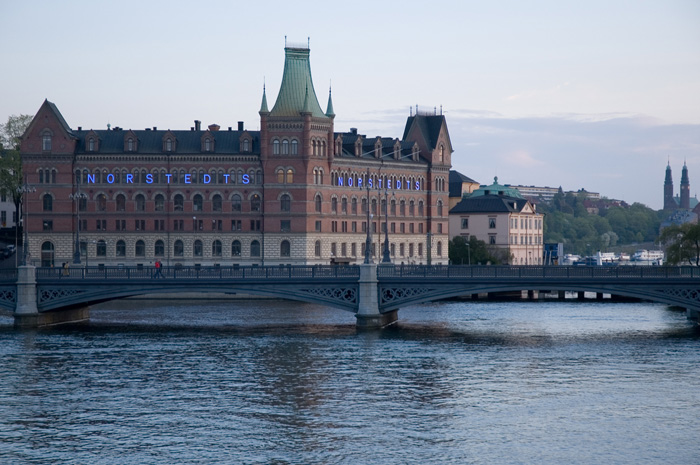
Bookpublisher, Norstedt Building, seen from Vasabron, in Riddarholmen

Stockholm is the media centre of Sweden. It has four nationwide daily newspapers and is also the central location of the publicly funded radio (SR) and television (SVT). In addition, all other major television channels have their base in Stockholm, such as: TV3, TV4 and TV6. All major magazines are also located to Stockholm, as are the largest literature publisher, the Bonnier group. The world's best-selling video game Minecraft was created in Stockholm by Markus 'Notch' Persson in 2009, and its company Mojang is headquartered there.

=== Sports ===
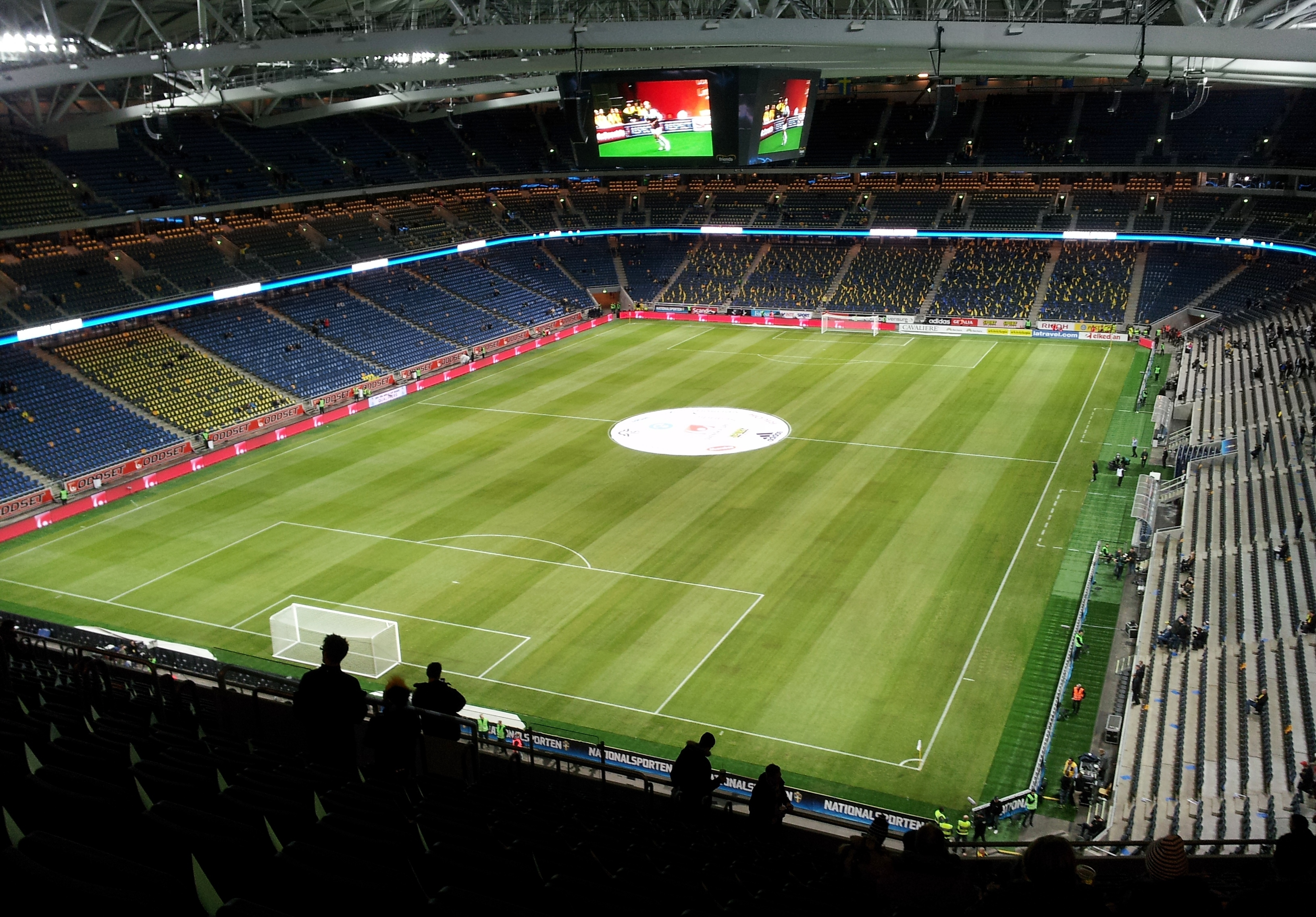
Strawberry Arena

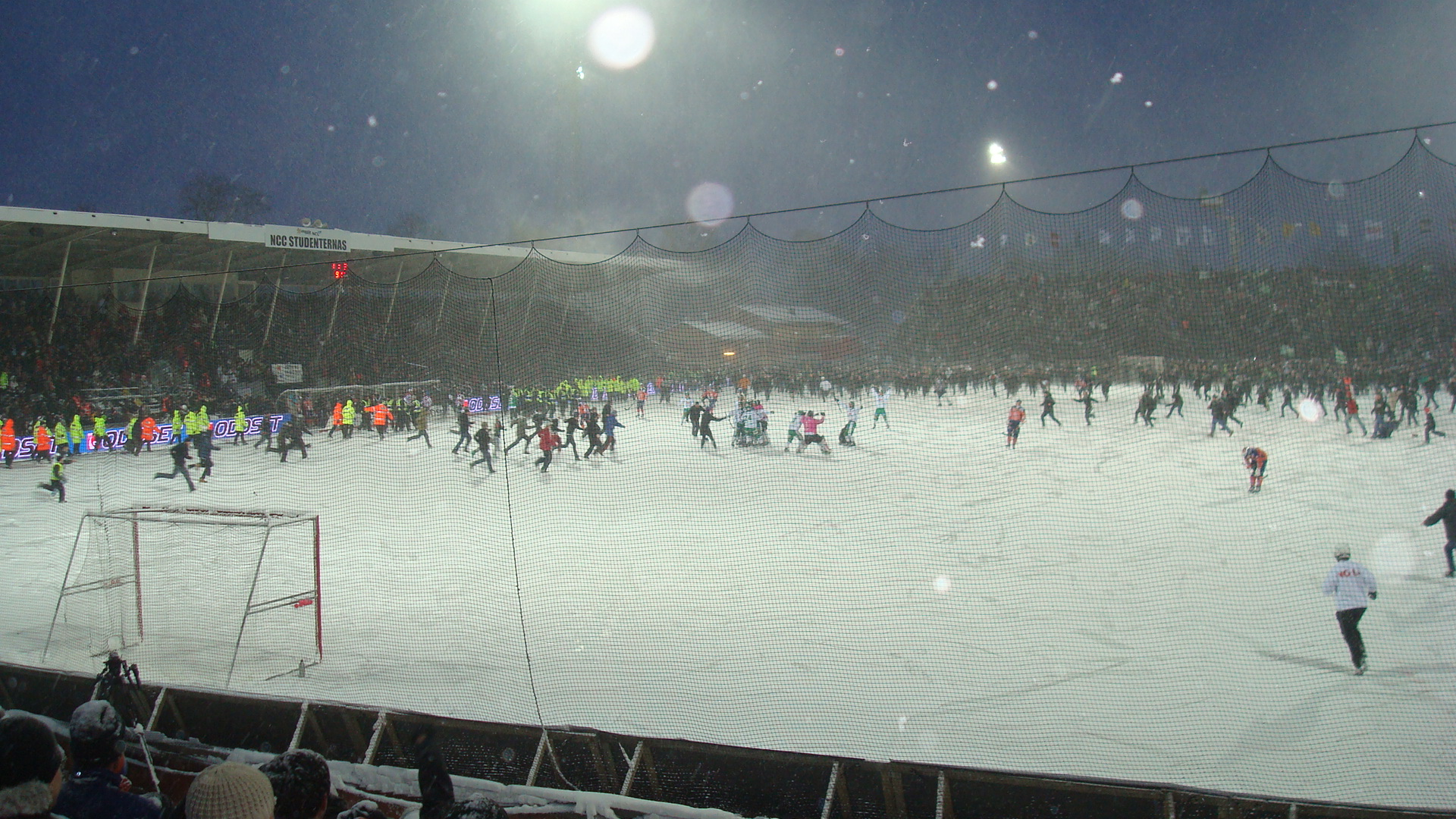
Scenes after Hammarby won their first national bandy title in 2010

The most popular spectator sports are football and ice hockey. The three most popular football clubs in Stockholm are AIK, Djurgårdens IF and Hammarby IF, who all play in the first tier, Allsvenskan. AIK play at Sweden's national stadium for football, Strawberry Arena in Solna, with a capacity of 54,329. The 2017 UEFA Europa League Final was played on 24 May between AFC Ajax and Manchester United at this arena. Manchester United won the trophy after a 2–0 victory.

Djurgårdens IF and Hammarby play at 3Arena in Johanneshov, with a capacity of 30,000 spectators.

All three clubs are multi-sport clubs, which have ice hockey teams; Djurgårdens IF play in the top tier, AIK in the second tier and Hammarby in the third tier, as well as teams in bandy, basketball, floorball and other sports, including individual sports.

Historically, the city was the host of the 1912 Summer Olympics. From those days stem the Stockholms Olympiastadion which has since hosted numerous sports events, notably football and athletics. Other major sports arenas are Strawberry Arena, the new national football stadium, Avicii Arena (colloquially called Globen), a multi-sport arena and one of the largest spherical buildings in the world and the nearby indoor arena Hovet.

Besides the 1912 Summer Olympics, Stockholm hosted the 1956 Summer Olympics Equestrian Games and the UEFA Euro 1992. The city was also second runner up in the 2004 Summer Olympics bids. Stockholm hosted the 1958 FIFA World Cup. Stockholm recently bid jointly with Åre for the 2026 Winter Olympics but lost out to the joint bid of Milan/Cortina d'Ampezzo, Italy, if awarded it would have been the second city to host both Summer and Winter Olympics after Beijing and for the 2026 Winter Paralympics and with Åre it would have also been host to all three winter event including Winter Olympic Games, Winter Paralympic Games and the Special Olympics World Winter Games in which Åre would have host in 2021 along with Östersund, however Sweden pulled out host the Special Olympic World Winter Games 2021 due to lack of funding instead it moved to Kazan, Russia and was delayed to 2022. Stockholm first bid for the Winter Olympics for 2022 Winter Olympics, but withdrew its bid in 2014 due to financial matters.

Stockholm also hosted all but one of the Nordic Games, a winter multi-sport event that predated the Winter Olympics.

In 2015, the Stockholms Kungar Rugby league club was formed. They are Stockholm's first Rugby league team and will play in Sweden's National Rugby league championship.

Every year Stockholm is host to the ÖTILLÖ Swimrun World Championship.

Stockholm has hosted the Stockholm Open, an ATP World Tour 250 series professional tennis tournament annually since 1969. Each year since 1995, the tournament has been hosted at the Kungliga tennishallen.

=== Cuisine ===
Dating back to at least the 1350s, Storkällaren (also called Rådhuskällaren) is Stockholm's oldest known place of business. Swedish 1700s composer and entertainer Carl Michael Bellman was a frequent visitor to the city's taverns, inns and wine cellars. In his poems, Bellman mentioned 113 taverns and inns in and around Stockholm, 30 of which were located in the Gamla Stan.

In 2016, there were 3,315 pubs, cafes and restaurants in the municipality of Stockholm. Among the most famous and acclaimed is the restaurant Operakällaren.

In Stockholm and its surroundings, only two historic eateries remain operating in unbroken succession and in the same location: Stallmästaregården in Solna, dating back to the mid-17th century, and Den Gyldene Freden in Gamla Stan, located at the same address since 1722. "Freden" may thus be the world's oldest continuously existing city pub in the same location.

=== Yearly events and festivals ===
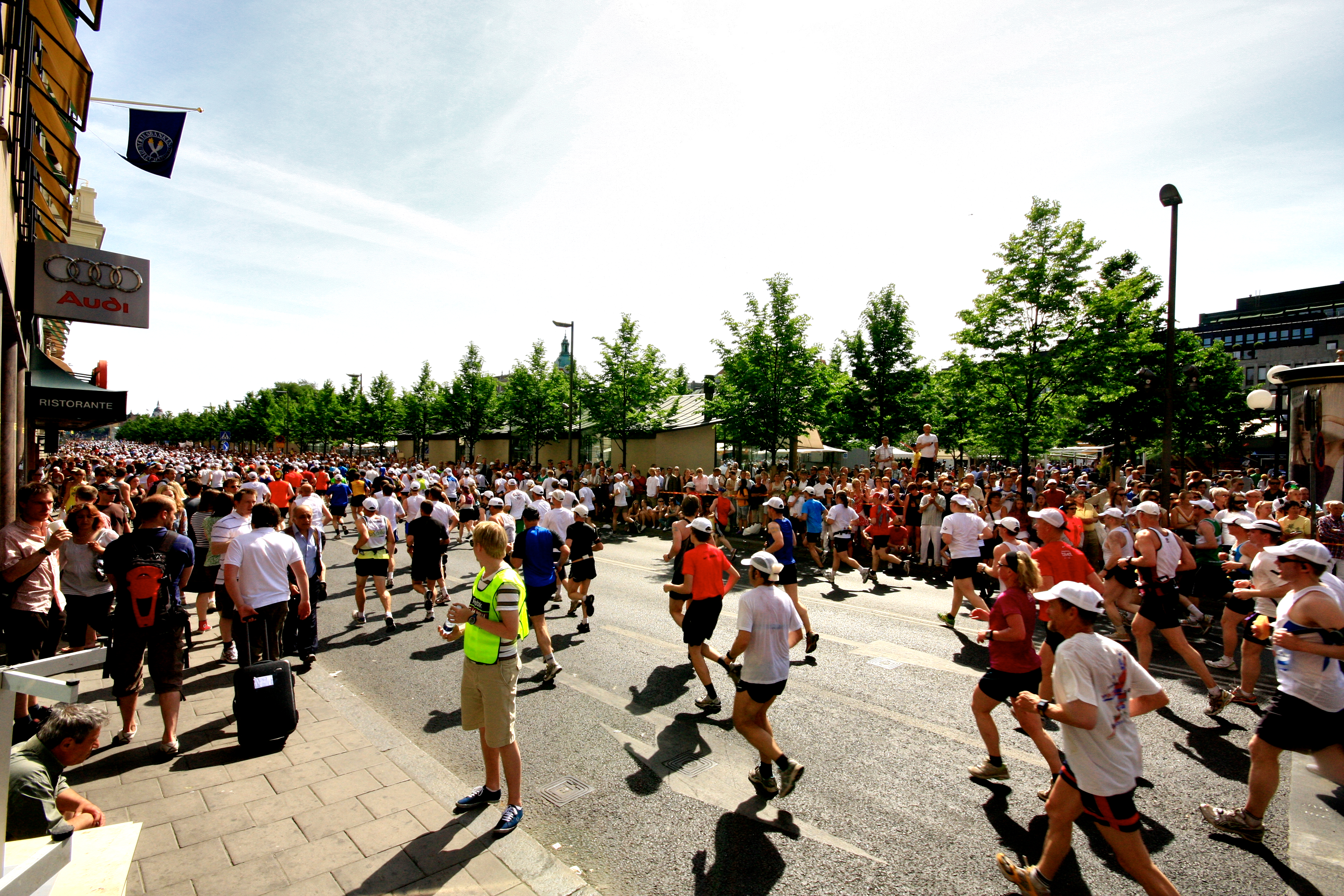
Stockholm Marathon, near Kungsträdgården in 2008

- Stockholm Jazz Festival is one of Sweden's oldest festivals. The festival takes place at Skeppsholmen in July.
- Stockholm Early Music Festival, the largest international event for historical music in the Nordic countries. First week in June since 2002.
- The Stockholm Culture Festival (Stockholms kulturfestival) is a free recurring cultural festival in August, which is held by the City of Stockholm. Runs in parallel with We Are Stockholm.
- We Are Stockholm is a free youth festival intended for people between 13 and 19 years. Runs in parallel with the Stockholm Culture Festival in August and is held by the City of Stockholm. Between 2001 and 2013, the festival went by the name Ung08.
- Stockholm Pride is the largest LGBT Pride event in the Nordic countries and takes place in the last week of July every year. The Stockholm Pride festival always ends with a parade.
- The Stockholm Marathon takes place on a Saturday in early June each year.
- The Nobel Banquet takes place at Stockholm City Hall every year on 10 December.
- The Stockholm Water Festival (Swedish: Vattenfestivalen) was a popular summer festival held annually in Stockholm between 1991 and 1999.
- Manifestation, a yearly ecumenical Christian festival with up to 25,000 participants.
- The Stockholm International Film Festival is an annual film festival held in Stockholm each year since 1990.

== Environment ==
=== Green city with a national urban park ===
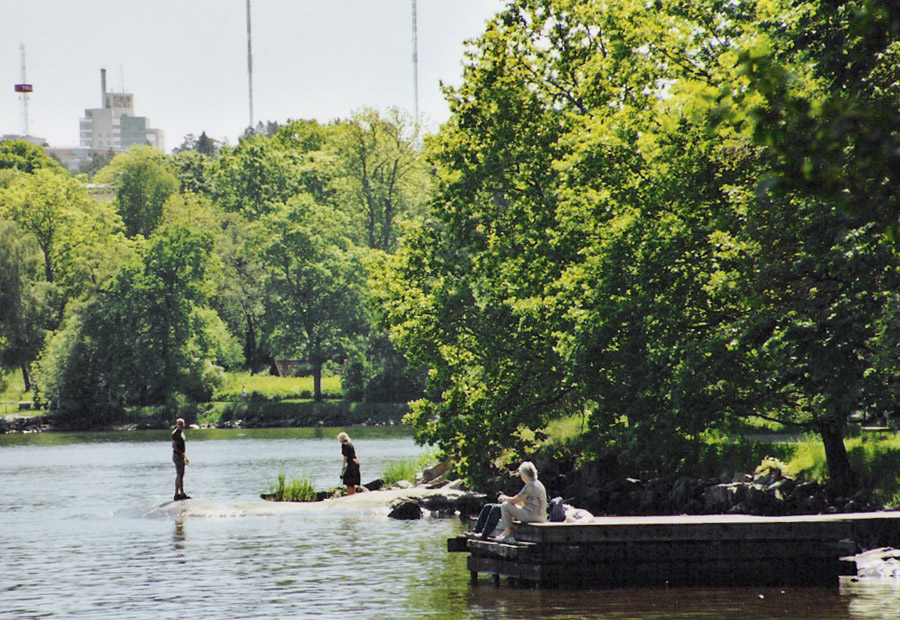
Park on the island of Djurgården in central Stockholm

Stockholm is one of the cleanest capitals in the world. The city was granted the 2010 European Green Capital Award by the EU Commission; this was Europe's first "green capital". Applicant cities were evaluated in several ways: climate change, local transport, public green areas, air quality, noise, waste, water consumption, waste water treatment, sustainable utilisation of land, biodiversity and environmental management. Out of 35 participant cities, eight finalists were chosen: Stockholm, Amsterdam, Bristol, Copenhagen, Freiburg, Hamburg, Münster, and Oslo. Some of the reasons why Stockholm won the 2010 European Green Capital Award were: its integrated administrative system, which ensures that environmental aspects are considered in budgets, operational planning, reporting, and monitoring; its cut in carbon dioxide emissions by 25% per capita in ten years; and its decision towards being fossil fuel free by 2050. Stockholm has long demonstrated concern for the environment. The city's environmental program is the fifth since the first one was established in the mid-1970s. In 2011, Stockholm passed the title of European Green Capital to Hamburg, Germany.

==== Role model ====
At the beginning of 2010, Stockholm launched the program Professional Study Visits in order to share the city's green best practices. The program provides visitors with the opportunity to learn how to address issues such as waste management, urban planning, carbon dioxide emissions, and sustainable and efficient transportation system, among others.

According to the European Cities Monitor 2010, Stockholm is the best city in terms of freedom from pollution. Surrounded by 219 nature reserves, Stockholm has around 1,000 green spaces, which corresponds to 30% of the city's area. Founded in 1995, the Royal National City Park is the world's first legally protected "national urban park". For a description of the formation process, value assets and implementation of the legal protection of The Royal National Urban Park, see Schantz 2006 The water in Stockholm is so clean that people can dive and fish in the centre of the city. The waters of downtown Stockholm serve as spawning grounds for multiple fish species including trout and salmon, though human intervention is needed to keep populations up. Regarding CO_{2} emissions, the government's target is that Stockholm will be CO_{2} free before 2050.

=== Air quality ===
Stockholm used to have problematic levels of particulates (PM10) due to studded winter tires, but by the 2010s they were below limits, after street-specific bans. Nitrogen oxides emitted by diesel vehicles were a problem in the 2010s, but by 2021 they were again below limits, after electric cars had started to replace diesel-driven ones, and pollution regulations for lorries had tightened. As of 2021, the pollutant that exceeds limits is ozone, due to global pollution. In 2021 the average levels for urban background (roof of Torkel Knutssonsgatan on Södermalm) were: NO_{2} 9.7 μg/m^{3}, PM10 9.5 μg/m^{3}, PM2.5 5.1 μg/m^{3}, soot 0.36 μg/m^{3}, ultrafine particles 6100/cm^{3}, SO_{2} 0.4 μg/m^{3}, ozone 53 μg/m^{3}. For urban street level (the densely trafficked Hornsgatan on Södermalm) the average levels were: NO_{2} 23 μg/m^{3}, PM10 17 μg/m^{3}, PM2.5 6.0 μg/m^{3}, soot 0.55 μg/m^{3}.

== Transport ==
=== Public transportation ===
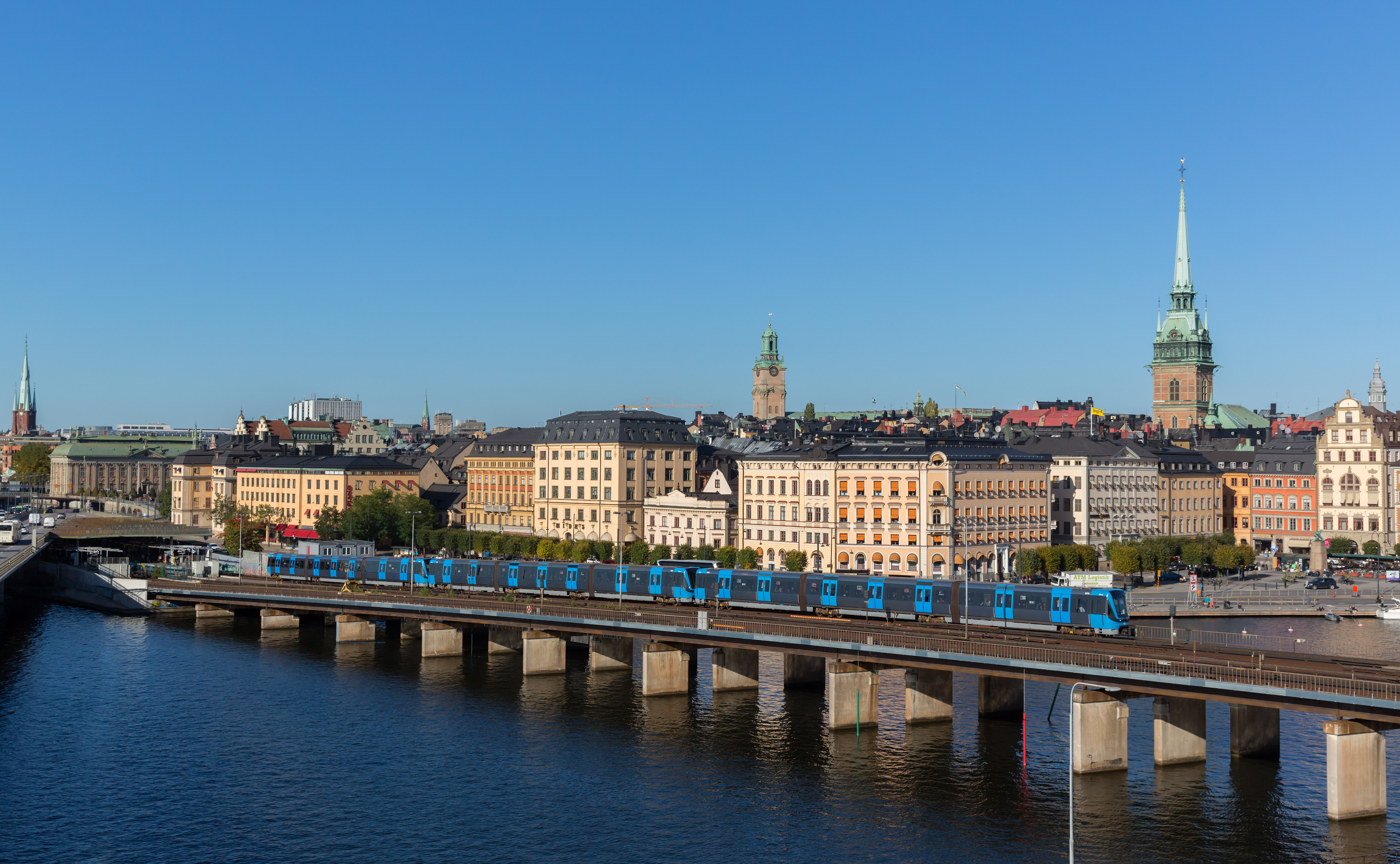
A southbound full-length (3 car) C20 metrotrain departing from the Gamla Stan station

Stockholm has an extensive public transport system. It consists of the Stockholm Metro (Swedish: Tunnelbanan), which consist of three colour-coded main systems (green, red and blue) with seven lines (10, 11, 13, 14, 17, 18, 19); the Stockholm commuter rail (Pendeltåget) which runs on the state-owned railroads on six lines (40, 41, 42, 43, 44, 48); four light rail/tramway lines (7, 12, 21, and 22); the 891 mm narrow-gauge railway Roslagsbanan, on three lines (27, 28, 29) in the northeastern part; the local railway Saltsjöbanan, on two lines (25, 26) in the southeastern part; a large number of bus lines, and the inner-city Djurgården ferry. The overwhelming majority of the land-based public transport in Stockholm County (save for the airport buses/airport express trains and other few commercially viable bus lines) is organized under the common umbrella of Storstockholms Lokaltrafik (SL), an aktiebolag wholly owned by Stockholm County Council. Since the 1990s, the operation and maintenance of the SL public transport services are contracted out to independent companies bidding for contracts, such as MTR, which operates the Metro. The archipelago boat traffic is handled by Waxholmsbolaget, which is also wholly owned by the County Council.

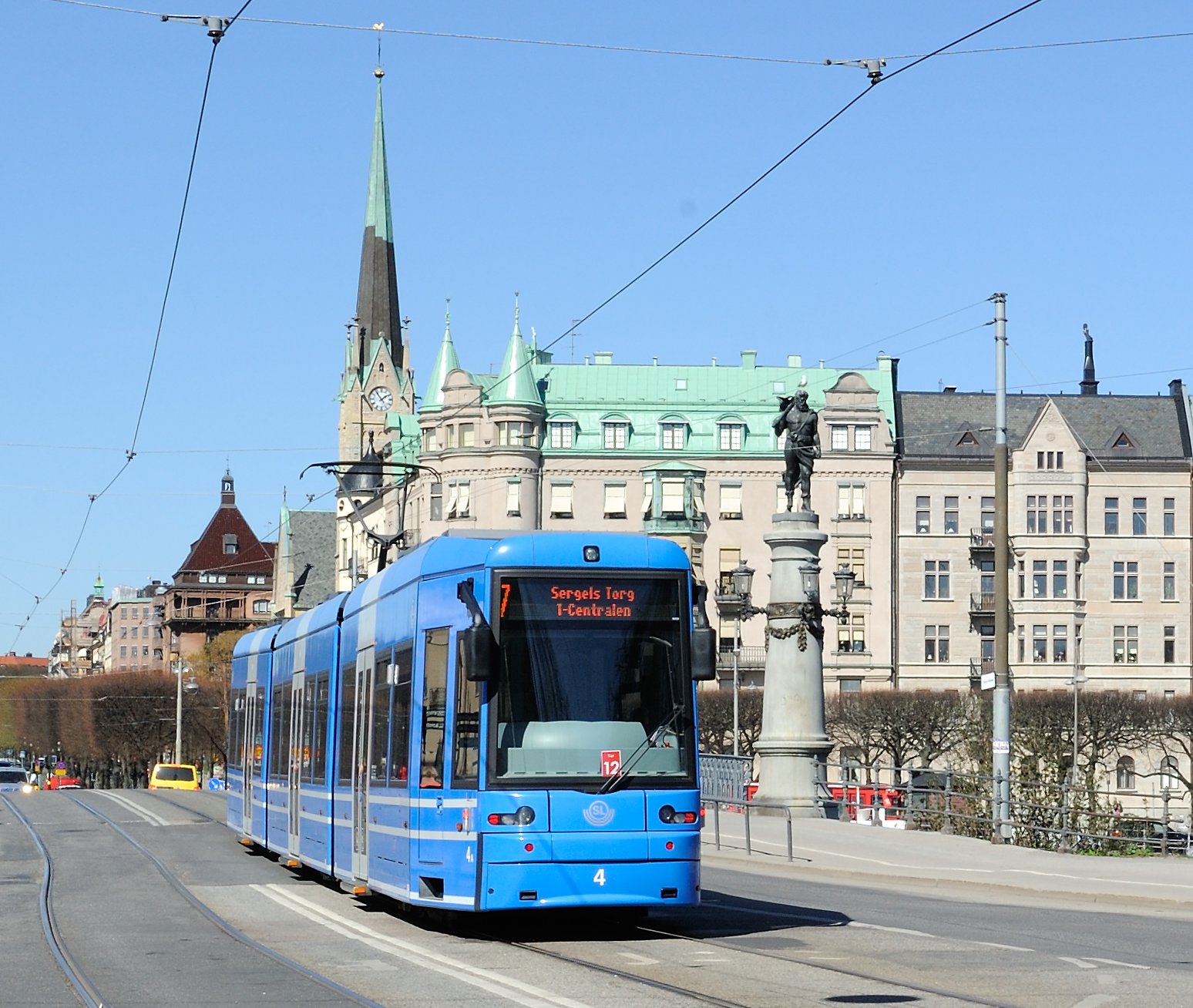
An A34 tram on line 7 at Djurgårdsbron

SL has a common ticket system in the entire Stockholm County, which allows for easy travel between different modes of transport. The tickets are of two main types, single ticket and travel cards, both allowing for unlimited travel with SL in the entire Stockholm County for the duration of the ticket validity. Between 2007 and 2017, a zone system (A, B, C) and price system were used. As of 2026, single journey tickets, valid for 75 minutes, cost SEK 43 and were available through the use of contactless payment cards, a dedicated app or at an SL ticket office. Travel cards were available from 24 hours up to a year. Tickets of all these types were available with reduced prices for students and persons under 20 and over 65 years of age.

==== The City Line Project ====
With an estimated cost of SEK 16.8 billion (January 2007 price level), which equals 2.44 billion US dollars, the City Line, an environmentally certified project, comprises a 6 km (3.7 mi)-long commuter train tunnel (in rock and water) beneath Stockholm, with two new stations (Stockholm City and Stockholm Odenplan), and a 1.4 km (0.87 mi)-long railway bridge at Årsta. The City Line was built by the Swedish Transport Administration in co-operation with the City of Stockholm, Stockholm County Council, and Stockholm Transport, SL. As Stockholm Central Station is overloaded, the purpose of this project was to double the city's track capacity and improve service efficiency. Operations began in July 2017.

Between Riddarholmen and Söder Mälarstrand, the City Line runs through a submerged concrete tunnel. As a green project, the City Line includes the purification of waste water; noise reduction through sound-attenuating tracks; the use of synthetic diesel, which provides users with clean air; and the recycling of excavated rocks.

=== Roads ===
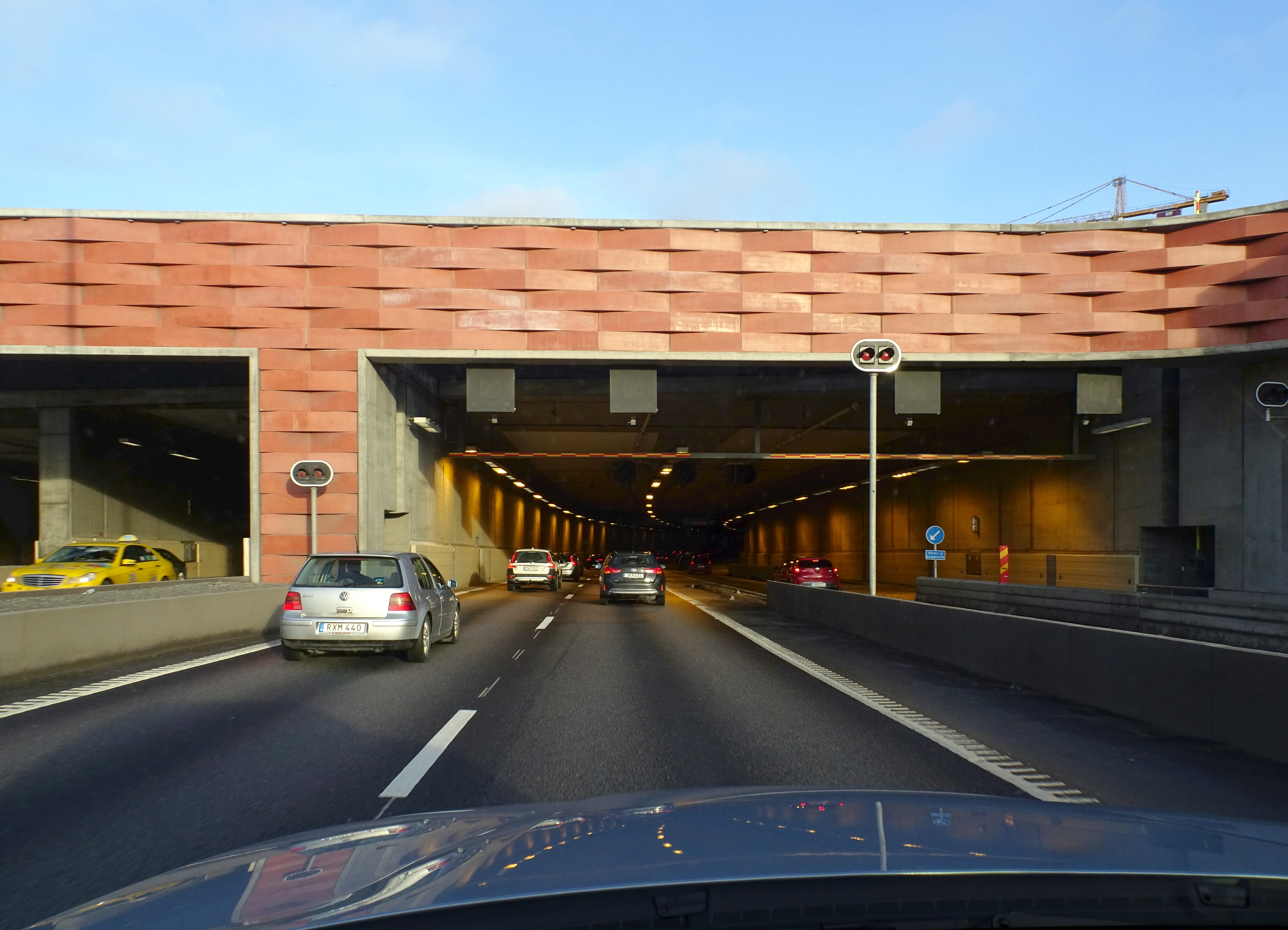
Norra länken (North link) motorway in Stockholm

Stockholm is at the junction of the European routes E4, E18 and E20. A half-completed motorway ring road exists on the south, west and north sides of the City Centre. The northern section of the ring road, Norra Länken, opened for traffic in 2015 while the final subsea eastern section is being discussed as a future project. A bypass motorway for traffic between Northern and Southern Sweden, Förbifart Stockholm, is being built. The many islands and waterways make extensions of the road system both complicated and expensive, and new motorways are often built as systems of tunnels and bridges.

==== Congestion charges ====
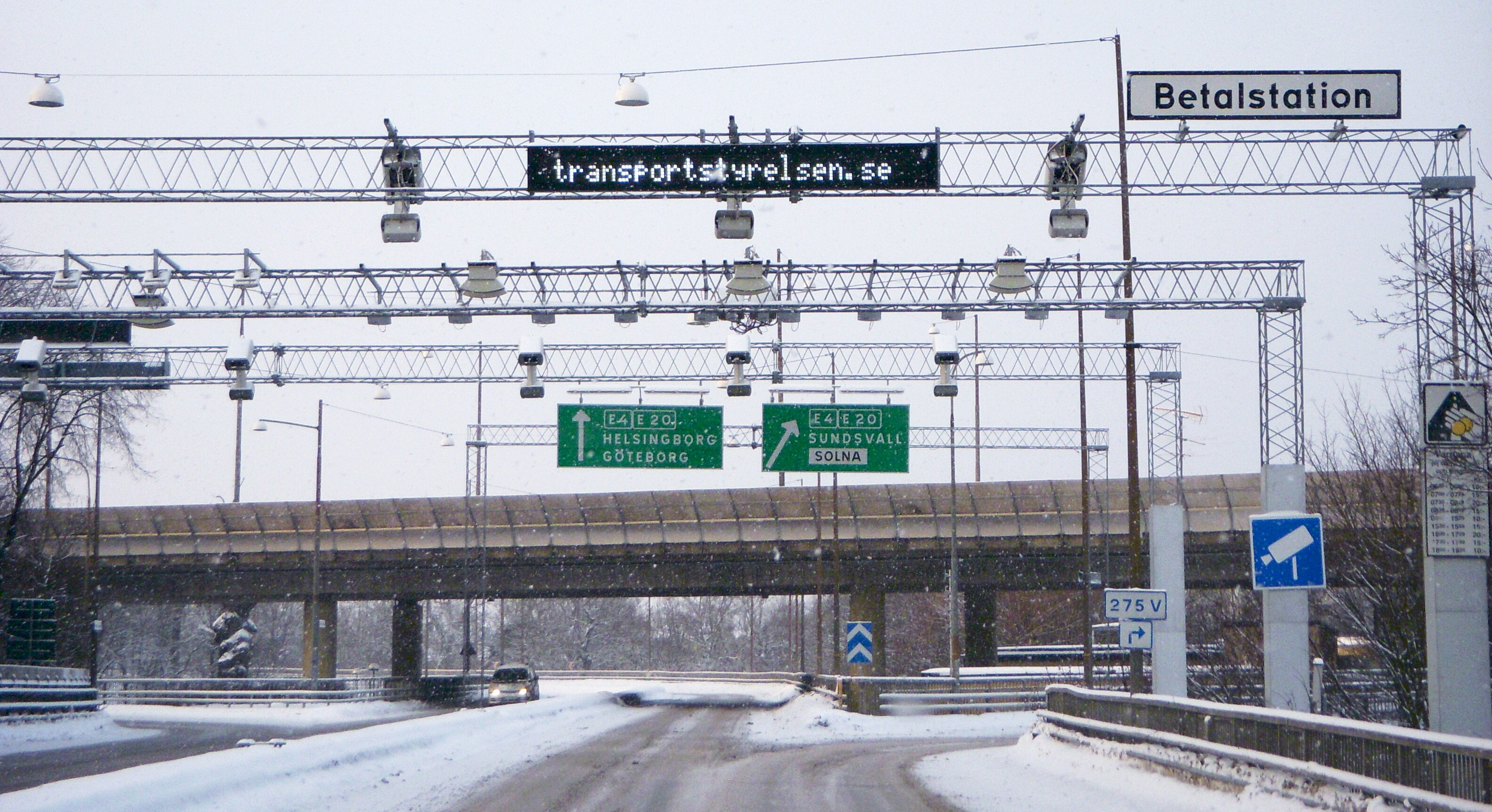
A control point for the congestion charge leading up to Essingeleden

Stockholm has a congestion pricing system, the Stockholm congestion tax, in use on a permanent basis since 1 August 2007, after having had a seven-month trial period in the first half of 2006. The City Centre is within the congestion tax zone. All the entrances and exits of this area have unmanned control points operating with automatic number plate recognition. All vehicles entering or exiting the congestion tax affected area, with a few exceptions, have to pay 10–20 SEK (1.09–2.18 EUR, 1.49–2.98 USD) depending on the time of day between 06:30 and 18:29. The maximum tax amount per vehicle per day is SEK 60 (EUR 6.53). Payment is done by various means within 14 days after one has passed one of the control points; one cannot pay at the control points.

After the trial period was over, consultative referendums were held in Stockholm Municipality and several other municipalities in Stockholm County. The then-reigning government (Persson Cabinet) stated that they would only take into consideration the results of the referendum in Stockholm Municipality. The opposition parties (Alliance for Sweden) stated that if they were to form a cabinet after the general election—which was held the same day as the congestion tax referendums—they would take into consideration the referendums held in several of the other municipalities in Stockholm County as well. The results of the referendums were that the Stockholm Municipality voted for the congestion tax, while the other municipalities voted against it. The opposition parties won the general election and a few days before they formed government (Reinfeldt Cabinet) they announced that the congestion tax would be reintroduced in Stockholm, but that the revenue would go entirely to road construction in and around Stockholm. During the trial period and according to the agenda of the previous government the revenue went entirely to public transport.

=== Ferries ===
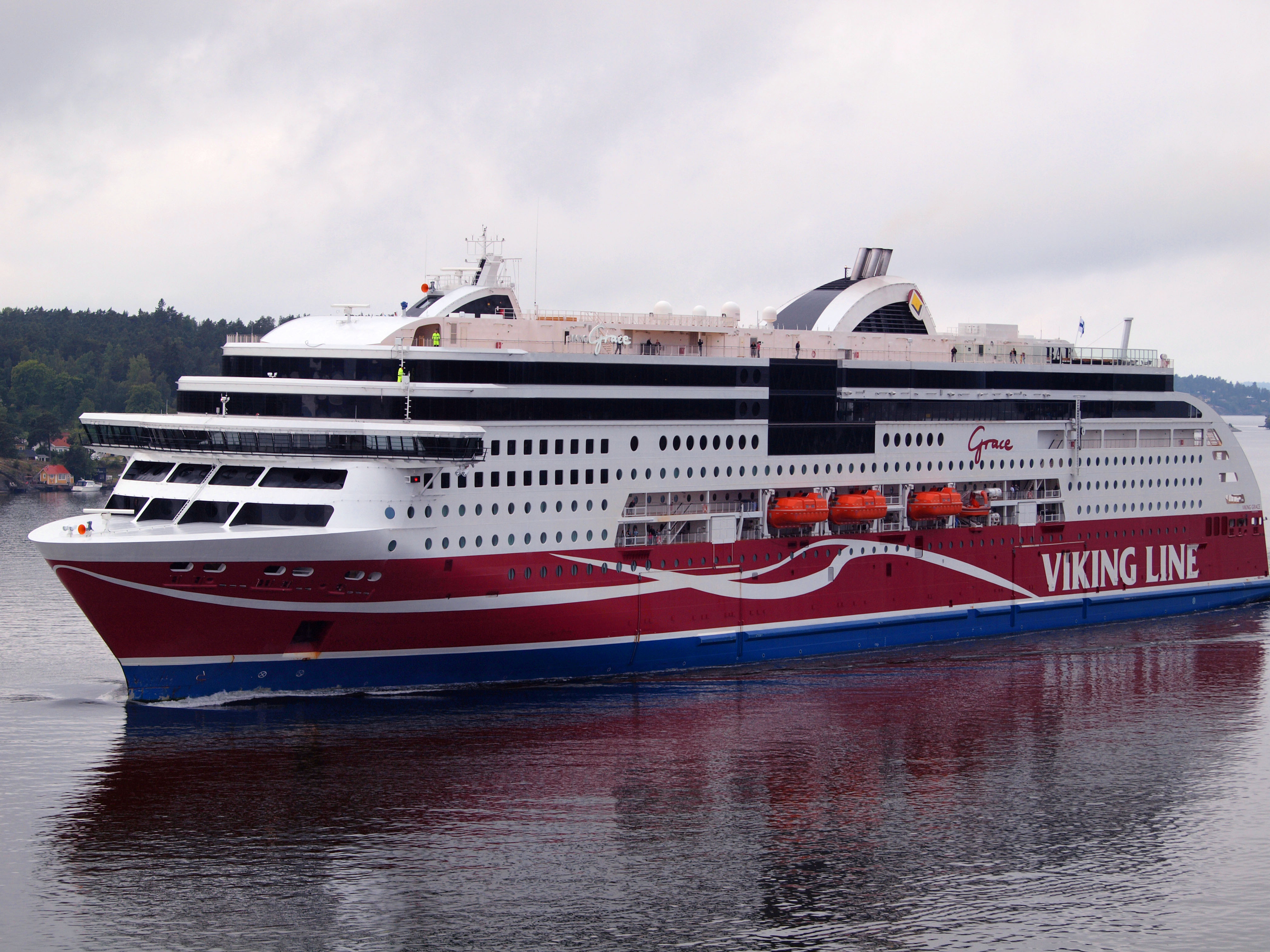
Viking Grace, one of many cruiseferries on the routes to Finland and Åland

Stockholm has regular ferry lines to Helsinki and Turku in Finland (commonly called Finlandsfärjan); Mariehamn, Åland and Tallinn, Estonia. The large Stockholm archipelago is served by the archipelago boats of Waxholmsbolaget (owned and subsidized by Stockholm County Council). Additionally, there are many for-profit private companies offering tours and regular service in the archipelago.

=== City bikes ===
Starting with 2008, Stockholm City Bikes were available to rent between April and October, by purchasing a bike card online or through retailers. Bikes could be picked up from and returned to any Stockholm City Bikes stand across the city, and used for up to three hours per loan. In 2022, the regular bikes were replaced with electric bikes, but the service was discontinued in 2023, amid technical issues, poor availability, high costs and disputes between the city and the service provider. As of 2026, electric bikes and scooters are available from private providers Bolt and Voi.

=== Airports ===
Map showing the locations of airports around Stockholm
- International and domestic:
  - Stockholm Arlanda Airport (IATA: ARN, ICAO: ESSA) is the largest and busiest airport in Sweden with 27 million passengers in 2017. It is located about 40 km (25 mi) north of Stockholm and serves as a hub for Scandinavian Airlines.
  - Stockholm Bromma Airport (IATA: BMA, ICAO: ESSB) is located about 8 km (5.0 mi) west of Stockholm, also serves as a hub for BRA (Braathens Regional Airlines).
- Only international:
  - Stockholm Skavsta Airport (IATA: NYO, ICAO: ESKN) is located 108 km (67 mi) south of Stockholm. It is located 5 km (3 mi) away from Södermanland County capital Nyköping.
  - Stockholm Västerås Airport (IATA: VST, ICAO: ESOW) is located 103 km (64 mi) west of Stockholm, in the city of Västerås.

The Arlanda Express airport rail link runs between Arlanda Airport and Stockholm Central Station. With a journey length of 20 minutes, the train ride is the fastest way of travelling to the city centre. Arlanda Central Station is also served by commuter, regional and intercity trains.

Additionally, there are also bus lines, called Flygbussarna (lit. 'the airport buses'), that run between central Stockholm and all the airports.

As of 2010 there are no airports specifically for general aviation in the Stockholm area.

=== Inter-city trains ===
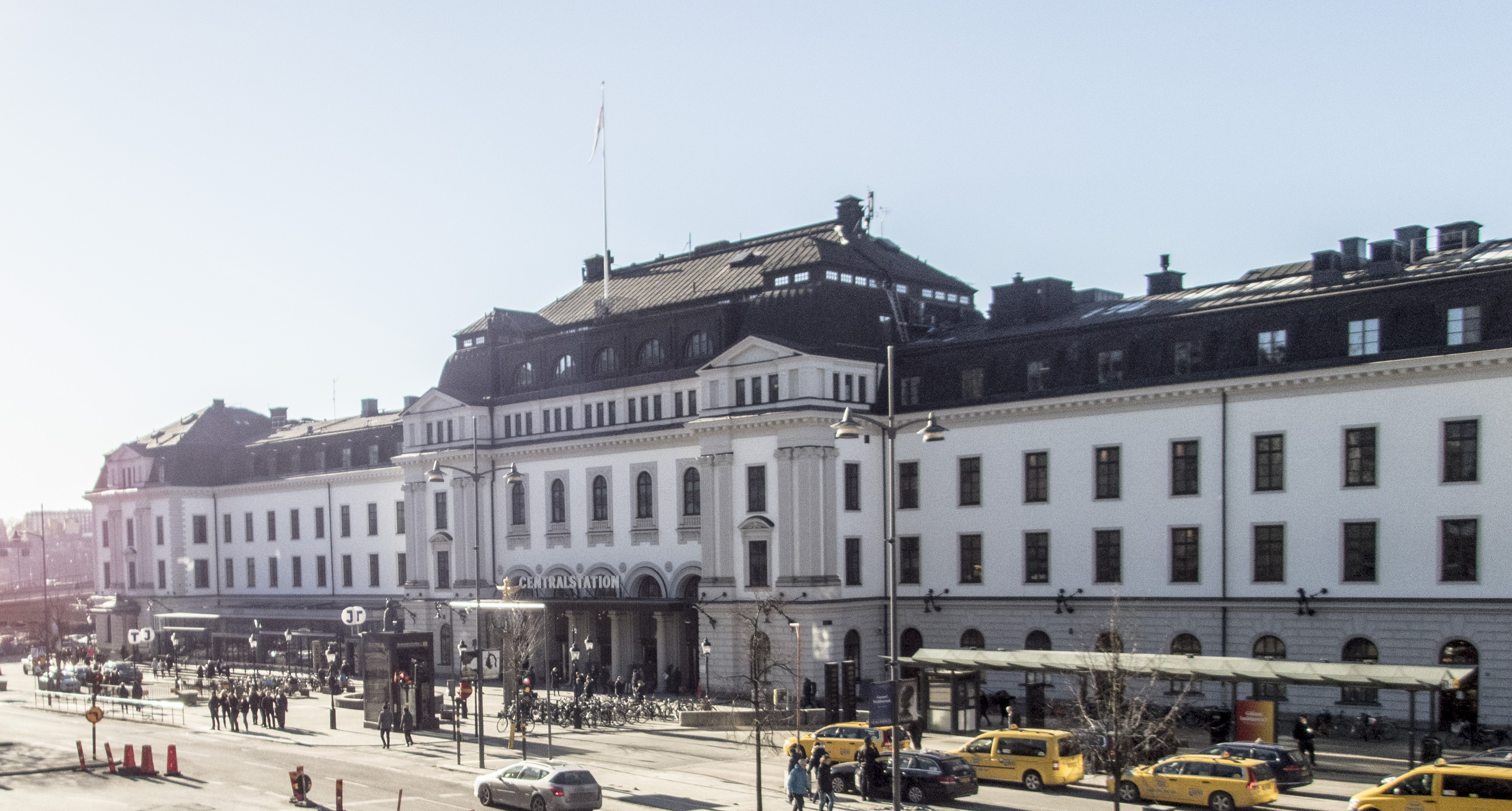
Stockholm Central Station

Stockholm Central Station has train connections to many Swedish cities as well as to Oslo, Norway, Copenhagen, Denmark and Hamburg, Germany. The popular X 2000 service to Gothenburg takes three hours. Most of these trains are run by SJ AB.

== International rankings ==
Stockholm often performs well in international rankings, some of which are mentioned below:

- In the book The Ultimate Guide to International Marathons (1997), written by Dennis Craythorn and Rich Hanna, Stockholm Marathon is ranked as the best marathon in the world.
- In the 2006 European Innovation Scoreboard, prepared by the Maastricht Economic Research Institute on Innovation and Technology (MERIT) and the Joint Research Centre's Institute for the Protection and the Security of the Citizen of the European Commission, Stockholm was ranked as the most innovative city in Europe.
- In the 2008 World Knowledge Competitiveness Index, published by the Centre for International Competitiveness, Stockholm was ranked as the sixth most competitive region in the world and the most competitive region outside the United States.
- In the 2006 European Regional Growth Index (E-REGI), published by Jones Lang LaSalle, Stockholm was ranked fifth on the list of European cities with the strongest GDP growth forecast. Stockholm was ranked first in Scandinavia and second outside Central and Eastern Europe.
- In the 2007 European Cities Monitor, published by Cushman & Wakefield, Stockholm was ranked as the best Nordic city to locate a business. In the same report, Stockholm was ranked first in Europe in terms of freedom from pollution.
- In a 2007 survey performed by the environmental economist Matthew Kahn for the Reader's Digest magazine, Stockholm was ranked first on its list of the "greenest" and most "livable" cities in the world.
- In a 2008 survey published by Reader's Digest magazine, Stockholm was ranked fourth in the world in its list of the "world's top ten honest cities".
- In a 2008 survey published by the National Geographic Traveler magazine, Gamla Stan (the Old Town) in Stockholm was ranked sixth on its list of rated historic places.
- In a 2008 survey published by the Foreign Policy magazine, Stockholm was ranked twenty-fourth on its list of the world's most global cities.
- In 2009, Stockholm was awarded the title as European Green Capital 2010, as the first Green capital ever in the European Green Capital Award scheme.
- In 2013, Stockholm was named the 8th most competitive city in the world by the Economist Intelligence Unit.
- In 2016, Stockholm was one of the cities with the most unicorn companies in the world.
- In 2019, Stockholm was awarded the World Smart City Award in the city category for its leadership of the European Smart Cities and Communities project GrowSmarter.

== Twin cities and towns ==
Stockholm does not have any formal twin cities.

== See also ==
- Holmium — a chemical element named after Stockholm
- List of people from Stockholm
- Outline of Stockholm
- Ports of the Baltic Sea
- Stockholm syndrome
