= Stockholm Municipality =

Stockholm Municipality Stockholms kommun
- Municipality
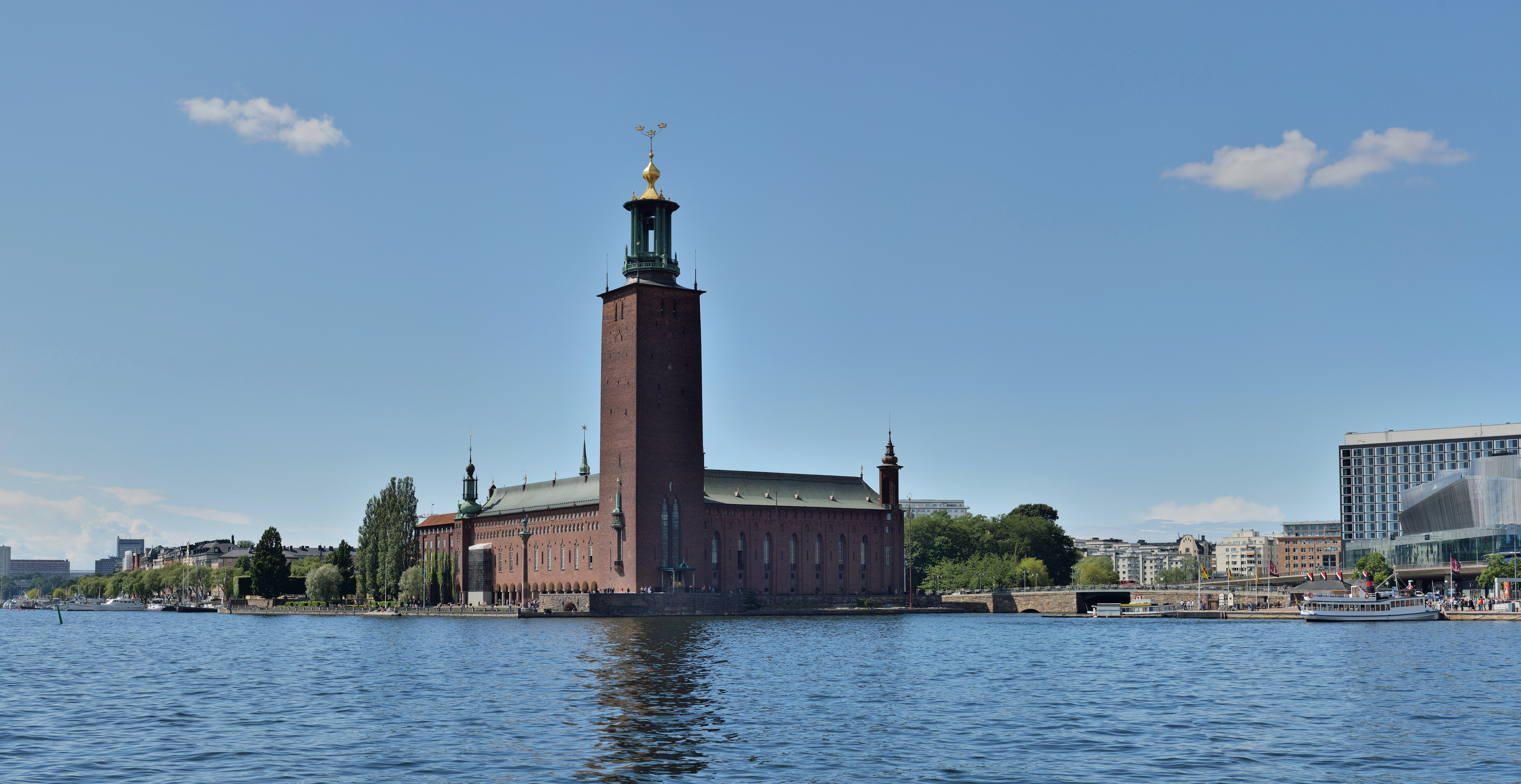
- Stockholm City Hall

- Coat of arms Logotype

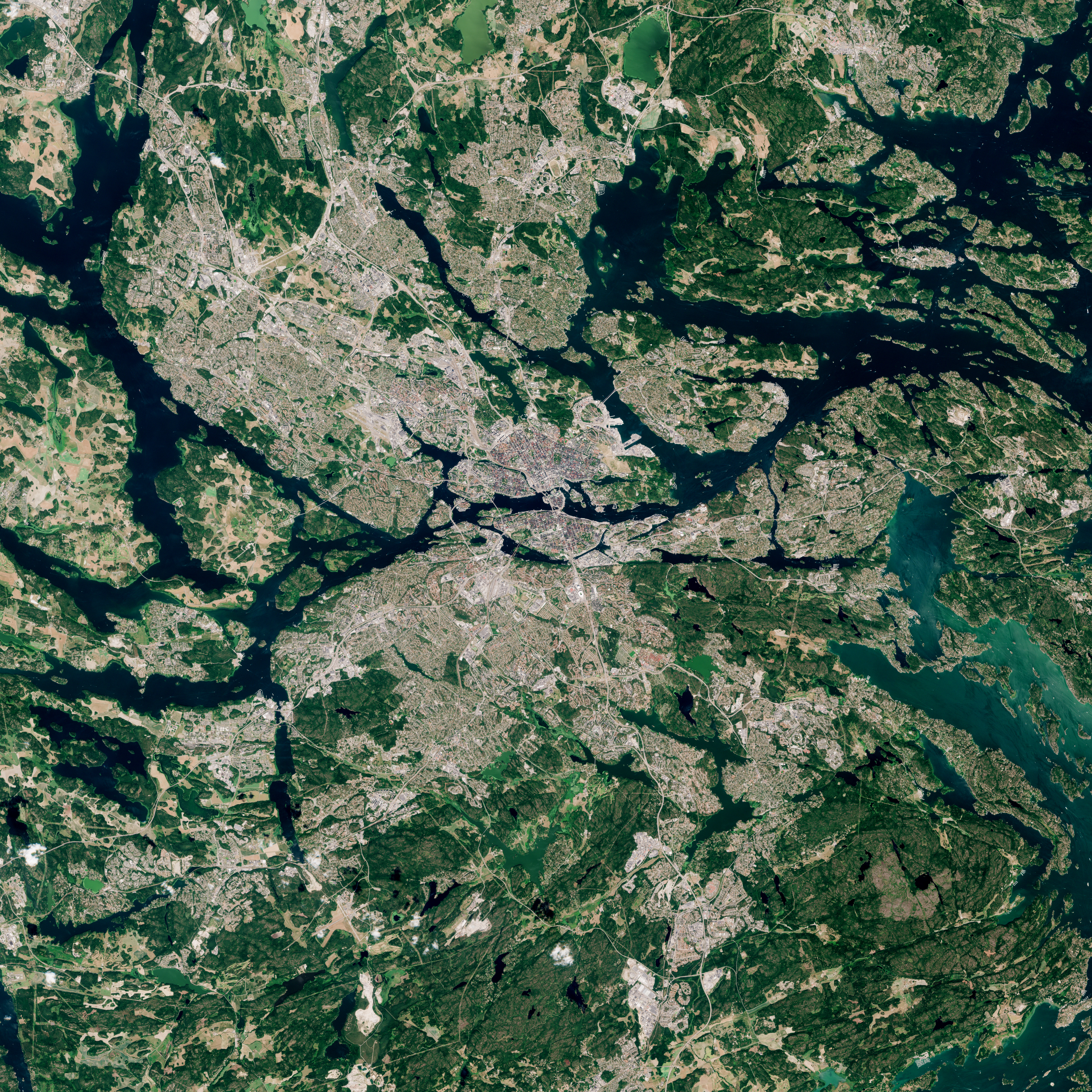
- Coordinates: 59°21′N 18°04′E
- Country: Sweden
- County: Stockholm County
- Seat: Stockholm

Government
  - Mayor: Emilia Bjuggren (Social Democrats)

Area
  - Total: 214.63 km^{2} (82.87 sq mi)
  - Land: 187.17 km^{2} (72.27 sq mi)
  - Water: 27.46 km^{2} (10.60 sq mi)
- Area as of 1 January 2014.

Population (30 June 2025)
  - Total: 996,264
  - Density: 5,322.8/km^{2} (13,786/sq mi)
- Time zone: UTC+1 (CET)
  - Summer (DST): UTC+2 (CEST)
- ISO 3166 code: SE
- Province: Uppland and Södermanland
- Municipal code: 0180
- Website: start.stockholm

Stockholm Municipality (Swedish: Stockholms kommun (Note: Finnish: Tukholman kaupunki; Lule Sami: Stockhålma stáda; Meänkieli: Stokholmin kaupunki; Northern Sami: Stuehkie gávpot; Southern Sami: Staare Stuehkie)) or the City of Stockholm (Swedish: Stockholms stad) is a municipality in Stockholm County in east central Sweden. It has the largest population of the 290 municipalities of the country, but one of the smallest areas, making it the second most densely populated. It is also the most populous municipality in the Nordic countries.

Although legally a municipality with the official proper name Stockholms kommun, the municipal assembly (kommunfullmäktige) has decided to use the name Stockholms stad (City of Stockholm in English) whenever possible. This is purely nominal and has no effect on the legal status of the municipality.

Geographically, the city comprises the Stockholm City Centre and two suburban areas, Söderort (South Stockholm) and Västerort (West Stockholm). Administratively, it is subdivided into 14 districts (sometimes incorrectly called "boroughs" in English), which are administered by district councils (stadsdelsnämnder).

== History ==
When the first local government acts came into force in Sweden in 1863, the City of Stockholm was one of the then 89 cities of Sweden. A first city council was elected. The area roughly corresponded with today's Innerstaden. Large areas were annexed in 1913, 1916 and 1949. The city was outside Stockholm County until 1968, having its own governor. The local government reform of 1971 made Stockholm a unitary municipality like all others in the country.

== Geography ==
Geographically, the City of Stockholm comprises the central part of the capital (Innerstaden or Stockholm City Centre) as well as the southern and western suburban parts (Söderort or South Stockholm and Västerort or West Stockholm respectively). Of the municipal population, all but 200 people are considered living in the Stockholm urban area, a tätort further extending into ten other municipalities.

== Demography ==
=== Population development ===
Population development in the City of Stockholm 1970–2019
Year	Population
1970	744,912
1975	665,202
1980	647,214
1985	659,030
1990	674,452
1995	711,119
2000	750,348
2005	771,038
2010	847,073
2015	923,516
2017	949,761
2019	974,073
SCB - Population by region, marital status, age and sex

=== Education ===
The share of highly educated persons, according to Statistics Sweden's definition: persons with post-secondary education that is three years or longer, is 42.4% (national average: 27.0%).

=== Residents with a foreign background ===
On 31 December 2017 the number of people with a foreign background (persons born outside of Sweden or with two parents born outside of Sweden) was 311,401, or 32.79% of the population (949,761 on 31 December 2017). On 31 December 2002 the number of residents with a foreign background was (per the same definition) 189 938, or 25.05% of the population (758,148 on 31 December 2002). On 31 December 2017 there were 949,761 residents in Stockholm, of which 234,703 people (24.71%) were born in a country other than Sweden. Divided by country in the table below – the Nordic countries as well as the 12 most common countries of birth outside of Sweden for Swedish residents have been included, with other countries of birth bundled together by continent by Statistics Sweden.

Country of birth
31 December 2019
1	Sweden	725,365
2	European Union: Other countries	35,177
3	Asia: Other countries	38,998
4	Africa: Other countries	20,832
5	Iraq	16,448
6	Finland	16,238
7	South America	15,788
8	Iran	12,390
9	Poland	11,830
10	North America	8,820
11	Somalia	8,178
12	Syria	8,180
13	Europe outside of the EU: other countries	7,016
14	Turkey	7,479
15	Eritrea	6,528
16	Germany	5,363
17	Afghanistan	4,588
18	Thailand	4,059
19	Yugoslavia/Yugoslavia; SFR Yugoslavia/Serbia and Montenegro	3,680
20	Bosnia and Herzegovina	3,360
21	Norway	3,001
22	Denmark	1,746
23	Soviet Union	1,382
24	Oceania	1,350
25	Iceland	580
26	Unknown country of birth	163

== Politics ==
=== National ===
These are the election results from the 1973 onwards in the City of Stockholm. The municipality forms one of three municipal constituencies for the Riksdag along with Gothenburg and Malmö. In the Statistics Sweden reports from 1988 to 1998 the exact decimals of the Sweden Democrats were not reported since only parties near the 4% nationwide threshold were reported on.

==== Riksdag ====
Year	Turnout	Votes	V	S	MP	C	L	KD	M	SD	ND	F!
1973	89.1	469,386	9.2	39.4	0.0	14.8	11.2	1.3	23.3	0.0	0.0	0.0
1976	90.3	471,470	8.8	38.1	0.0	13.3	13.3	0.8	24.8	0.0	0.0	0.0
1979	89.0	453,287	10.5	37.8	0.0	9.0	11.7	0.8	29.2	0.0	0.0	0.0
1982	90.0	453,535	10.1	39.4	2.2	7.3	5.9	1.0	33.7	0.0	0.0	0.0
1985	88.8	453,117	9.6	38.0	1.7	3.7	15.8	0.0	30.2	0.0	0.0	0.0
1988	84.7	432,490	10.3	33.6	5.0	4.2	14.5	1.8	27.6	0.0	0.0	0.0
1991	85.7	433,200	7.1	29.8	5.3	2.9	11.4	4.9	30.7	0.0	6.8	0.0
1994	85.4	438,432	8.4	34.8	5.8	3.2	10.2	3.0	32.2	0.0	1.3	0.0
1998	81.0	436,295	12.9	27.2	5.8	1.7	7.5	8.9	33.7	0.0	0.0	0.0
2002	80.7	458,005	10.8	31.3	6.7	1.7	19.5	6.5	21.0	1.0	0.0	0.0
2006	82.4	482,455	7.4	23.2	9.3	5.7	10.1	5.0	35.1	1.6	0.0	1.4
2010	85.0	534,887	7.4	20.9	12.2	6.3	8.6	5.3	34.3	3.2	0.0	0.9
2014	85.8	581,065	7.7	21.6	11.2	4.9	7.9	4.3	27.7	6.6	0.0	7.2
2018	87.3	611,206	13.1	23.8	7.7	9.1	7.9	4.9	21.9	9.8	0.0	0.7

Blocs

This lists the relative strength of the socialist and centre-right blocs since 1973, but parties not elected to the Riksdag are inserted as "other", including the Sweden Democrats results from 1988 to 2006, but also the Christian Democrats pre-1991 and the Greens in 1982, 1985 and 1991. The sources are identical to the table above. The coalition or government mandate marked in bold formed the government after the election. New Democracy got elected in 1991 but are still listed as "other" due to the short lifespan of the party. "Elected" is the total number of percentage points from the municipality that went to parties who were elected to the Riksdag.

Year	Turnout	Votes	Left	Right	SD	Other	Elected
1973	89.1	469,386	**48.6**	49.3	0.0	2.1	97.9
1976	90.3	471,470	46.9	**51.4**	0.0	1.7	98.3
1979	89.0	453,287	48.3	**49.9**	0.0	1.8	98.2
1982	90.0	453,535	**49.5**	46.9	0.0	3.6	96.4
1985	88.8	453,117	**47.6**	49.7	0.0	2.7	97.3
1988	84.7	432,490	**48.9**	46.3	0.0	4.8	95.2
1991	85.7	433,200	36.9	**49.9**	0.0	13.2	93.6
1994	85.4	438,432	**49.0**	48.6	0.0	2.4	97.6
1998	81.0	436,295	**45.9**	51.8	0.0	2.3	97.7
2002	80.7	458,005	**48.8**	48.7	0.0	3.5	96.5
2006	82.4	482,455	39.9	**55.9**	0.0	4.2	95.8
2010	85.0	534,887	40.5	**54.5**	3.2	1.8	98.2
2014	85.8	581,065	**40.5**	44.8	6.6	8.1	91.9
2018	87.3	611,206	**44.6**	43.7	9.8	1.9	98.1

=== Local ===
The municipality is governed by a Municipal assembly (kommunfullmäktige) with 101 members. These are elected through municipal elections, held in conjunction with the Parliamentary elections every four years. The council meets twice a month and the meetings are open to the public. The council elects a Municipal executive committee (kommunstyrelse), with 13 members representing both the political majority and the opposition, with the responsibility of implementing policies approved by the assembly. The political organisation also includes eight governing full-time Commissioners (borgarråd) and four Commissioners representing the opposition. The work is headed by the Commissioner of Finance (finansborgarråd, sometimes called Mayor), who also chairs the executive committee. The current Commissioner of Finance is Karin Wanngård, representing the Social democrats.

Following the 2014 municipal elections, the seats are divided in the following way:
The governing parties		Parties in opposition	
The Social Democrats	24	The Moderate Party	28
The Left Party	10	The Liberal People's Party	9
The Green Party	16	The Christian Democrats	2
The Feminist Initiative	3	The Centre Party	3
		The Sweden Democrats	6

Following the 2010 municipal elections, the seats are divided in the following way:
The governing parties		Parties in opposition	
The Moderate Party	38	The Social Democrats	25
The Liberal People's Party	10	The Left Party	8
The Christian Democrats	1	The Green Party	16
The Centre Party	3		

Following the 2006 municipal elections, the seats are divided in the following way:
The governing parties		Parties in opposition	
The Moderate Party	39	The Social Democrats	27
The Liberal People's Party	10	The Left Party	9
The Christian Democrats	3	The Green Party	10
		The Centre Party	1

Following the 2002 municipal elections, the seats were divided in the following way:
Governing parties		Parties in opposition	
Social Democrats	35	Moderate Party	27
Left Party	11	Liberal People's Party	17
Green Party	6	Christian Democrats	5

=== Municipal elections 1994–2014 ===
Year	Sweden Democrats			Moderate Party			Christian Democrats			Centre Party			Liberals			Stockholm Party			Green Party			Feminist Initiative			Social Democrats			Left Party			others		
Year	Votes	%	Seats	Votes	%	Seats	Votes	%	Seats	Votes	%	Seats	Votes	%	Seats	Votes	%	Seats	Votes	%	Seats	Votes	%	Seats	Votes	%	Seats	Votes	%	Seats	Votes	%	Seats
1994				128,975	28,7	29	9,399	2,1	0	24,329	5,4	5	35,437	7,9	9	15,309	3,4	2	35,120	7,8	8				148,684	33,0	37	41,274	9,2	11	11,533	2,5	0
1998				146,797	32,9	35	28,320	6,4	6	9,187	2,1	0	34,789	7,8	9	19,561	4,4	3	26,347	5,9	6				114,118	25,6	28	54,663	12,3	13	20,411	4,5	0
2002				121,405	26,0	27	20,746	4,4	5	5,939	1,2	0	73,736	15,7	17	9,137	1,9	0	24,965	5,3	6				149,871	32,0	35	52,325	11,2	11	8,772	1,8	0
2006				180,207	37,3	41	18,907	3,9	3	15,205	3,1	1	46,657	9,6	10	5,831	1,2	0	44,530	9,2	10				118,129	24,4	27	38,284	7,9	9	16,084	2,6	0
2010				184,344	34,4	38	18,705	3,5	1	21,335	4,0	3	53,770	10,0	10				74,437	13,9	16				121,273	22,6	25	39,920	7,4	8	22,710	4,2	0
2014	30,078	5,2	6	158,450	28,1	28	19,125	3,3	2	27,369	4,7	3	48,302	8,3	9				83,561	14,3	16	27,079	4,6	3	128,086	22,0	24	52,146	8,9	10	9,137	1,6	0

Stockholm Party is a local party, which was represented in the City Council 1979–2002.

=== Municipal Election 2018 ===
On 9 September 2018 Stockholm held Municipality Elections

Party	Votes			Seats	
Party	Number	%	+/−	Number	+/−
Social Democrats	137,874	22,30	+0,34	23	−1
Moderate Party	129,725	20,98	−6,18	22	−6
Left Party	80,592	13,03	+4,10	13	+3
Liberal People's Party	62,271	10,07	+1,79	10	+1
Green Party	51,531	8,33	−5,99	9	−7
Sweden Democrats	49,238	7,96	+2,81	8	+2
Centre Party	48,786	7,89	+3,20	8	+5
Christian Democrats	31,198	5,05	+1,77	5	+3
Feminist Initiative	20,387	3,30	−1,34	3	+/-0
Others	6,676	1,08	−0,49	0	+/−0
Total	583,333	100,00	+/−0	101	+/−0

=== Board of Commissioners since 2006 ===
- Sten Nordin (m), Commissioner of Finance (after 2008) (finansborgarråd)
- Mikael Söderlund (m), Commissioner of Building and Traffic (byggnads- och trafikborgarråd)
- Ulla Hamilton (m), Commissioner of Environment and Real Estate (miljö och bostadsbolagsborgarråd)
- Lotta Edholm (fp), Commissioner of Education (skolborgarråd)
- Madeleine Sjöstedt (fp), Commissioner of Culture and Sports (kulturborgarråd)
- Kristina Alvendal (m), Commissioner of Housing and Integration (bostads- och integrationsborgarråd)
- Ulf Kristersson (m), Commissioner of Social Services (socialborgarråd)
- Ewa Samuelsson (kd), Commissioner of Senior Citizen's Service (äldrevårdsborgarråd)
- Carin Jämtin (s), Commissioner in Opposition (oppositionsborgarråd)
- Roger Mogert (s), Commissioner in Opposition (oppositionsborgarråd)
- Ann-Margarethe Livh (v), Commissioner in Opposition (oppositionsborgarråd)
- Yvonne Ruwaida (mp), Commissioner in Opposition (oppositionsborgarråd)

=== District councils ===
The district council areas of Stockholm

The municipality is subdivided into 13 districts. These districts are sometimes incorrectly referred to as "boroughs" in English. They are, however, no legal entities or juristic persons of their own, but committees of the municipality itself. These districts are administered by District Councils, stadsdelsnämnder, which carry responsibility for primary school, social, leisure and cultural services within their respective areas. The members of these councils are not directly elected by the inhabitants of the respective districts, but rather appointed by the kommunfullmäktige (municipal assembly).

Effective 1 January 2007 the number of district councils was reduced from 18 to 14 through a number of merges. Maria-Gamla stan and Katarina-Sofia now form Södermalm borough, Enskede-Årsta and Vantör now form Enskede-Årsta-Vantör, Hägersten and Liljeholmen now form Hägersten-Liljeholmen, and Kista and Rinkeby now form Rinkeby-Kista.

Stockholm City Centre
- Kungsholmen
- Norrmalm
- Södermalm
- Östermalm
South Stockholm
- Älvsjö
- Enskede-Årsta-Vantör
- Farsta
- Hägersten-Liljeholmen
- Skarpnäck
- Skärholmen
West Stockholm
- Bromma
- Hässelby-Vällingby
- Rinkeby-Kista
- Spånga-Tensta

== Twin towns and sister cities ==
The policy of Stockholm is to have informal town twinning with all capitals of the world, its main focus being those in northern Europe. Stockholm does not sign any formal town twinning treaties, although other cities claim to have established such treaties in the past which are still valid.

The cities claiming to have been twinned with Stockholm are:

- Tirana, Albania
- Warsaw, Poland
- Kyiv, Ukraine
- Tunis, Tunisia
- Cali, Colombia
- Sarajevo, Bosnia and Herzegovina (since 1997)
- St. Petersburg, Russia (since 1992)
- Istanbul, Turkey
- Podgorica, Montenegro
- Reykjavík, Iceland
- Riga, Latvia
- Khemisset, Morocco
