= Postal codes in Sweden =

For the purposes of directing mail, Sweden is divided into a number of postcode areas. The Swedish postcode (Swedish: postnummer) system is administered by PostNord Sverige (formerly Posten AB) on behalf of the Swedish Post and Telecom Authority (Swedish: Post- och telestyrelsen).

== History ==
Until 1968, mail in Sweden was sorted only according to geographic location, which meant that postal workers had to learn all mail centers in Sweden, and what particular mail trains served those places. In 1967, it was decided that postcodes would be introduced in Sweden as of May 12, 1968. Since then, the postcode system has been essentially the same, but a slight reform was carried out during the mid-1990s as all remaining mail terminals were equipped with automatic mail sorting machines. In 2008, Sweden was divided into more than 16,100 postcode areas.

== Format ==
The Swedish postcode system is based on a five-digit number combination, divided into two groups of three and two digits. The principle of numbering is that the lower the postcode, the further south the place is located. Excluded from the principle are postcodes beginning with number 1, which represent the capital city, Stockholm. Mail delivery centers are divided into two-, three-, and five-digit positioning groups depending on the size of the geographical place. The two-position group has larger varieties, whereas the smallest belongs to the five-digit positioning group.

According to the system, a space shall be inserted between the third and fourth digit. Earlier recommendations said that a double space should be placed between the postcode and the geographic location and that the geographic location should be written in capital letters. A single space is now the norm and capital letters are not required anymore.

A typical address would look like this:

Sven Nilsson (First, and last name)
Roslagsgatan 10 (Street, and number)
113 51 Stockholm (Postcode, and geographic location)

=== Two-digit positioning ===
The two initial digits indicate city. Stockholm, Gothenburg, and Malmö are designated the two-digit series, one for mailbox- and business addresses, and the second series for street addresses.

The post codes are sorted by geographical location. Numbers starting with 10-19 are part of Stockholm; otherwise, the lower numbers are part of the bigger city areas in the south, and increase northwards.

First digit	Region	Cities with their own second digit
1	Stockholm County with the exception of Norrtälje Municipality	Stockholm (10–11 and some smaller isolated ranges)
2	Skåne County and parts of Kronoberg County and Blekinge County	Malmö (20–21), Lund (22), Helsingborg (25)
3	Parts of Jönköping County, Kronoberg County, Kalmar County, Blekinge County and Halland County	Halmstad (30), Växjö (35), Kalmar (39)
4	Parts of Västra Götaland County and Halland County	Gothenburg (40–41)
5	Parts of Östergötland County, Jönköping County, Kalmar County and Västra Götaland County	Borås (50), Jönköping (55), Linköping (58)
6	Södermanland County, Gotland County, Värmland County and parts of Östergötland County, Västra Götaland County and Örebro County	Norrköping (60), Eskilstuna (63), Karlstad (65)
7	Southern and middle Uppsala County, Västmanland County, Dalarna County and parts of Stockholm County and Örebro County	Örebro (70), Västerås (72), Uppsala (75)
8	Northern Uppsala County, Gävleborg County, Västernorrland County and Jämtland County	Gävle (80), Sundsvall (85)
9	Västerbotten County and Norrbotten County	Umeå (90), Luleå (97)

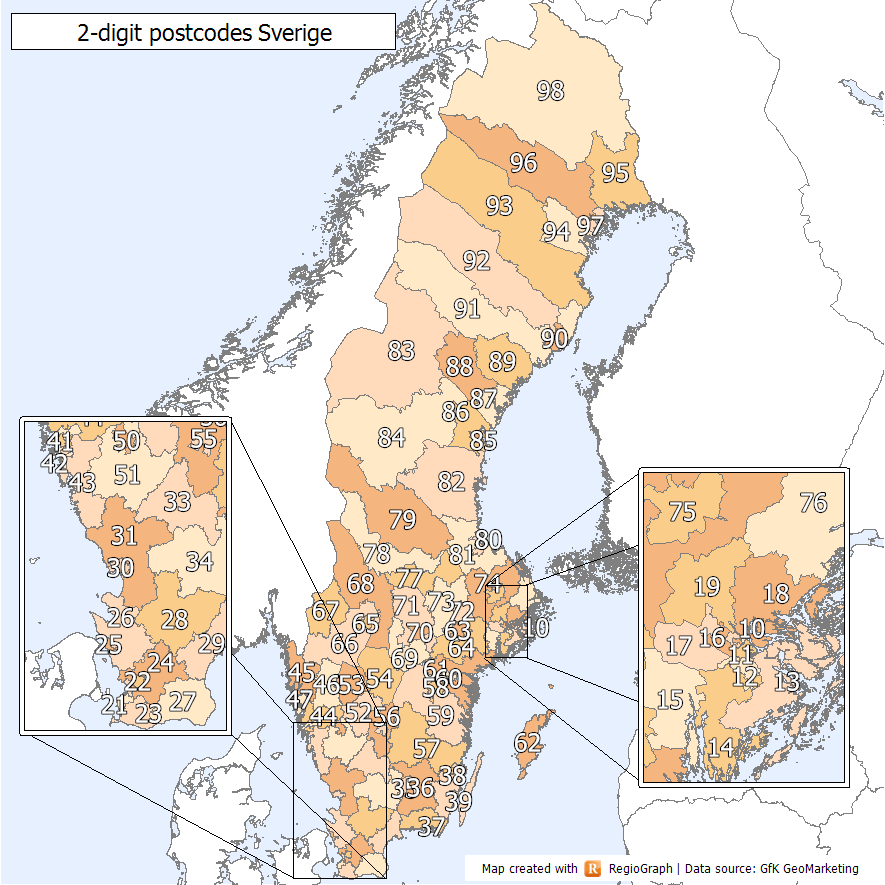
2-digit postcode areas Sweden(defined through the first two postcode digits)

Postcode	Geographic location	Notes
10x xx	Stockholm	Mailbox and business addresses
11x xx	Stockholm	Street addresses
20x xx	Malmö	Mailbox- and business addresses
21x xx	Malmö	Street addresses
22x xx	Lund	
25x xx	Helsingborg	
30x xx	Halmstad	
35x xx	Växjö	
39x xx	Kalmar	
40x xx	Gothenburg	Mailbox- and business addresses
41x xx	Gothenburg	Street addresses
50x xx	Borås	
55x xx	Jönköping	
58x xx	Linköping	
60x xx	Norrköping	
63x xx	Eskilstuna	
65x xx	Karlstad	
70x xx	Örebro	
72x xx	Västerås	
75x xx	Uppsala	
80x xx	Gävle	
85x xx	Sundsvall	
90x xx	Umeå	
97x xx	Luleå	Changed from 951 xx

The third digit in the two-digit positioning indicate type of delivery, in most cases.

Postcode	Type of delivery	Note
xx0 xx	Mail boxes and mail addresses	
xx1 xx	Mail boxes and business addresses	
xx2 xx	Regular mail delivery	
xx3 xx	Regular mail delivery	
xx4 xx	Regular mail delivery	
xx5 xx	Countryside mail delivery	
xx6 xx	Regular mail delivery	
xx7 xx	Regular mail delivery	
xx8 xx	Regular reply mail	
xx9 xx	Temporary	Temporary postcodes

The fourth and fifth digit indicate the geographic area. Postcodes with the same first four digits may represent a part of a city or equivalent.

=== Three-digit positioning ===
The first two digits indicate the geographical area in. Previously, these figures indicated the mail terminal that sorted mail for the particular geographic location.

Postal code	Approximate geographical area
10x xx - 11x xx	Norrmalm, Östermalm, Västermalm, Södermalm
12x xx	Skarpnäck, Farsta, Enskede-Årsta-Vantör, Älvsjö, Hägersten-Liljeholmen, Skärholmen
13x xx	Nacka, Värmdö, Tyresö, Haninge
14x xx	Huddinge, Botkyrka, Salem, Nynäshamn
15x xx	Södertälje, Nykvarn
16x xx	Bromma, Hässelby-Vällingby, Spånga, Kista
17x xx	Ekerö, Järfälla, Sundbyberg, Solna
18x xx	Lidingö, Danderyd, Täby, Vallentuna, Österåker, Waxholm
19x xx	Sollentuna, Upplands-Väsby, Sigtuna, Upplands-Bro
23x xx	South-western Skåne County
24x xx	Central Skåne County
26x xx	North-western Skåne County
27x xx	South-eastern Skåne County
28x xx	Northern Skåne County and south-western Kronoberg County
29x xx	North-eastern Skåne County and western Blekinge County
31x xx	Southern Halland County
33x xx	Western Jönköping County
34x xx	Western Kronoberg County
36x xx	Eastern Kronoberg County
37x xx	Middle and eastern Blekinge County
38x xx	Southern Kalmar County
42x xx - 47x xx	Northern Halland County and western Västra Götaland County
51x xx	Southern Västra Götaland County
52x xx - 54x xx	Eastern Västra Götaland County
56x xx - 57x xx	Northern Jönköping County and middle Kalmar County
59x xx	Southern Östergötland County and northern Kalmar County
61x xx	Northern Östergötland County and southern Södermanland County
62x xx	Gotland County
64x xx	Northern Södermanland County
66x xx - 68x xx	Värmland County and northern Västra Götaland County
69x xx	Southern Örebro County
71x xx	Northern Örebro County
73x xx	Västmanland County
74x xx	Middle and southern Uppsala County
76x xx	Norrtälje Municipality
77x xx	Southern Dalarna County
78x xx	Central and western Dalarna County
79x xx	Northern Dalarna County
81x xx	Southern Gävleborg County and northern Uppsala County
82x xx	Northern Gävleborg County
83x xx	Northern Jämtland County
84x xx	Southern Jämtland County and south-western Västernorrland County
86x xx	South-eastern Västernorrland County
87x xx	Middle Västernorrland County
88x xx	North-western Västernorrland County
89x xx	North-eastern Västernorrland County
91x xx	Southern Västerbotten County
92x xx	Middle Västerbotten County
93x xx	North-eastern Västerbotten County and South-western Norrbotten County
94x xx	Southern Norrbotten County
95x xx	Middle Norrbotten County
96x xx	South-eastern Norrbotten County
98x xx	Northern Norrbotten County

The third figure in combination with the first two indicates the mail delivery location. The fourth figure is the type of delivery.

Postcode	Type of delivery
xxx 0x	Mailboxes- and postal addresses
xxx 1x	Mailboxes, business addresses
xxx 2x	Regular mail delivery, mailboxes, and reply mail
xxx 3x	Regular mail delivery
xxx 4x	Regular mail delivery
xxx 5x	Regular mail delivery
xxx 6x	Regular mail delivery
xxx 7x	Regular mail delivery
xxx 8x	Reply mail, and business addresses
xxx 9x	Countryside mail delivery

=== Five-digit positioning ===
Five-digit positioning is used for locations small enough that only one or a few postal codes are required for routing. Since the reform of the postcode system in the mid-1990s, only a few five-digit positions locations remain. These locations are often so small and remote that it is not practically possible to transfer all mail to a larger three-digit locations. Five-digit position locations are usually in the archipelago and in the mountains.

== Postcode directories with external links ==
- The last printed postcode directory was published by the Swedish Mail Service in 1996.
- Postcodes may be searched on the Mail Service's website here (invalid).
- Statistics Sweden has a detailed table of postcode, region, municipality and city here (invalid).
- Postcode look-up and calculation of distances / radius between postcodes in Sweden.
