= Södermalm (borough) =

- Borough of Stockholm
- Location of Södermalm shown in white

- Location of Södermalm within Sweden
- Coordinates: 59.31°N 18.06°E
- Country: Sweden
- Municipality: Stockholm Municipality
- Municipality subdivision: Söderort
- Established: 2007

Government
  - Type: Municipal assembly
  - Municipal commissioner: Christoffer Järkeborn (M)

Population (2014)
  - Total: 126,736
- Time zone: UTC+1 (CET)
  - Summer (DST): UTC+2 (CEST)
- Postal code: 111--, 116--, 117--, 118--, 120--
- Website: Stockholm.se

Södermalm is a city district area (Swedish: stadsdelsområde, often referred to as a borough) in central Stockholm, Sweden. Södermalm borough has a population of around 110,000, making it the most populated borough of Stockholm. The urban development project of Hammarby Sjöstad is located in the Södermalm borough.

== Overview ==
Södermalm was created 1 January 2007, through the merging of the boroughs of Maria-Gamla Stan and Katarina-Sofia. It covers the island of Södermalm and some neighboring districts. The two former boroughs made up the eastern and western half of the island of Södermalm. Maria-Gamla Stan was the result of a previous merging between the original borough with the same name, and the former borough of Hornstull, in 1999. Maria-Gamla Stan also included the island districts of Gamla Stan, Långholmen, Reimersholme, Riddarholmen and Årsta holmar; Katarina-Sofia included the district Södra Hammarbyhamnen south of Södermalm. All these districts are now parts of the new Södermalm borough.

== Gallery ==
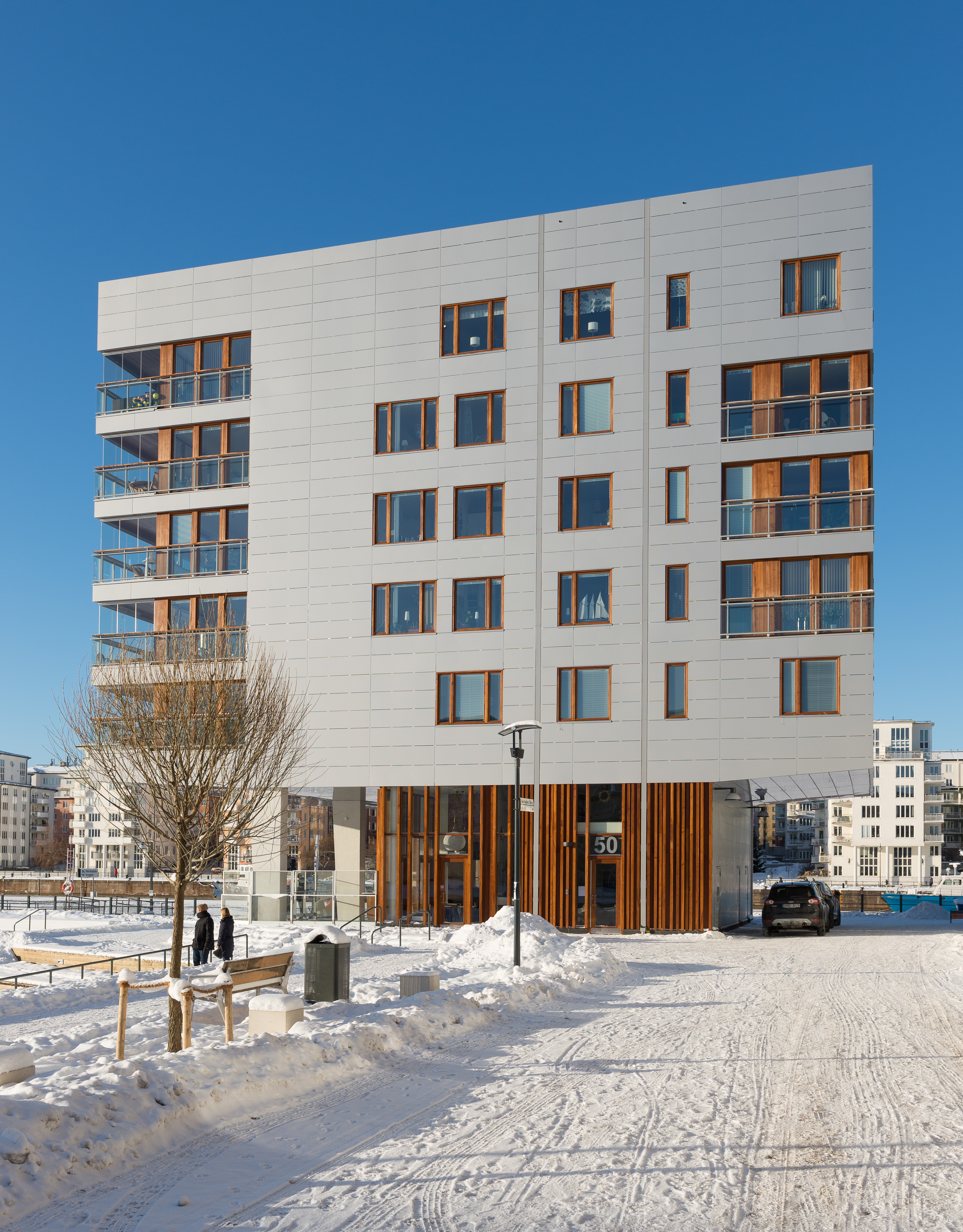
Modern building in Hammarby Sjöstad

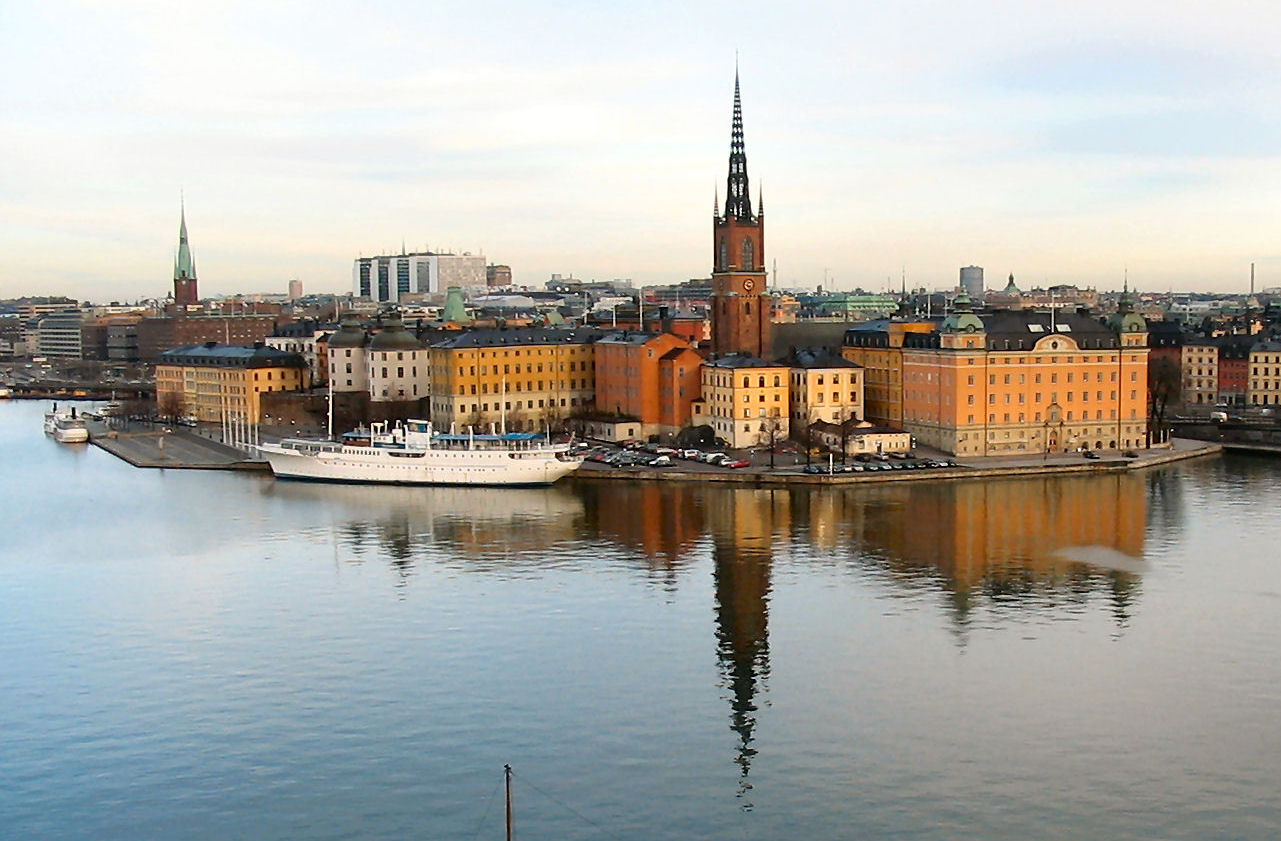
Riddarholmen

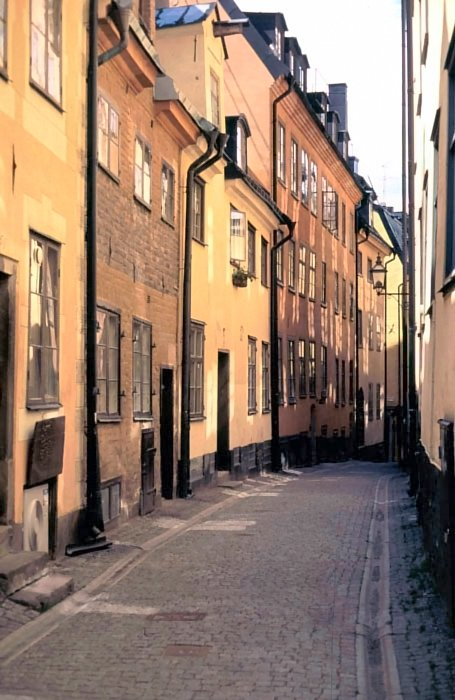
Street in Gamla stan

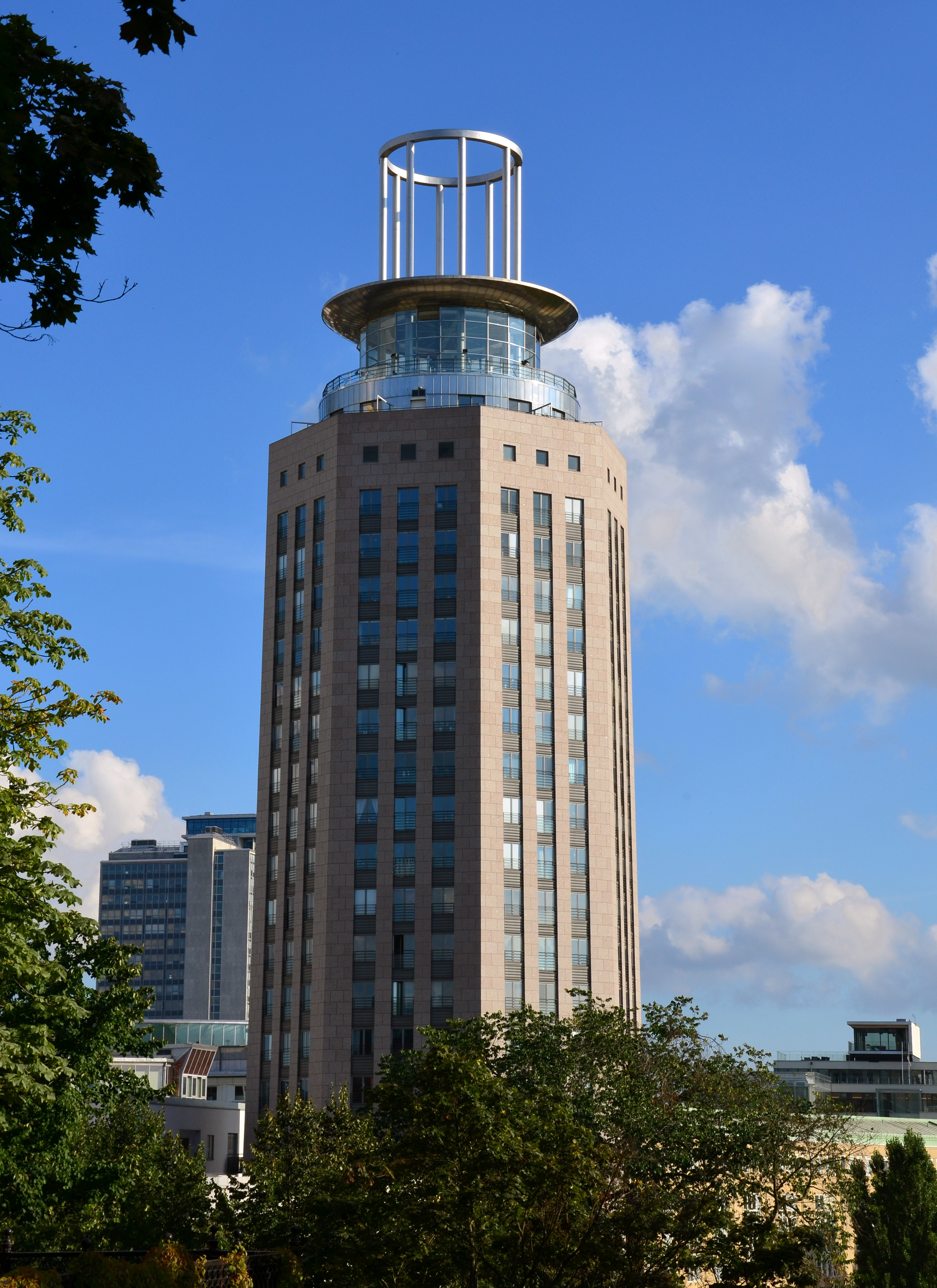
The South Tower, adjacent to Medborgarplatsen in the center of Södermalm
