= Spånga =

Community in Spånga-Tensta, Stockholm, Sweden

Coordinates: 59°22′49″N 17°53′36″E

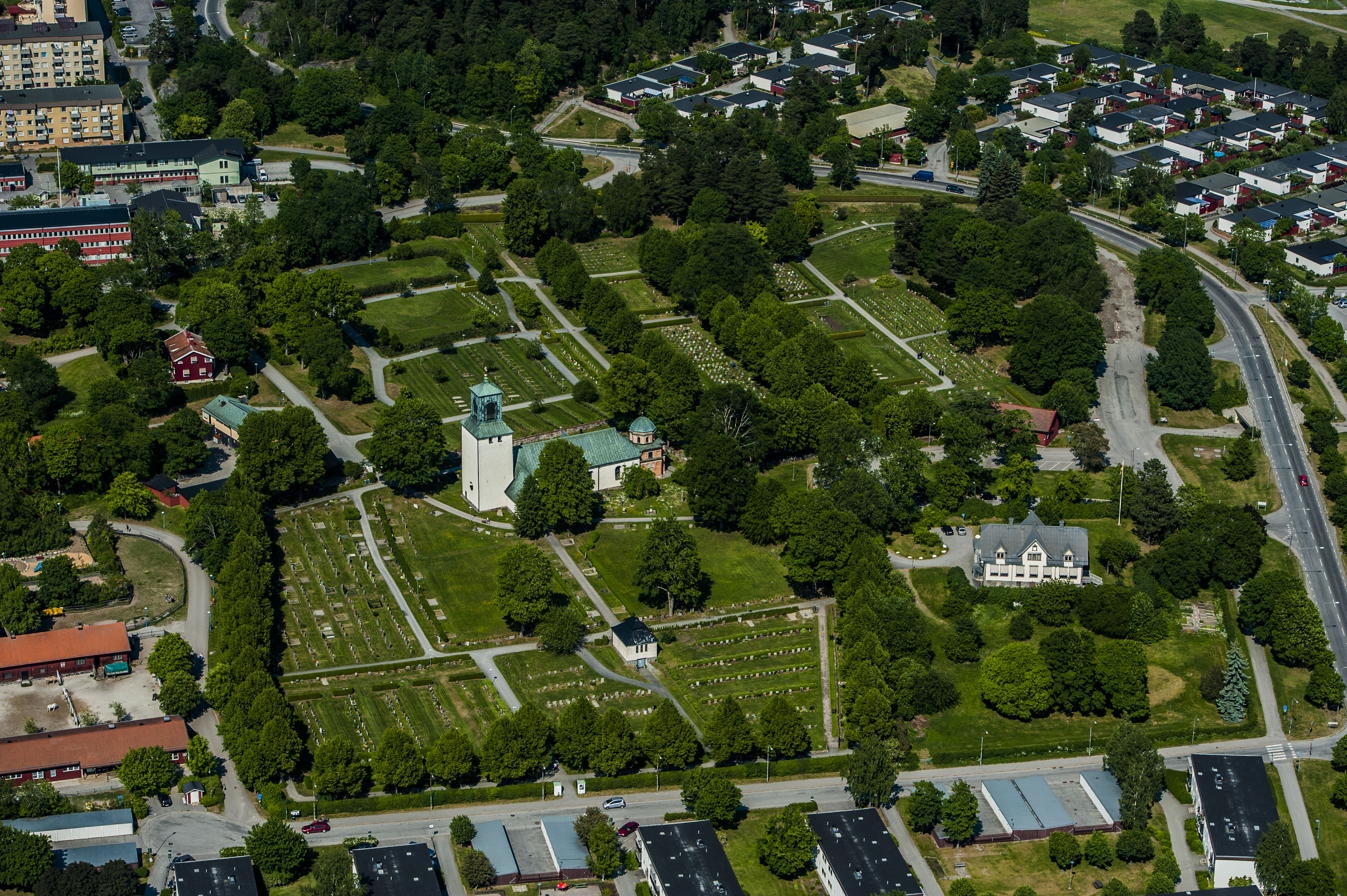
Aerial view of Spånga Church

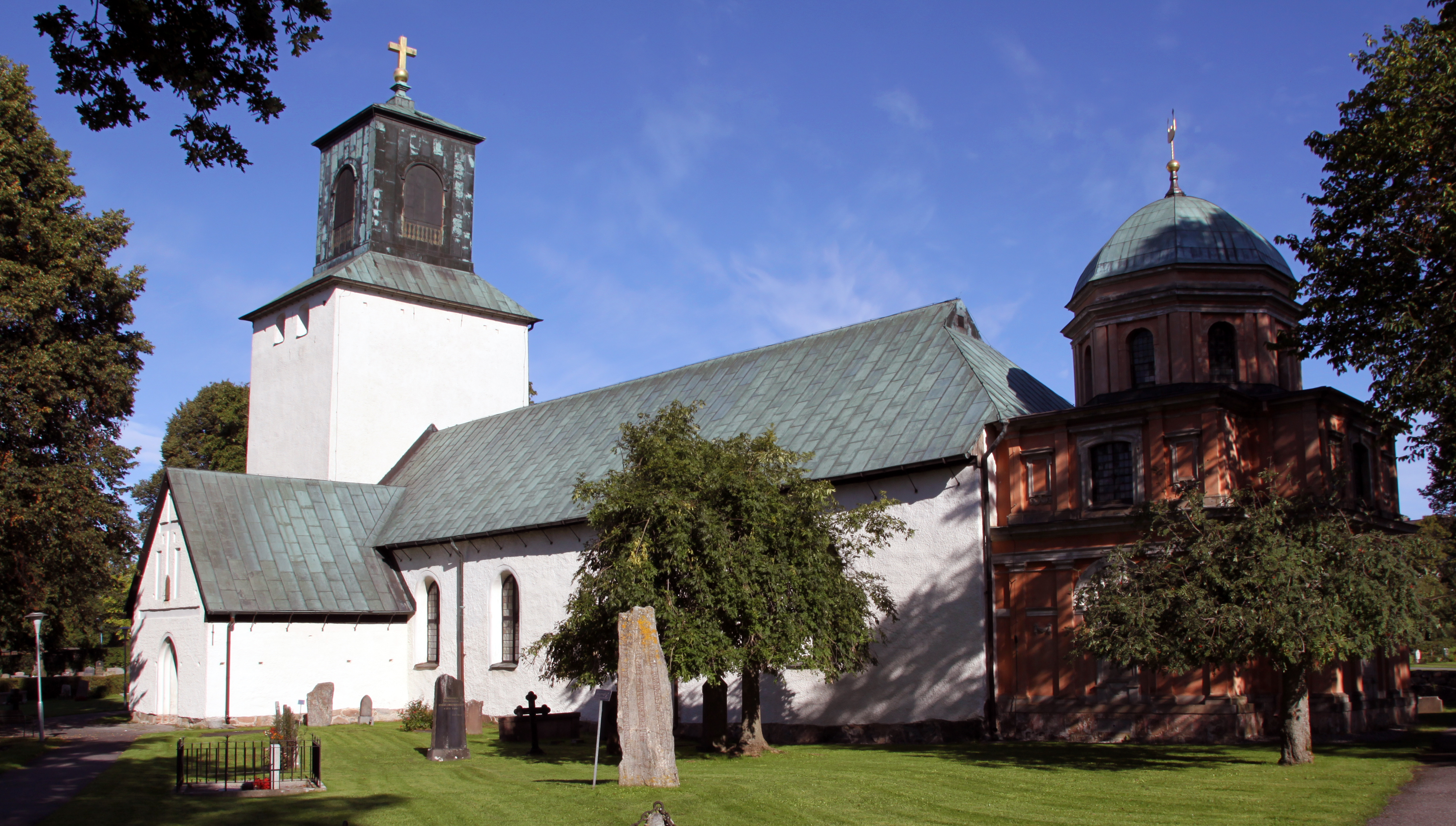
Spånga Church

Spånga is a community and parish in the borough of Spånga-Tensta in Stockholm County, Sweden.

== Background ==
Spånga was an independent municipality until January 1, 1949, when most of it was merged with the City of Stockholm, with smaller portions of the area merging with Solna, Sundbyberg, and Sollentuna municipalities.

Spånga was originally the name of a village centered on Spånga Church (Spånga kyrka), which dates to the 12th century.

Spånga is home to the largest TV studio in Sweden run by NEP Group which has 3 studio in total there, shows including Idol 2020 have been filmed there. Due to COVID-19 Melodifestivalen considered using the studios for 2021 to film all 6 editions instead of the nationwide tour.

== School ==
Spånga high school was built in 1928 and it is near Spånga station and Spånga market. As of 2020 the school had about 600 pupils.

Spånga elementary school has about 470 pupils today and there are grades 7 through 9. Spånga elementary school share premises with Spånga high school. This school also has a special course with boosted math and science subjects.

== Politics ==
Spånga IP hosts Järvaveckan, an annual event that invites speakers from Swedish political parties and other entities. It is similar to Gotland's Almedalen Week with more focus on Stockholm.

== Sports ==
The following sports clubs are located in Spånga:

- Spånga IS FK
- Turkiska SK

== Notable people ==
- Dolph Lundgren (born 1957)
- Björn Söderberg (born 1958)
- Mårten Klingberg (born 1968)
- Ivan Mathias Petersson (born 1971)
- Benjamin Tahirović (born 2003)

== See also ==
- Spånga-Tensta
