= Norra Djurgårdsstaden =

Area of Stockholm, Sweden

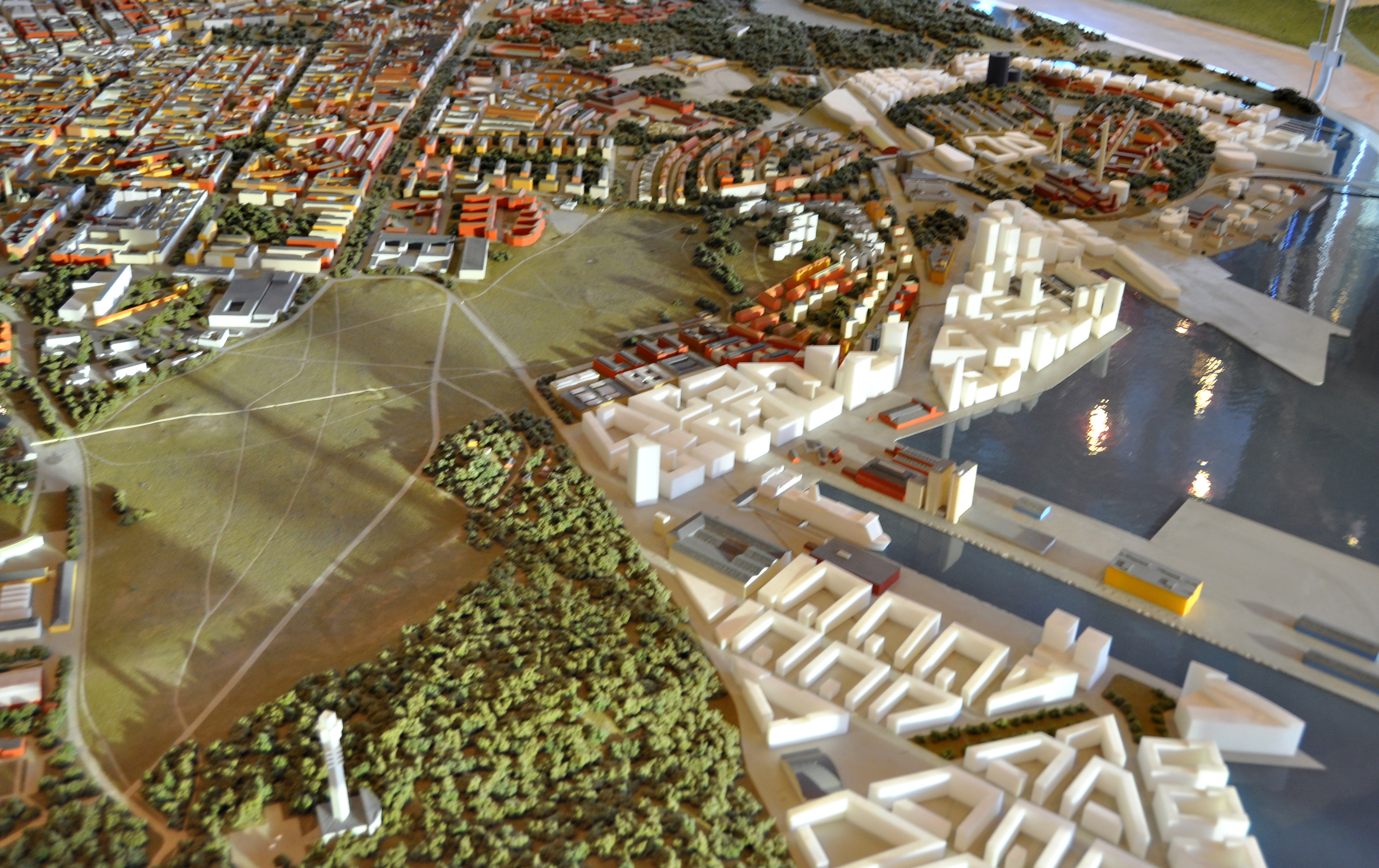
Model of planned development

Norra Djurgårdsstaden (officially Stockholm Royal Seaport in English) is a large area of central Stockholm, Sweden. The area is located in the borough of Östermalm and is undergoing brownfield redevelopment.

The area consists of former harbours and industries. An important part of the development concerns a concentration of port operations to the two piers in Värtahamnen and at Frihamnen. 10,000 dwellings and 30,000 workplaces will be developed in the area up to 2025. The project is part of the Clinton Climate Initiative.

== History ==
Norra Djurgårdsstaden was historically a part of Kungliga Djurgården. Since the 1880s, this area – together with its harbour – has been developed into one of Stockholm's largest industrial areas. The direct access to the Baltic Sea was one of the reasons for building the port of Värtahamnen in 1884. To begin with, this harbour was mainly used to transport coal, which was used as a fuel at the local gasworks. At the start of the 21st century, it was decided that this area should be modernised and the previous industries should be demolished.

== Photo gallery ==
June 2013.

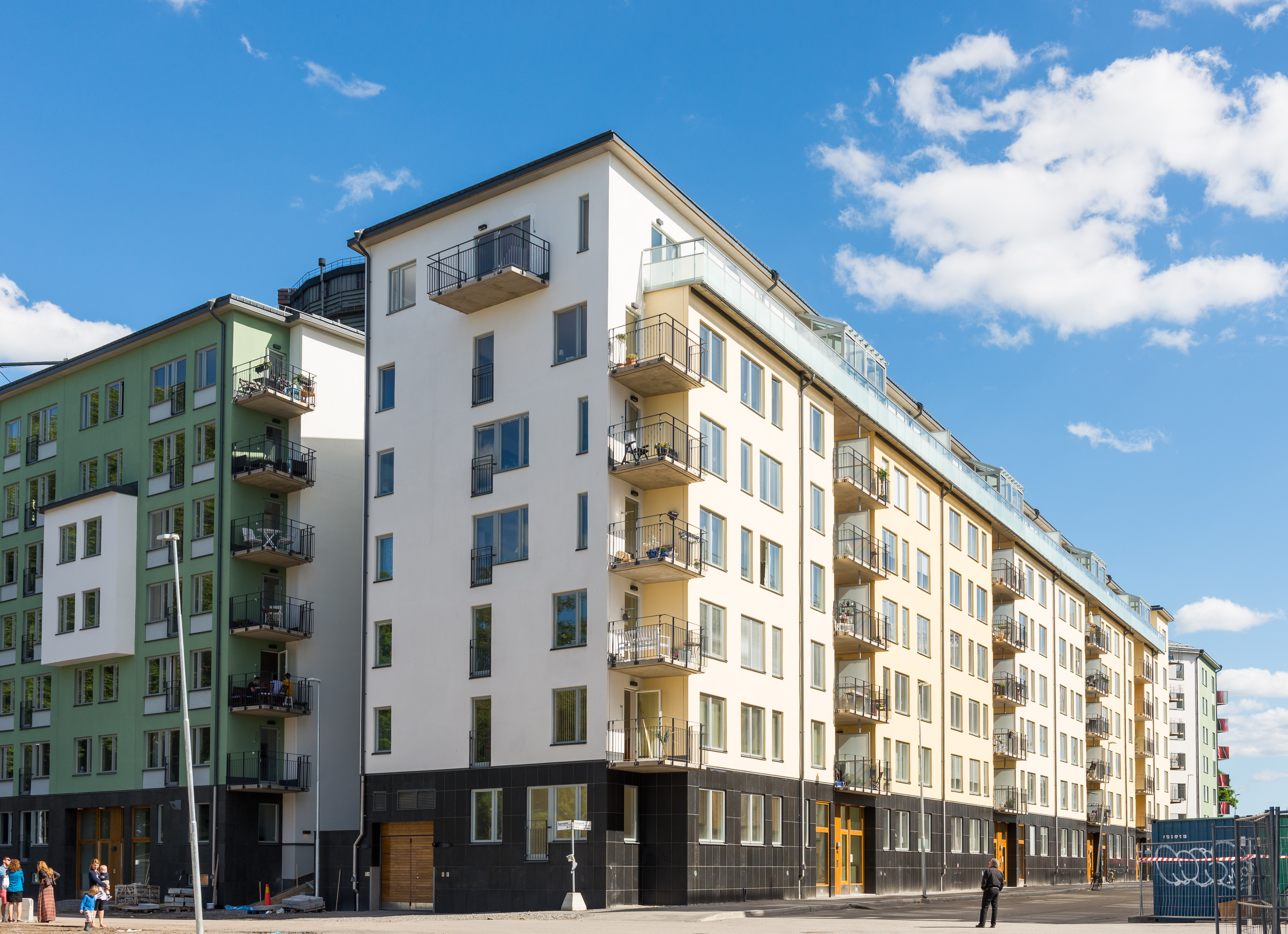

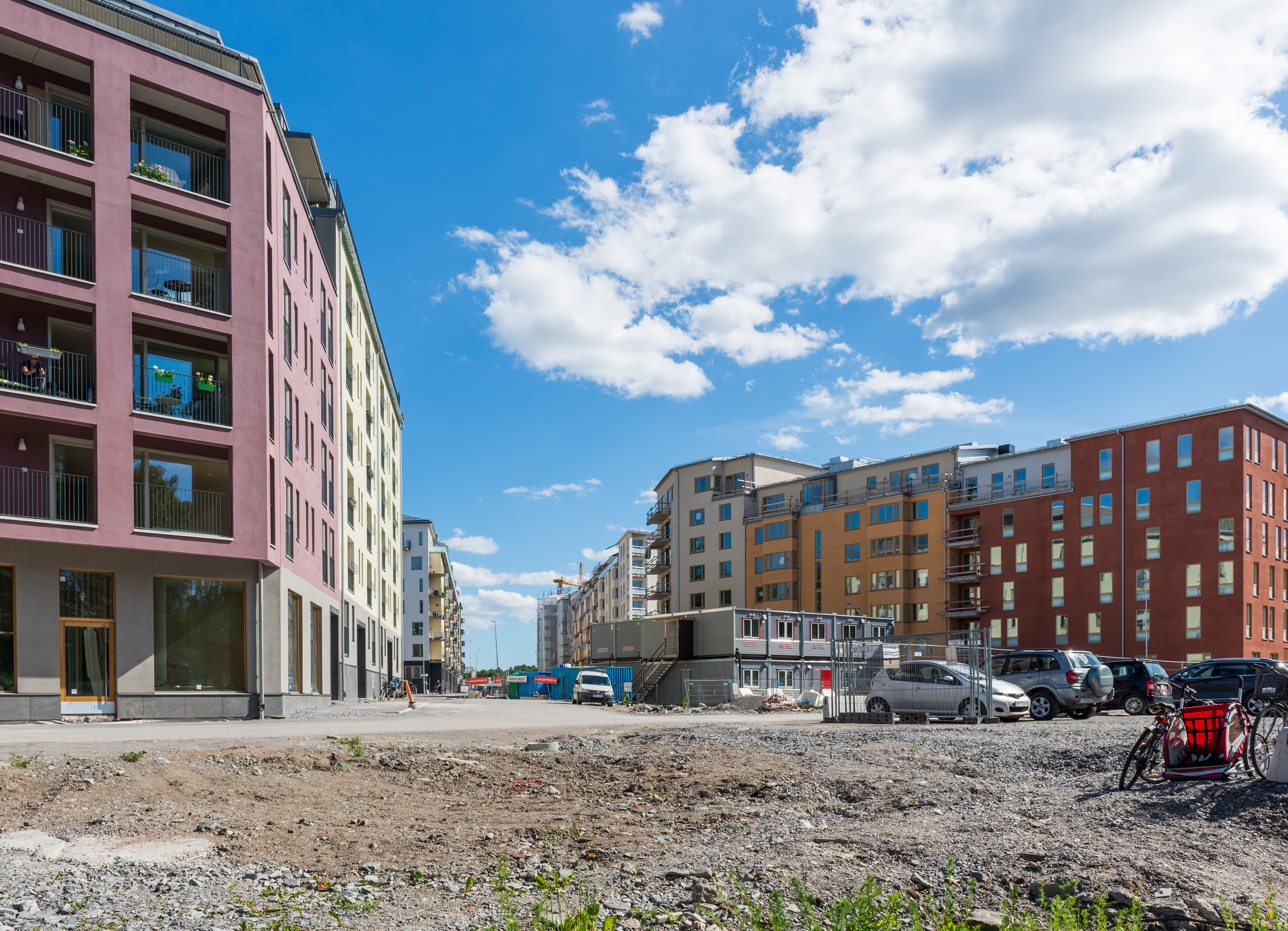

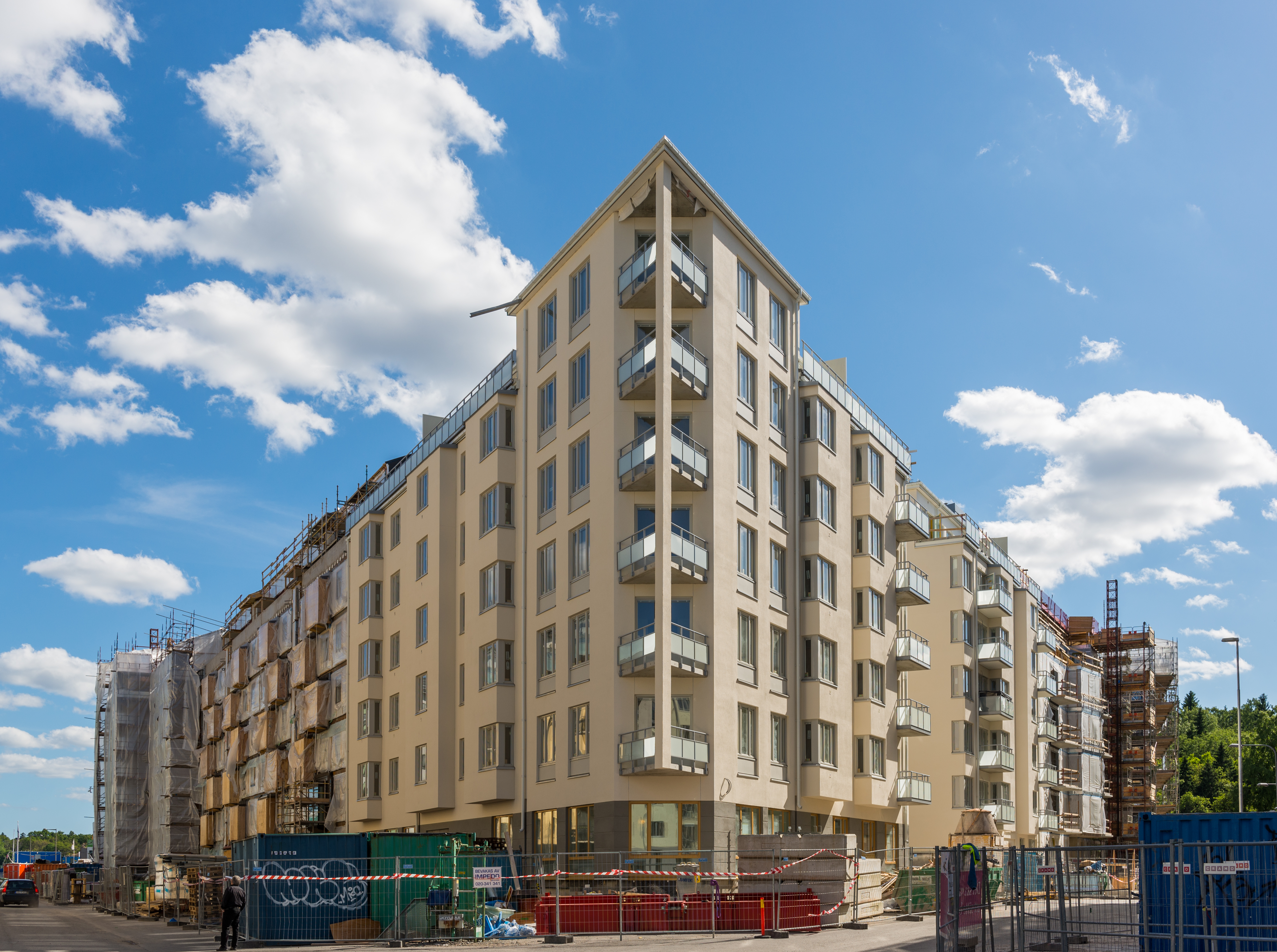

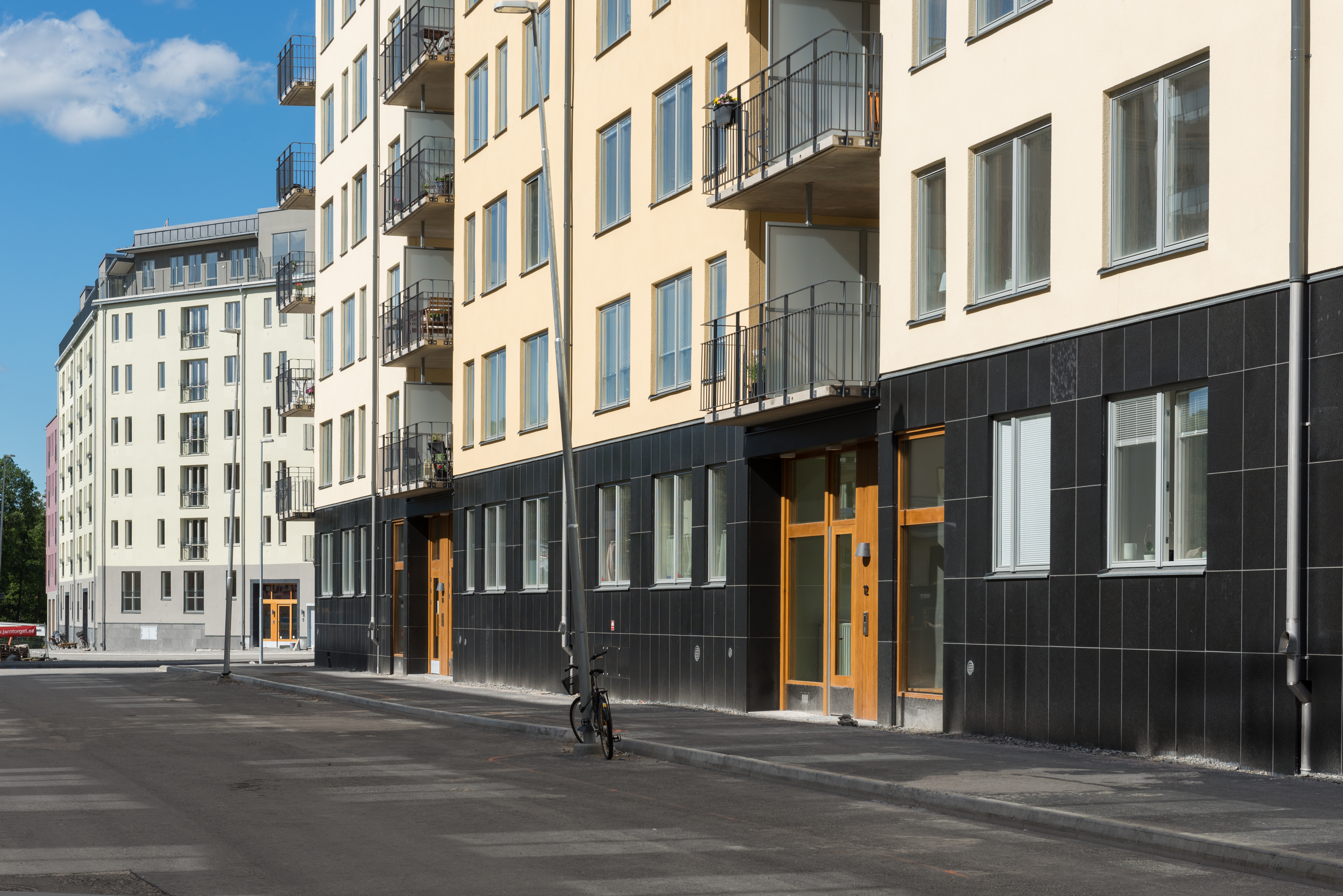

February 2015.

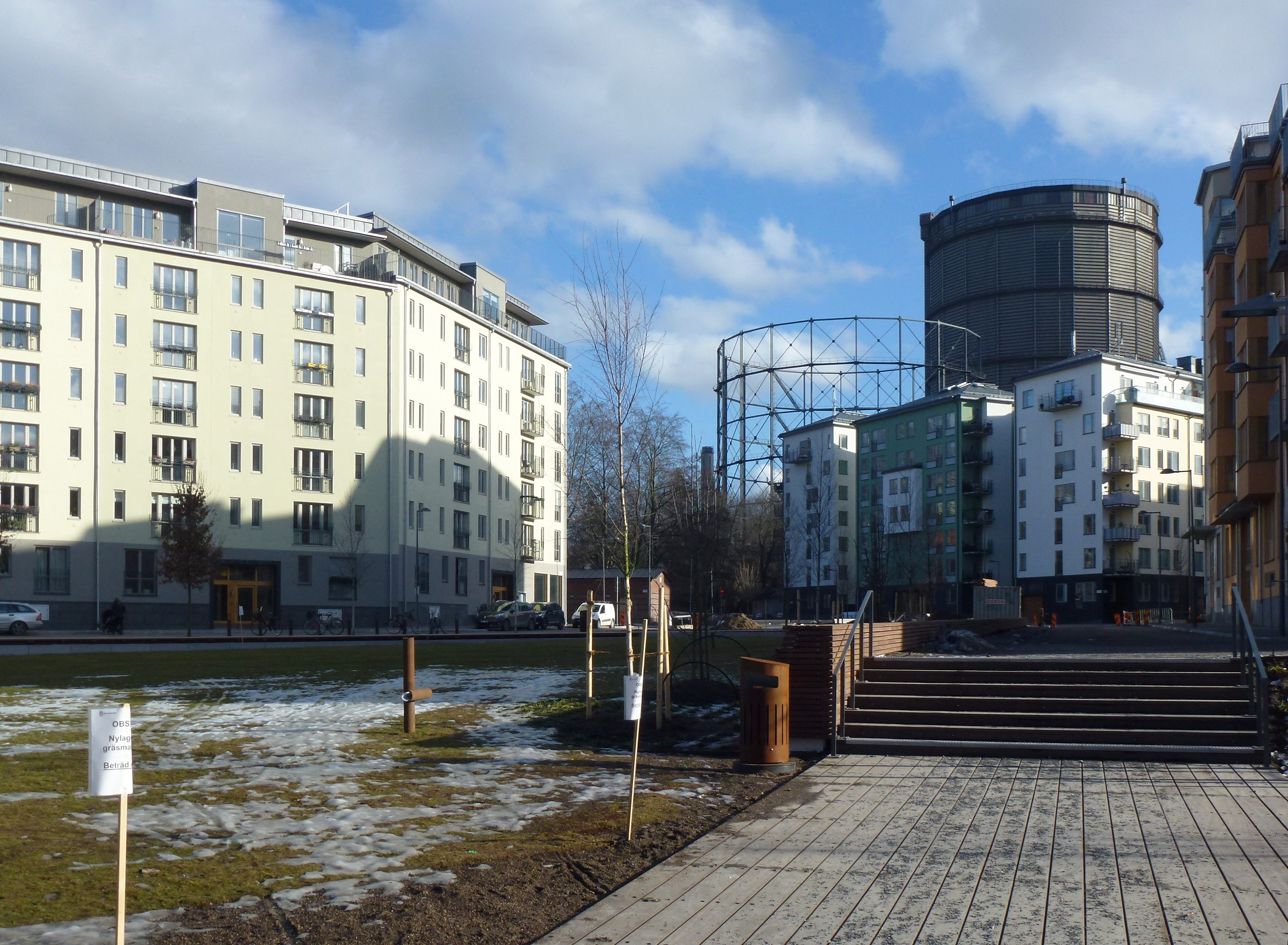

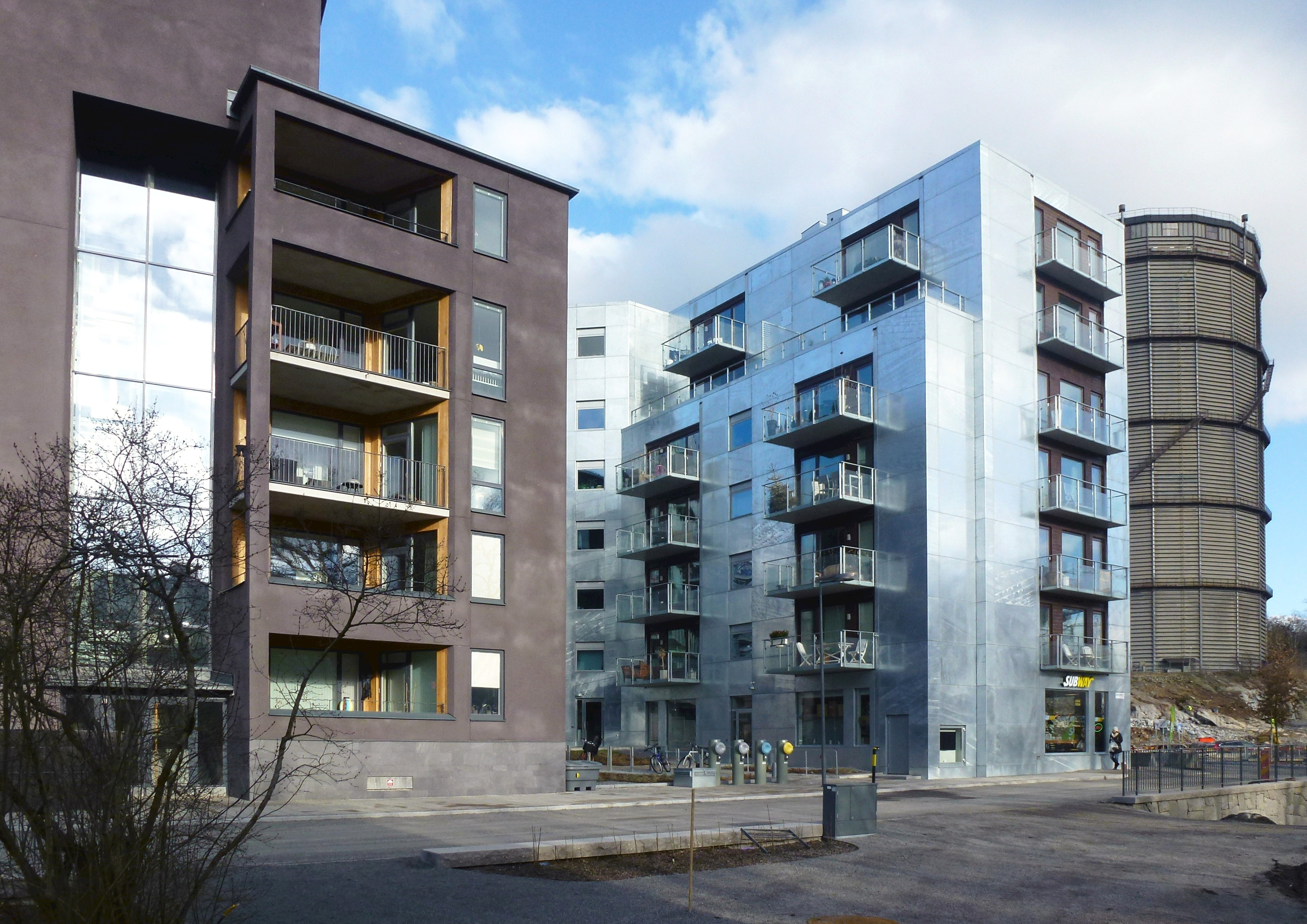

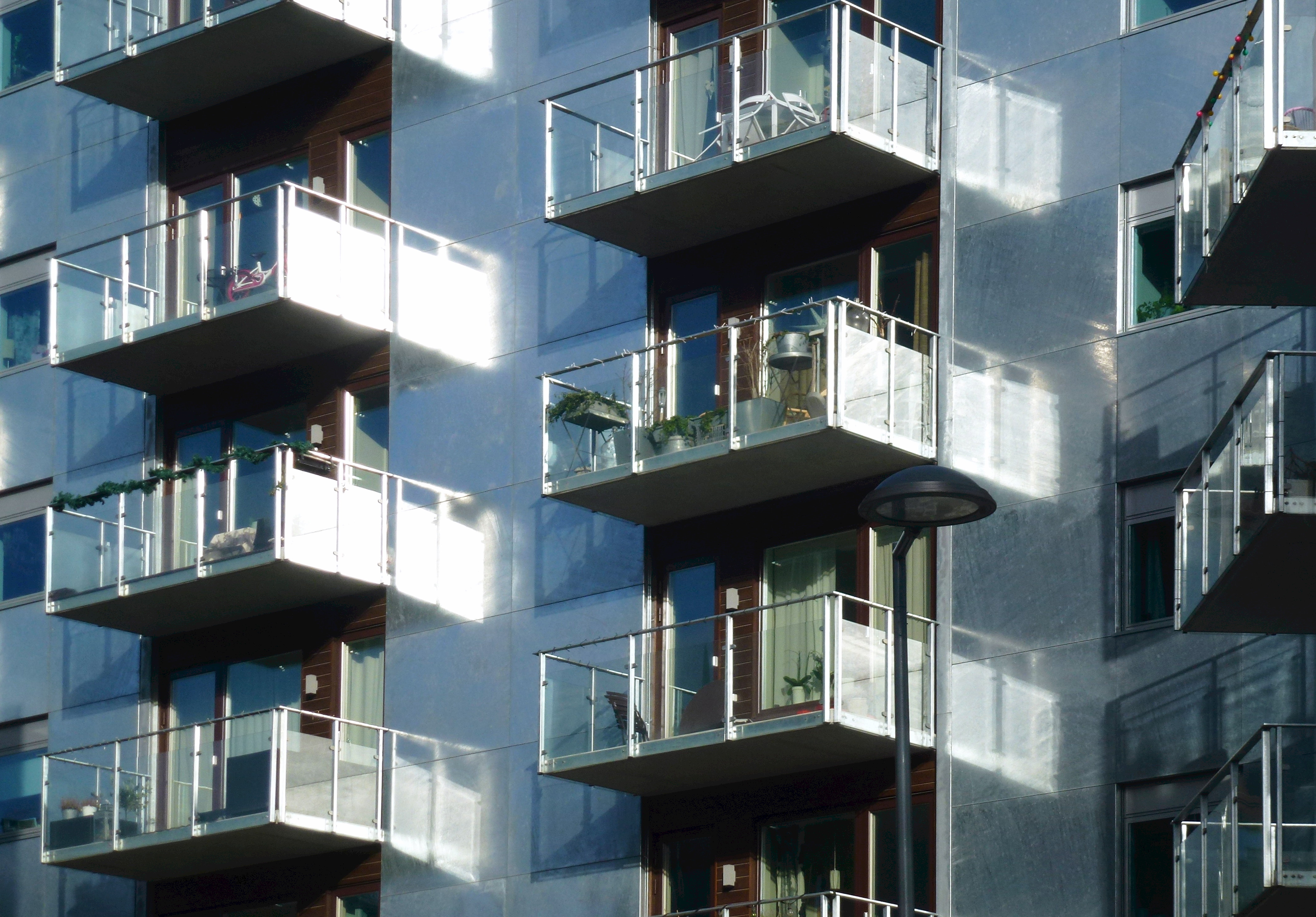

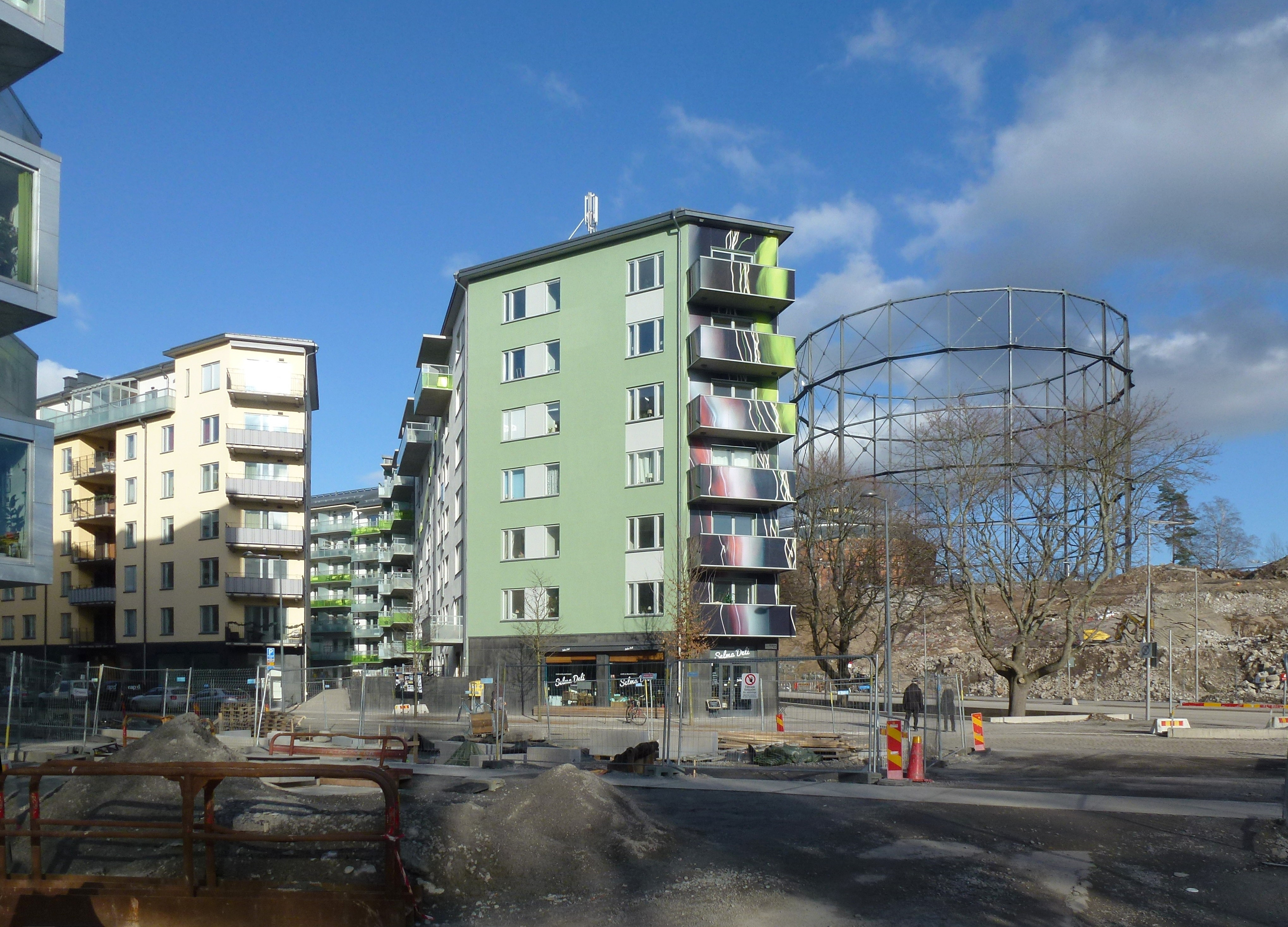
