= Stockholm City Centre =

Inner city

Coordinates: 59.3300°N 18.0500°E

Stockholm Municipality's boroughs: Stockholm City Centre covers the eastern third. The map also shows South Stockholm's and West Stockholm's boroughs.

Stockholm City Centre (Swedish: Stockholms innerstad, Innerstaden, Inre staden) is in Stockholm Municipality, also known as the City of Stockholm, part of the Stockholm urban area in Sweden.

Since 2007, Stockholm City Centre has been organized into four stadsdelsområden (sometimes translated as "boroughs"): Kungsholmen, Södermalm, Norrmalm, and Östermalm. Before 2007, it was organized into five boroughs: Katarina-Sofia borough, Kungsholmen borough, Maria-Gamla stan borough, Norrmalm borough, and Östermalm borough.

The border between the historical provinces of Södermanland and Uppland splits Stockholm City Centre in two parts. 179,185 people live on an area of 28.05 km^{2} in the northern (Uppland) part, which gives a density of 6,388.06/km^{2}. The same data for the southern (Södermanland) part is 103,646 people on 7.44 km^{2}, giving a density of 13,930.91/km^{2}. This border is purely historical and has no administrative significance.

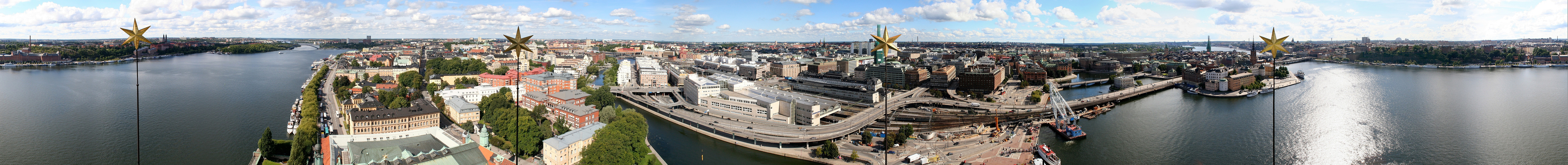
Stockholm City Centre

== Districts ==
Sortable table
District	Area (ha)	Population (31 December 2007)	Density (/ha)	Borough	Province
Djurgården	290	788	3	Östermalm	Uppland
Fredhäll	38	4,958	130	Kungsholmen	Uppland
Gustav Vasa	80	12,911	161	Norrmalm	Uppland
Gärdet	459	18,158	40	Östermalm	Uppland
Hedvig Eleonora	58	10,387	179	Östermalm	Uppland
Hjorthagen-Värtahamnen	174	2,225	13	Östermalm	Uppland
Jakob	62	201	3	Norrmalm	Uppland
Klara	71	1,597	22	Norrmalm	Uppland
Kristineberg	63	5,572	88	Kungsholmen	Uppland
Kungsholm	107	18,465	173	Kungsholmen	Uppland
Lilla Essingen	23	4,519	196	Kungsholmen	Uppland
Mariatorget	62	14,099	227	Maria-Gamla stan	Södermanland
Marieberg	66	2,700	41	Kungsholmen	Uppland
Mellersta Högalid	54	9,914	184	Maria-Gamla stan	Södermanland
Norra Adolf Fredrik	19	3,816	201	Norrmalm	Uppland
Norra Johannes	66	9,043	137	Norrmalm	Uppland
Norra Högalid	65	13,166	203	Maria-Gamla stan	Södermanland
Norra Sofia	58	7,721	133	Katarina-Sofia	Södermanland
Oscars Kyrka	116	15,271	132	Östermalm	Uppland
Reimersholme-Långholmen	52	2,349	45	Maria-Gamla stan	Södermanland
Roslagstull	9	2,713	301	Norrmalm	Uppland
Stadshagen	63	2,258	36	Kungsholmen	Uppland
Stora Essingen	72	3,954	55	Kungsholmen	Uppland
Storkyrkan	42	3,017	72	Maria-Gamla stan	Södermanland
Stureplan-Lärkstaden	71	8,104	114	Östermalm	Uppland
Södra Adolf Fredrik	35	3,703	106	Norrmalm	Uppland
Södra Hammarbyhamnen	125	10,615	85	Katarina-Sofia	Södermanland
Södra Högalid	72	4,155	58	Katarina-Sofia	Södermanland
Södra Johannes	15	2,011	134	Norrmalm	Uppland
Södra Sofia	74	11,015	149	Katarina-Sofia	Södermanland
Södra Station	18	4,844	269	Katarina-Sofia	Södermanland
Tekniska Högskolan	156	3,442	22	Östermalm	Uppland
Universitetet	476	3,131	7	Östermalm	Uppland
Västra Katarina	85	13,220	156	Katarina-Sofia	Södermanland
Västra Matteus	84	14,272	170	Kungsholmen	Uppland
Östra Katarina	85	19,855	234	Katarina-Sofia	Södermanland
Östra Matteus	51	12,325	242	Kungsholmen	Uppland
Östra Sankt Göran	53	14,079	266	Kungsholmen	Uppland
Total	3577	296,323	83		

== See also ==
- South Stockholm
- West Stockholm
- Stockholm City railway station
