= Christoffer Järkeborn =

Swedish politician (born 1985)

Member of the Riksdag
- In office 7 February 2011 – 3 June 2011
- Preceded by: Gustav Blix
- Succeeded by: Gustav Blix
- Constituency: Stockholm Municipality

Personal details
- Born: 27 February 1985 (age 41)
- Party: Moderate Party
- Spouse: Fredrik Kempe (m. 2013; div. 2020)

Carl Christoffer Järkeborn (born 27 February 1985) is a Swedish politician. From February to June 2011, he was a member of the Riksdag. He served as municipal commissioner of Södermalm from 2010 to 2014 and from 2018 to 2022. From 2013 to 2020, he was married to Fredrik Kempe.
