= 2010 Stockholm municipal election =

Swedish local election

- September 30, 2010

101 51 seats needed for a majority
- Turnout: 81.6%
	First party	Second party	Third party
Party	Moderate	Social Democrats	Green
Alliance	The Alliance	Red-Greens	Red-Greens
Last election	41 seats, 37.2%	27 seats, 24.4%	10 seats, 9.2%
Seats won	38	25	16
Seat change	–3	–2	+6
Popular vote	184,533	121,273	74,437
Percentage	34.4%	22.6%	13.9%
Swing	–2.9	–1.8	+4.7
	Fourth party	Fifth party	Sixth party
Party	Liberals	Left	Centre
Alliance	The Alliance	Red-Greens	The Alliance
Last election	10 seats, 9.6%	9 seats, 7.8%	1 seat, 3.1%
Seats won	10	8	3
Seat change	±0	–1	+2
Popular vote	53,770	39,920	21,335
Percentage	10.0%	7.4%	4.0%
Swing	+0.4	–0.5	+0.8
	Seventh party
Party	Christian Democrats
Alliance	The Alliance
Last election	3 seats, 3.9%
Seats won	1
Seat change	–2
Popular vote	18,705
Percentage	3.5%
Swing	–0.4
Chairperson before election
Bo Bladholm
Moderate
Elected Chairperson
Margareta Björk
Moderate

The 2010 Stockholm municipal election was held on 19 September 2010, concurrently with the 2010 Swedish general election. The election determined how many seats each party would be allocated on the 101-member Stockholm city council (Stockholms kommunfullmäktige) through a system of proportional representation. A total of 541,716 votes were cast in this election, for a total voter turnout of 81.58%

This election confirmed the trend of the Green Party winning voters in the Swedish capital and other major urban areas in Sweden. The Sweden Democrats - for the first time winning seats in the national parliament - had a significantly lower share of votes in the Stockholm election, receiving only 2.62% of the votes (5.70% on national level).

== Results ==
Election results

Party		Votes			Seats		
Party		%	±	#	#	±	%
m	Moderate Party; Moderaterna	34.38%	▼2.86	184,533	38	▼3	37.6%
s	Social Democrats; Socialdemokraterna	22.60%	▼1,82	121,273	25	▼2	24.8%
mp	Green Party; Miljöpartiet	13.87%	▲4.67	74,437	16	▲6	15.8%
fp	People's Party; Folkpartiet	10.02%	▲0.38	53,770	10	±0	9.9%
v	Left Party; Vänsterpartiet	7.44%	▼0.47	39,920	8	▼1	7.9%
c	Centre Party; Centerpartiet	3.98%	▲0.83	21,335	3	▲2	3.0%
kd	Christian Democrats; Kristdemokraterna	3.49%	▼0.42	18,705	1	▼2	1.0%
Parties that failed to win seats:
sd	Swedish Democrats; Sverigedemokraterna	2.62%	▲0.99	14,085	0	±0	—N/a
fi	Feminist Initiative; Feminist initiativ	1.16%	▲0.02	6,216	0	±0	—N/a
rs	Socialist Justice Party; Rättvisepartiet Socialisterna	0.15%	▲0.08	790	0	±0	—N/a
k	Communist Party; Kommunistiska partiet	0.07%	▼0.02	402	0	±0	—N/a
	Popvox	0.05%	▲0.05	258	0	±0	—N/a
nd	National Democrats; Nationaldemokraterna	0.03%	▼0.04	147	0	±0	—N/a
	Communist League; Kommunistiska förbundet	—N/a	—N/a	16	0	±0	—N/a
	Mosebacke Democrats; Mosebackedemokraterna	—N/a	—N/a	4	0	±0	—N/a
	Write-in parties	0.15%	▼1.25	792	0	±0	—N/a
Party blocs:
Alliance/coalition		Votes			Seats		
Alliance/coalition		%	±	#	#	±	%
	The Alliance; Alliansen m + fp + c+ kd	51.8%	▼2.08	278,343	52	▼3	51.5%
	Red-Greens; De rödgröna s + mp + v	43.9%	▲2.37	235,630	48	▲3	48.5%

== See also ==
- Elections in Sweden
- List of political parties in Sweden
- City of Stockholm
