= 2014 Stockholm municipal election =

Swedish local election

- September 14, 2014
Party	Moderate	Social Democrats	Green
Last election	28 seats, 28.2%	24 seats, 22%	16 seats, 14.3%
Party	Liberals	Left	Sweden Democrats
Last election	9 seats, 8.3%	10 seats, 8.9%	6 seats, 5.2%
Party	Centre	Feminist Initiative	Christian Democrats
Last election	3 seats, 4.7%	3 seats, 4.6%	2 seats, 3.3%

As part of the 2014 Swedish general election, an election to the Stockholm Municipal Council was held on 14 September 2014, electing all 101 members of the Stockholm Municipal Council through a modified form of the Sainte-Laguë method of party-list proportional representation.

Before the 2014 election, the four parties of the center-right Alliance held a majority in the Stockholm Council, with 52 of the 101 seats.

== Opinion polling ==
Polling period	Polling agency	Alliance Parties				Red-Green Parties			Other		Alliance (M, L, KD, C)	R-G (S, V, MP)	Lead
Polling period	Polling agency	M	L	C	KD	S	MP	V	SD	Other	Alliance (M, L, KD, C)	R-G (S, V, MP)	Lead
2014 Election		27.2%	8.3%	4.7%	3.3%	21.2%	14.3%	8.9%	5.2%	6.2%	43.4%	45.2%	+1.8
Sep 2013	DN/Ipsos	29.9%	8.9%	2.4%	1.6%	26.5%	16.8%	9.8%	2.8%	1.3%	42.9%	53.1%	+10.2
Oct 2012	TV4/Novus	31.8%	7.8%	2.5%	2.1%	25.2%	14.1%	9.5%	5.4%	1.5%	44.2%	48.8%	+4.6
Sep 2012	DN/Ipsos	34.8%	10.4%	4.0%	3.5%	21.9%	14.3%	7.3%	2.3%	1.4%	52.7%	43.6%	+9.2
2010 Election		34.4%	10.0%	4.0%	3.5%	22.6%	13.9%	7.4%	2.6%	1.6%	51.9%	43.9%	+8.0
