= Rinkeby-Kista =

- Borough of Stockholm
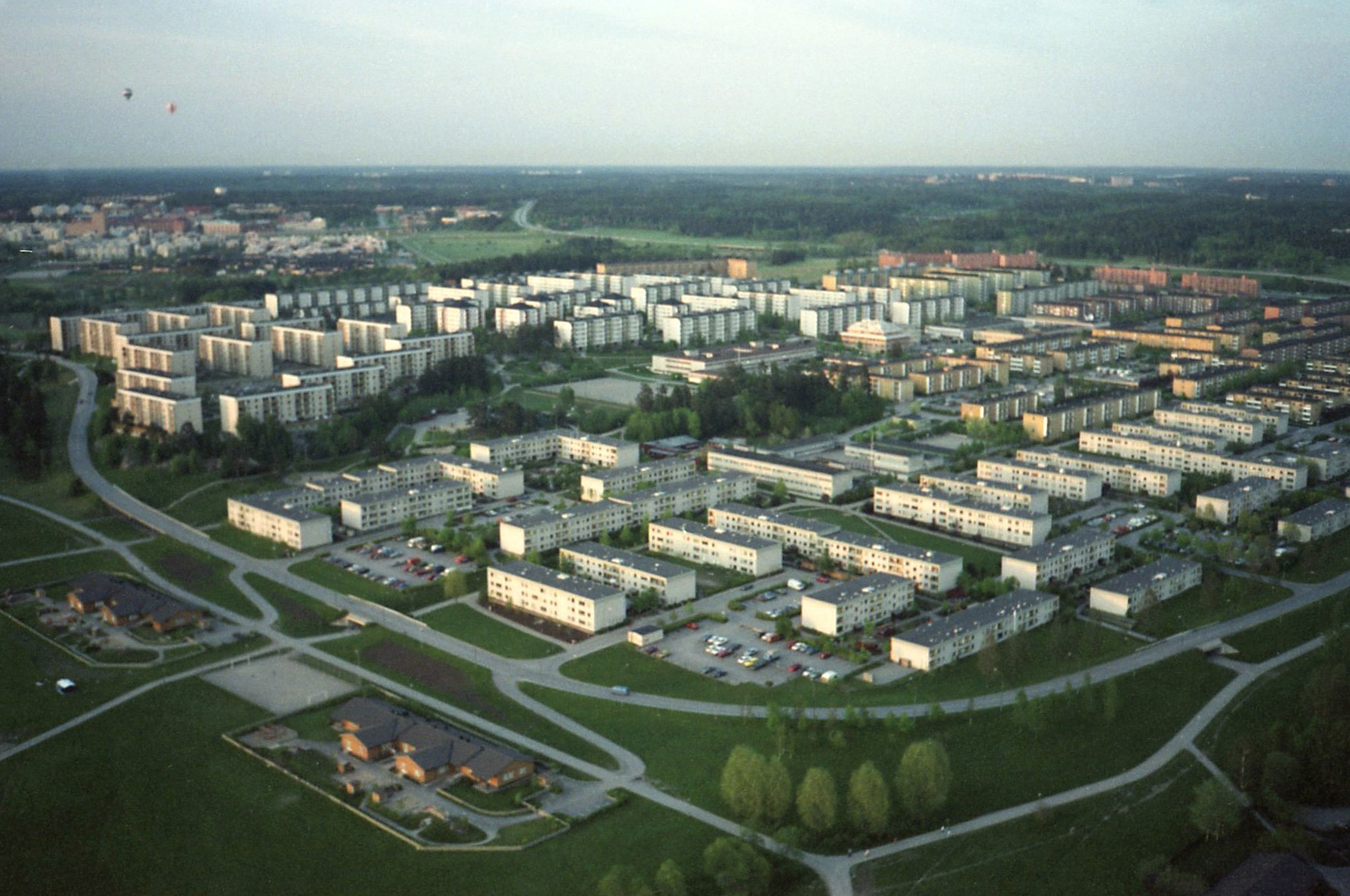
- Rinkeby

- Location of Rinkeby-Kista shown in yellow
- Coordinates: 59.401°N 17.944°E
- Country: Sweden
- Municipality: Stockholm Municipality
- Municipality subdivision: Västerort
- Established: 2007

Government
  - Type: Municipal assembly
  - Municipal commissioner: Bo Sundin (M)

Area
  - Total: 1,200 ha (3,000 acres)

Population (2014)
  - Total: 48,828
- Time zone: UTC+1 (CET)
  - Summer (DST): UTC+2 (CEST)
- Postal code: 163--, 164--
- Area code: 08
- Website: Stockholm.se

Rinkeby-Kista was a borough (stadsdelsområde) in Stockholm, Sweden. The borough is located in Västerort.

== Overview ==
The districts that make up the borough are Akalla, Husby, Kista, and Rinkeby. The population of Rinkeby-Kista borough is 48,604 as of December 2015.

The borough was formed on January 1, 2007, when Kista borough and Rinkeby borough were merged.
