= Maria-Gamla Stan =

Borough of Stockholm

Maria-Gamla Stan was a borough (stadsdelsområde) in central Stockholm, Sweden until January 1, 2007, named after the Maria (actually Maria Magdalena) parish and the Stockholm Old Town in the borough.

After being introduced as an administrative division in Stockholm in 1996, Maria-Gamla Stan grew when it merged with the former borough of Hornstull in 1999. After western half of Södermalm and the island districts of Gamla Stan, Långholmen, Reimersholme and Riddarholmen. The islands of Årsta holmar in Årsta were also organized in Maria-Gamla stan. The population as of 2004 was 64,150 on an area of 4.62 km^{2}, giving it a density of 13,885/km^{2}.

In 2007, the Maria-Gamla stan merged with Katarina-Sofia to form the Södermalm borough.
