= Districts of Sweden =

Part of a Municipality/Borough in Sweden

Municipalities in Sweden are in some rare cases divided into smaller districts or urban districts, and are sometimes assigned administrative boards responsible for certain areas of governance in their respective areas. These districts are not specified by national Swedish law, but rather are created by individual municipalities, and thus the Swedish names of these districts vary greatly from municipality to municipality, including kommundelar, stadsdelar, stadsdelområden, primärområden, or stadsdelsnämndsområden. The degree of administrative autonomy of these districts similarly varies greatly, but is normally very limited.

On 1 January 2016 a new form of division of Sweden was introduced. This division is called registration districts (Swedish: distrikt). These are used for certain administrative purposes by some national authorities, such as land ownership and statistics. This is not the same as the urban districts which are divisions held by some municipalities.

== Stockholm ==
=== Overview ===
2023 administrative districts of Stockholm Municipality

Metropolitan Stockholm consists of 26 municipalities, each municipality is divided into smaller subdivisions/districts.

Stockholm Municipality uses the English term "city district departments" (stadsdelområde) to describe these subdivisions.

The districts were first created in 1997 to facilitate the efficiency of local government in Stockholm. The number of districts was reduced from 24 to 18 the following year, and reduced again to the 14 in 2007. Since the establishment of these districts, certain administrative tasks, such as school administration were re-centralized.

Each district has its own district administration, led by a district council, which is responsible for certain areas of municipal governance within their district, including pre-school education, park maintenance, local economic initiatives, elderly services, financial counseling, and refugee reception services. Individual district councils have no power over city planning or tax policy, both of which are retained by the central city council.

The councilors that serve on these district councils are often part-time politicians, also holding other employment. They are preferably residents of the district whose council they serve upon. The central city council itself is responsible for setting the budget, goals, and responsibilities of the district councils. The city council also appoints the members of each district council, so the political makeup of the district council resembles that of the central city council, not necessarily that of the district. The member of the district council are not elected in any fashion by the residents of the district in question.

Stockholm's districts are sometimes divided into smaller parts for statistical purposes, however these smaller districts have no administrative function in the city's governance.

=== Districts ===
As of 2024, Stockholm Municipality has eleven districts:

- Bromma
- Enskede-Årsta-Vantör
- Farsta
- Hägersten-Älvsjö
- Hässelby-Vällingby
- Järva
- Kungsholmen
- Norra innerstaden
- Skärholmen
- Skarpnäck
- Södermalm

2007 administrative districts of Stockholm Municipality

From 1997, Stockholm had 24 districts. On 1 January 1999, the number of districts were reduced to 18: Enskede and Årsta merged to Enskede-Årsta; Hässelby and Vällingby merged to Hässelby-Vällingby; Västerled joined Bromma; Söderled joined Farsta; Hornstull joined Maria-Gamla stan; and Hammarby was split between Skarpnäck och Katarina-Sofia.

On 1 January 2007, the number of districts were reduced to 14: Enskede-Årsta och Vantör merged to Enskede-Årsta-Vantör; Hägersten and Liljeholmen merged to Hägersten-Liljeholmen, Kista and Rinkeby merged to Rinkeby-Kista; and Maria-Gamla stan and Katarina-Sofia merged to Södermalm.

On 1 July 2020, Älvsjö and Hägersten-Liljeholmen merged to Hägersten-Älvsjö. On 1 July 2023, two new mergers occurred: Rinkeby-Kista and Spånga-Tensta merged to Järva; and Östermalm and Norrmalm to Norra innerstaden.

1997–1998	1999–2006	2007–2020	2020–2023	2023–present
Bromma	Bromma	Bromma	Bromma	Bromma
Västerled	Bromma	Bromma	Bromma	Bromma
Årsta	Enskede-Årsta	Enskede-Årsta-Vantör	Enskede-Årsta-Vantör	Enskede-Årsta-Vantör
Enskede	Enskede-Årsta	Enskede-Årsta-Vantör	Enskede-Årsta-Vantör	Enskede-Årsta-Vantör
Vantör	Vantör	Enskede-Årsta-Vantör	Enskede-Årsta-Vantör	Enskede-Årsta-Vantör
Farsta	Farsta	Farsta	Farsta	Farsta
Söderled	Farsta	Farsta	Farsta	Farsta
Älvsjö	Älvsjö	Älvsjö	Hägersten-Älvsjö	Hägersten-Älvsjö
Hägersten	Hägersten	Hägersten-Liljeholmen	Hägersten-Älvsjö	Hägersten-Älvsjö
Liljeholmen	Liljeholmen	Hägersten-Liljeholmen	Hägersten-Älvsjö	Hägersten-Älvsjö
Hässelby	Hässelby-Vällingby	Hässelby-Vällingby	Hässelby-Vällingby	Hässelby-Vällingby
Vällingby	Hässelby-Vällingby	Hässelby-Vällingby	Hässelby-Vällingby	Hässelby-Vällingby
Rinkeby	Rinkeby	Rinkeby-Kista	Rinkeby-Kista	Järva
Kista	Kista	Rinkeby-Kista	Rinkeby-Kista	Järva
Spånga-Tensta	Spånga-Tensta	Spånga-Tensta	Spånga-Tensta	Järva
Kungsholmen	Kungsholmen	Kungsholmen	Kungsholmen	Kungsholmen
Norrmalm	Norrmalm	Norrmalm	Norrmalm	Norra innerstaden
Östermalm	Östermalm	Östermalm	Östermalm	Norra innerstaden
Skärholmen	Skärholmen	Skärholmen	Skärholmen	Skärholmen
Skarpnäck	Skarpnäck	Skarpnäck	Skarpnäck	Skarpnäck
Hammarby	Skarpnäck	Skarpnäck	Skarpnäck	Skarpnäck
Hammarby	Katarina-Sofia	Södermalm	Södermalm	Södermalm
Katarina-Sofia	Katarina-Sofia	Södermalm	Södermalm	Södermalm
Hornstull	Maria-Gamla stan	Södermalm	Södermalm	Södermalm
Maria-Gamla stan	Maria-Gamla stan	Södermalm	Södermalm	Södermalm
24	18	14	13	11

== Gothenburg ==
=== Overview ===
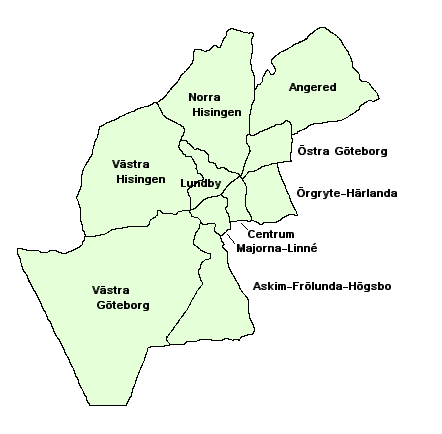
2012 administrative districts of Gothenburg Municipality

Gothenburg Municipality is also divided into subdivisions which it refers to as "districts" in English, though as with Stockholm's districts, they are often referred to as boroughs in unofficial contexts. The Swedish term used by the city council is stadsdelsnämndsområden (literally "city-part committee area"). These districts were created in 1990. Just like in Stockholm, these districts each have a local governing body which Gothenburg calls "district committees". These committees serve a nearly identical function to Stockholm's district councils, including recreation, local economic issues and social services, and the lower levels of the education system, and like Stockholm's councils, these committees are appointed by the centralized city council.

Gothenburg is divided into 21 districts, each with a district committee. These 21 districts can be further divided into 94 subdivisions (called primärområden/primary areas) which exist only for statistical and organizational purposes, and serve no administrative function.

=== Districts ===
The 21 districts of Gothenburg and the primärområden enclosed within each:

- Askim
  - Askim
  - Hovås
  - Billdal
- Backa
  - Backa
  - Brunnsbo
  - Skogome
  - Skälltorp
- Bergsjön
  - Västra Bergsjön
  - Östra Bergsjön
- Biskopsgården
  - Norra Biskopsgården
  - Södra Biskopsgården
  - Jättesten
  - Svartedalen
  - Länsmansgården
- Centrum
  - Guldheden
  - Heden
  - Johanneberg
  - Krokslätt
  - Landala
  - Stampen
  - Vasastaden
  - Lorensberg
  - Inom Vallgraven
- Frölunda
  - Järnbrott
  - Tofta
  - Ruddalen
  - Frölunda Torg
- Gunnared
  - Lövgärdet
  - Rannebergen
  - Gårdstensbergen
  - Angereds Centrum
- Härlanda
  - Härlanda
  - Kålltorp
  - Torpa
  - Björkekärr
- Högsbo
  - Kaverös
  - Flatås
  - Högsbohöjd
  - Högsbotorp
  - Högsbo
- Kortedala
  - Gamlestaden
  - Utby
  - Södra Kortedala
  - Norra Kortedala
- Kärra-Rödbo
  - Kärra
  - Rödbo
- Linnéstaden
  - Masthugget
  - Änggården
  - Haga
  - Annedal
  - Olivedal
- Lundby
  - Sannegården
  - Brämaregården
  - Kvillebäcken
  - Slättadamm
  - Kärrdalen
- Lärjedalen
  - Hammarkullen
  - Hjällbo
  - Eriksbo
  - Agnesberg
  - Linnarhult
  - Gunnilse
  - Bergum
- Majorna
  - Kungsladugård
  - Sanna
  - Majorna
  - Stigberget
- Styrsö
  - Styrsö
- Torslanda
  - Hjuvik
  - Nolered
  - Björlanda
  - Arendal
- Tuve-Säve
  - Tuve
  - Säve
- Tynnered
  - Bratthammar
  - Guldringen
  - Skattegården
  - Ängås
  - Önnered
  - Grevegården
  - Näset
  - Kannebäck
- Älvsborg
  - Fiskebäck
  - Långedrag
  - Hagen
  - Grimmered
- Örgryte
  - Olskroken
  - Redbergslid
  - Bagaregården
  - Kallebäck
  - Skår
  - Överås
  - Kärralund
  - Lunden

== Malmö ==
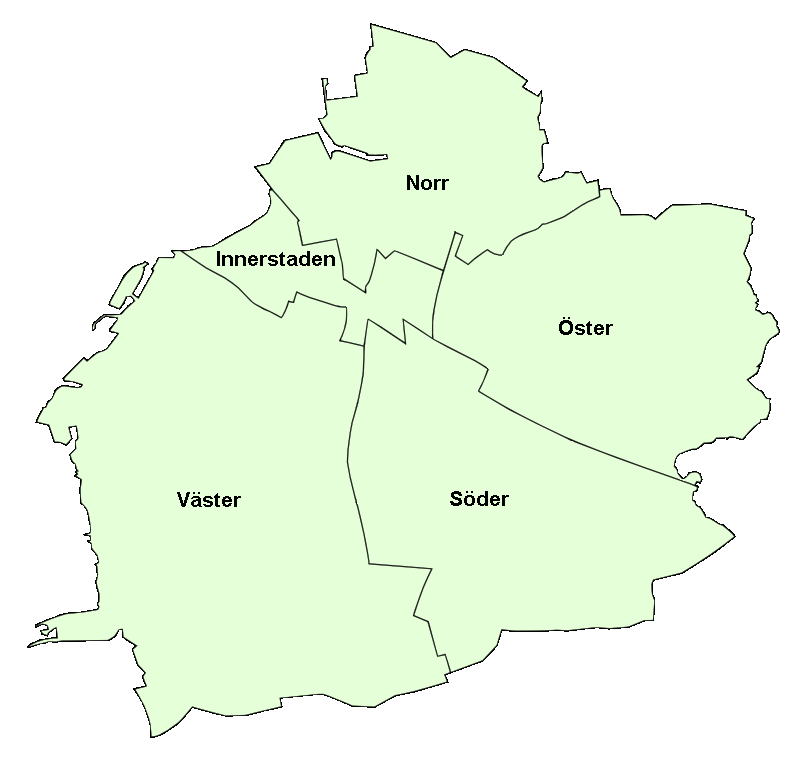
City districts of Malmö

=== Overview ===
Malmö Municipality is divided into five districts (stadsområden). These districts each have a board or council called a stadsdelsfullmäktige, each consisting of eleven members, which are responsible for various local administrative tasks. In Malmö, the district councils are also responsible for assisting members of the community in contacting their politicians or navigating their way through government agencies.

=== Districts ===
These are the five districts of Malmö:

- Väster
- Innerstaden
- Norr
- Söder
- Öster

== Other examples ==
Other smaller municipalities in Sweden also use municipal subdivisions for official purposes, however these are not always administrative. For example, Strängnäs Municipality uses district councils (kommundelsråd) which serve a purely advisory function and have no administrative power.

Borås Municipality is divided into ten districts (kommundelar), each with a district council (kommundelsnnämd) responsible for pre-school and primary school, recreational services, and services for the elderly.

Torshälla is a region inside Eskilstuna Municipality which has withheld a degree of autonomy since merging with Eskilstuna, including their own city council (Torshälla stads nämnd).

Other municipalities that use districts for advisory or administrative purposes include Huddinge, Kalmar, Köping, Södertälje, Umeå and Västerås.

== See also ==
- Government of Sweden
- Swedish municipal assemblies
- Politics of Sweden
