= Östermalm (borough) =

- Borough of Stockholm
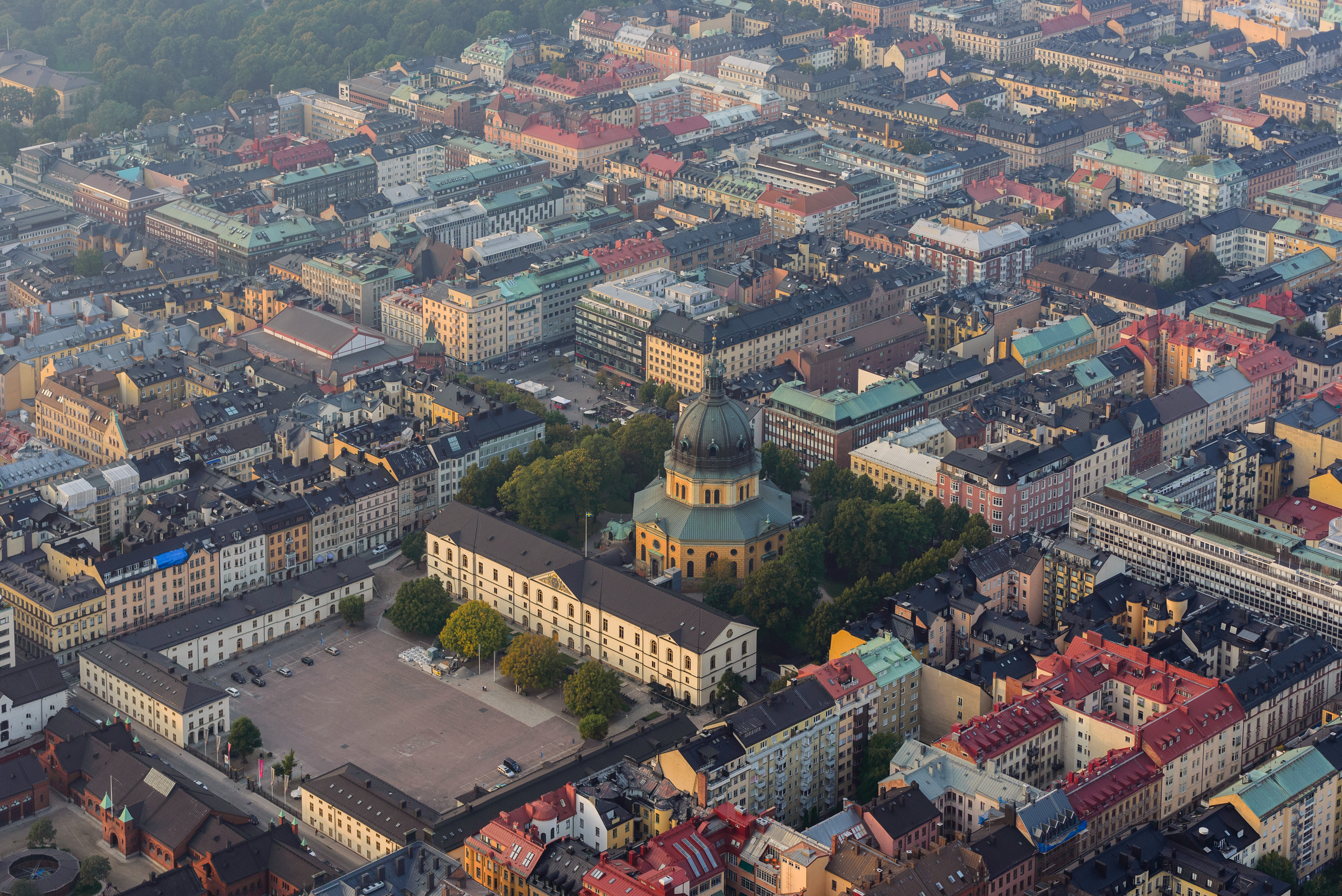
- Aerial view of Östermalm

- Location within Stockholm
- Coordinates: 59°20′17″N 18°05′12″E
- Country: Sweden
- Municipality: Stockholm
- Municipal part: Innerstaden
- Established: 1997

Area
  - Total: 18.00 km^{2} (6.95 sq mi)

Population (2014)
  - Total: 70,779
  - Density: 3,932/km^{2} (10,180/sq mi)
- Website: Östermalm on stockholm.se

Östermalm was a borough (stadsdelsområde) in central Stockholm,Sweden. It is named after the dominating district. Except Östermalm (proper) there are four districts in the borough: Djurgården, Hjorthagen, Ladugårdsgärdet (popularly known as Gärdet), and Norra Djurgården. Note that a portion of northern Östermalm is organized in Norrmalm borough. The population as of 2014 is 70,779 on an area of 18.00 km², which gives a density of 3,932.17/km².

== See also ==
- Norra Djurgårdsstaden
