= Kista (borough) =

Borough in Stockholm, Sweden

Kista was a borough (stadsdelsområde) in Stockholm, Sweden, until 1 January, 2007. It organised the districts of Akalla, Hansta, Husby and Kista. In 2007, Kista merged with the borough of Rinkeby to form the Rinkeby-Kista borough.
