= Katarina-Sofia =

Coordinates: 59°18′49″N 18°04′16″E

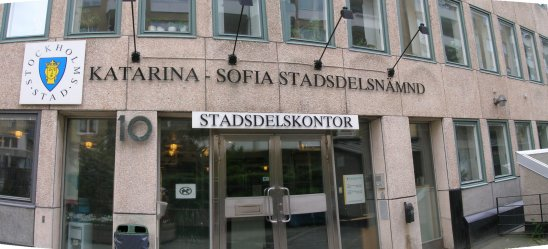
Katarina-Sofia

Katarina-Sofia was a borough (stadsdelsområde) in central Stockholm, named after the two parishes of Katarina and Sofia. Effective January 1, 2007, the borough merged with the borough of Maria-Gamla Stan to form the Södermalm borough.

Katarina-Sofia was made up of the eastern half of Södermalm and Hammarby Sjöstad (Södra Hammarbyhamnen). The population as of 2004 was 42,750 on an area of 3.36 km², which gave a density of 12,723.21/km².
