= Spånga-Tensta =

- Borough of Stockholm
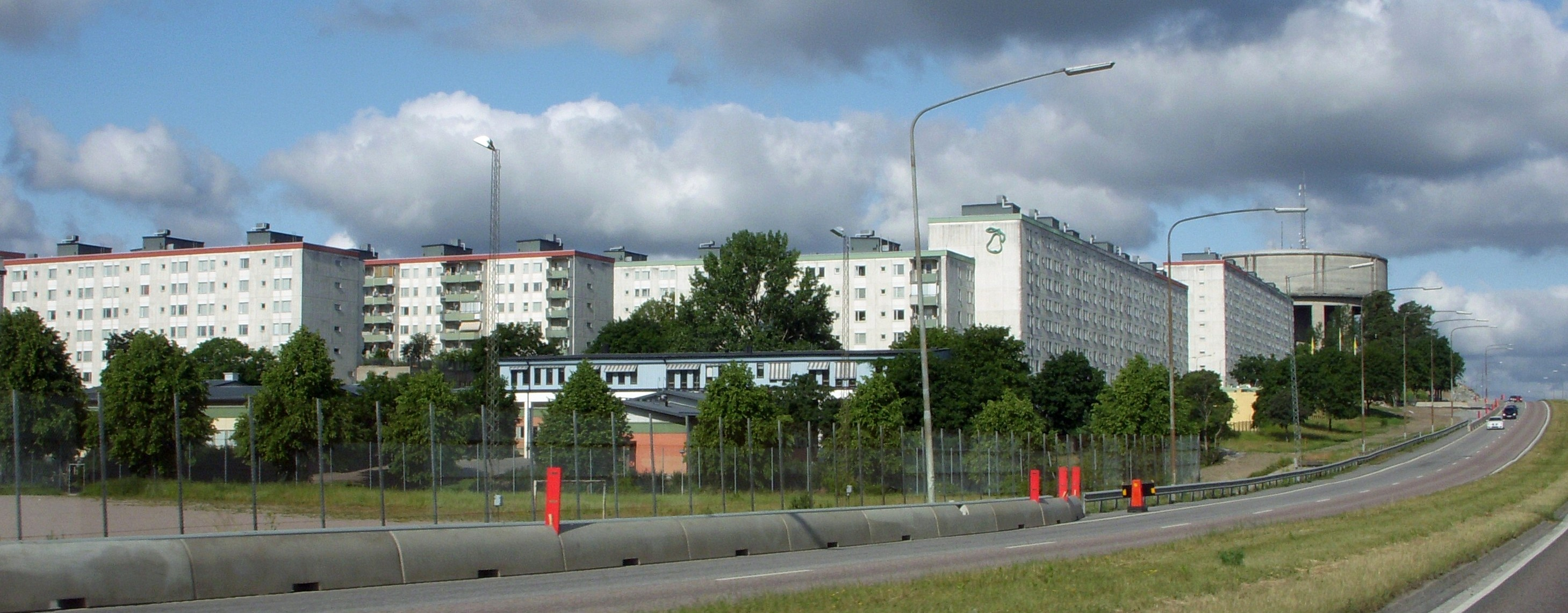
- View of Tensta

- Location within Stockholm
- Coordinates: 59°23′39″N 17°54′04″E
- Country: Sweden
- Municipality: Stockholm
- Municipal part: Västerort
- Established: 1997

Area
  - Total: 12.85 km^{2} (4.96 sq mi)

Population (2014)
  - Total: 39,082
  - Density: 3,041/km^{2} (7,877/sq mi)
- Website: Spånga-Tensta at stockholm.se

Spånga-Tensta was a borough (stadsdelsområde) located in Västerort in the western part of Stockholm, Sweden. The districts that make up the borough are Bromsten, Flysta, Lunda, Solhem, Sundby and Tensta. A large portion of Järvafältet is also located in Spånga-Tensta as well as in the districts of Akalla and Husby in neighboring Rinkeby-Kista borough.

The borough includes of the community of Spånga. The population as of 2004 is 34,448 on an area of 12.85 km^{2}, which gives a density of 2,680.78/km^{2}.

== Transport ==
The transport provided is:

- Rail: The Blue Line of the Stockholm Metro, running from Kungsträdgården in the city centre to Hjulsta station in the north west. It has two stations in the borough of Spånga-Tensta, Hjulsta and Tensta, both inaugurated in 1975. Commuter rail has one station, Spånga Station.
- Bus: Several bus routes serve the borough.
- Car: E18/Hjulstavägen runs on the north of Hjulsta and Tensta. When finished, the Förbifart Stockholm motorway will connect to E18 at Hjulsta.
