= Skärholmen (borough) =

- Borough of Stockholm
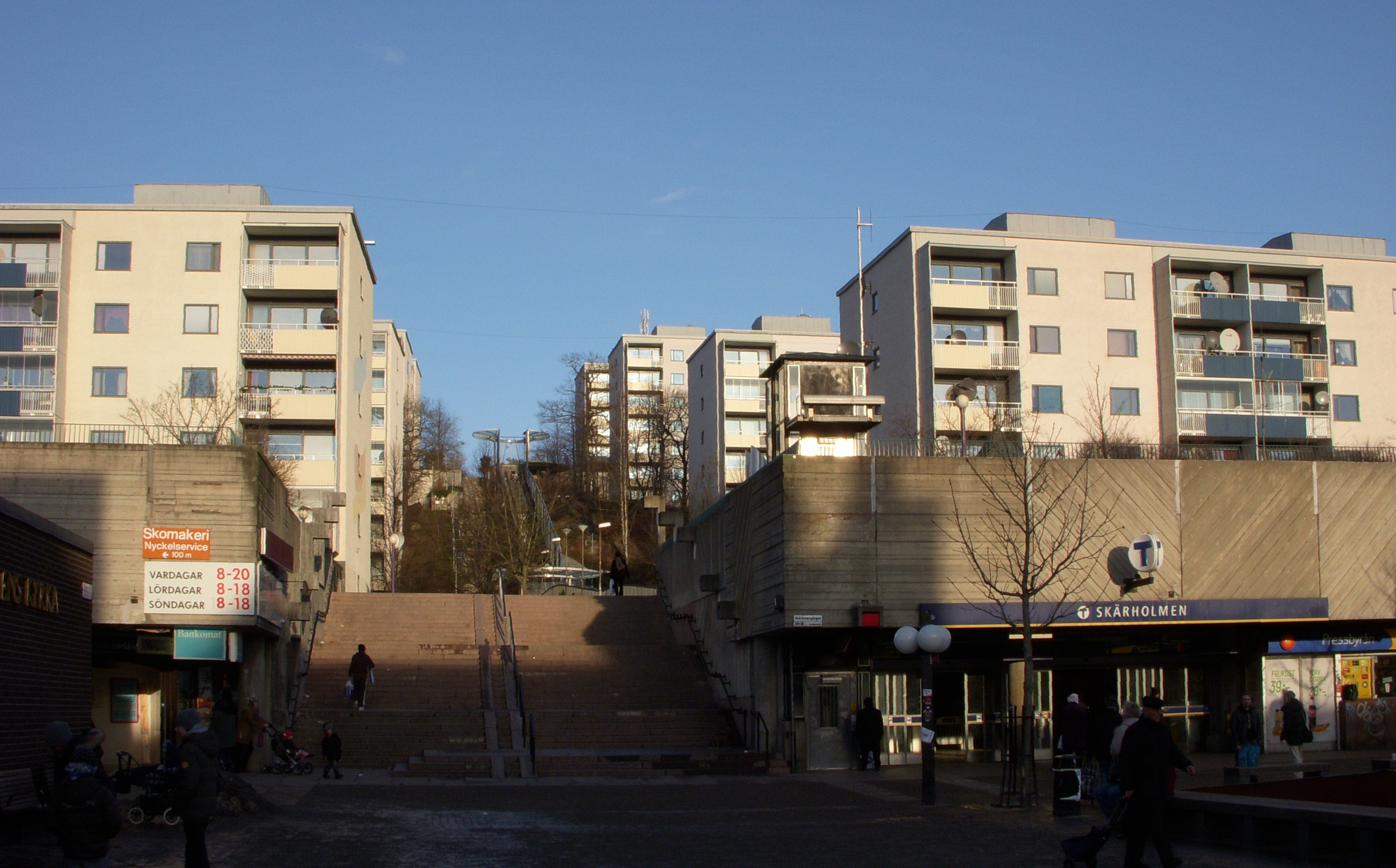
- Skärholmen Centrum

- Location within Stockholm
- Coordinates: 59°16′37″N 17°54′18″E
- Country: Sweden
- Municipality: Stockholm
- Municipal part: Söderort
- Established: 1997

Area
  - Total: 8.86 km^{2} (3.42 sq mi)

Population (2014)
  - Total: 35,740
  - Density: 4,030/km^{2} (10,400/sq mi)
- Website: Skärholmen on stockholm.se

Skärholmen is a borough (stadsdelsområde) of Söderort in the southern part of Stockholm.

== Overview ==
It is primarily made up of Skärholmen parish. The districts that make up the borough are Bredäng, Skärholmen, Sätra and Vårberg. The population as of 2014 is 35,740 on an area of 8.86 km^{2}, which gives a density of 3,800/km^{2}.
