= Kungsholmen (borough) =

- Borough of Stockholm
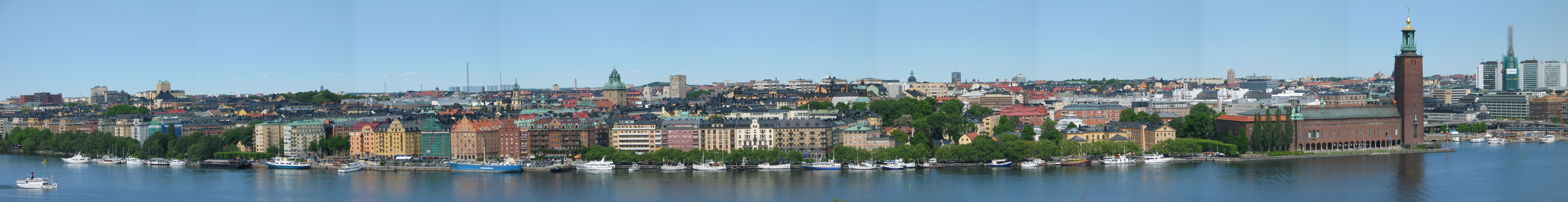
- Panorama of Kungsholmen, view from Södermalm. The City Hall is on the far right (June 2005, collage)

- Location within Stockholm
- Coordinates: 59°19′59″N 18°01′51″E
- Country: Sweden
- Municipality: Stockholm
- Municipal part: Innerstaden
- Established: 1997

Area
  - Total: 4.85 km^{2} (1.87 sq mi)

Population (2014)
  - Total: 68,016
  - Density: 14,000/km^{2} (36,300/sq mi)
- Website: Kungsholmen at stockholm.se

Kungsholmen (King's Islet) is a borough (stadsdelsområde) in central Stockholm, Sweden. It is named after the dominating district and island in the borough. Except Kungsholmen (proper) there are six districts in the borough: Fredhäll, Kristineberg, Lilla Essingen, Marieberg, Stadshagen and Stora Essingen. It is also equivalent to the parishes of Kungsholm, Sankt Göran and Essinge. The population as of 2004 is 54,283, of which 28,614 are female and 25,669 are male, on an area of 4.85 km², which gives a density of 10,977.73 per km².

== Gallery ==
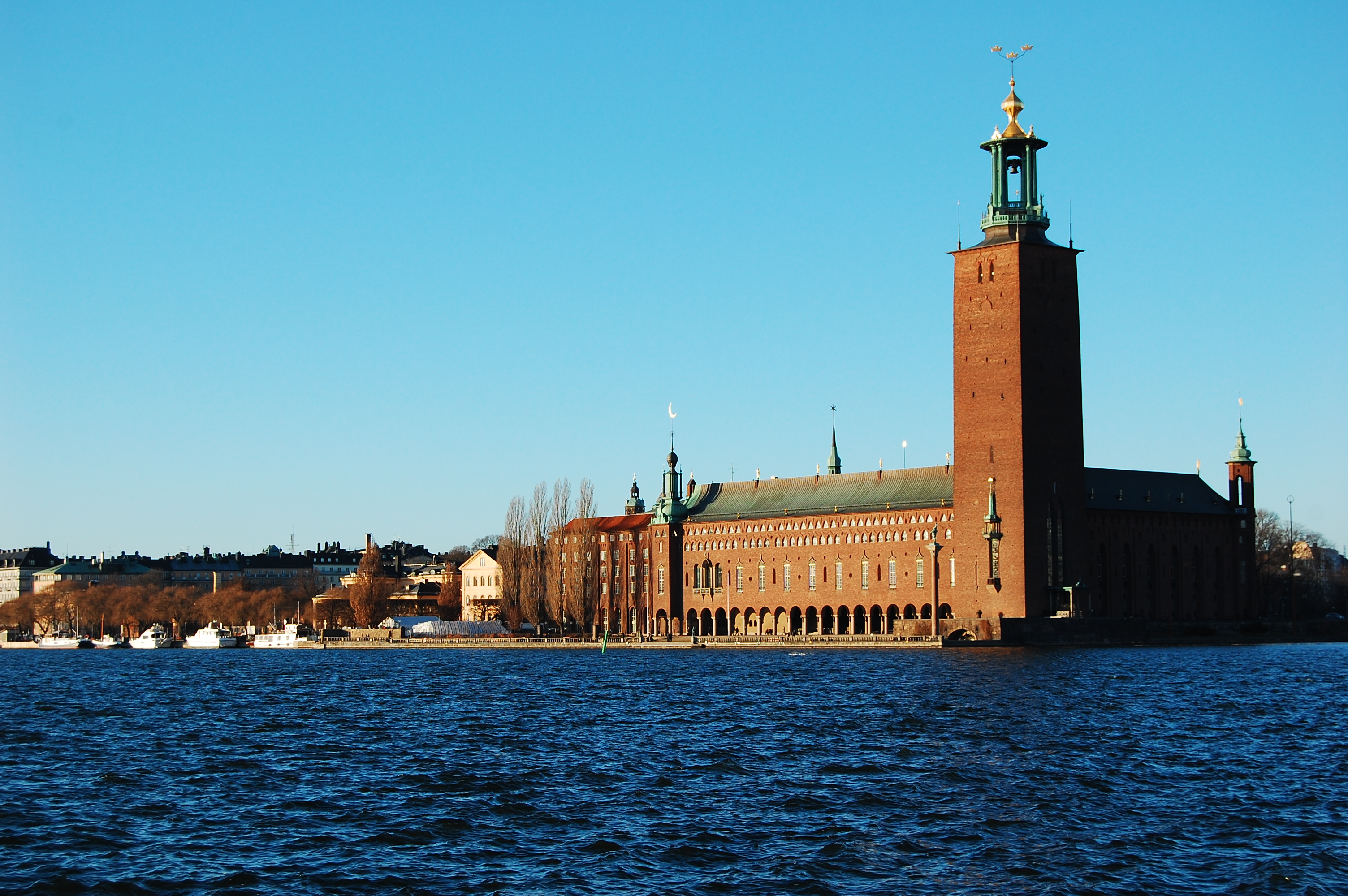
Stockholm City Hall

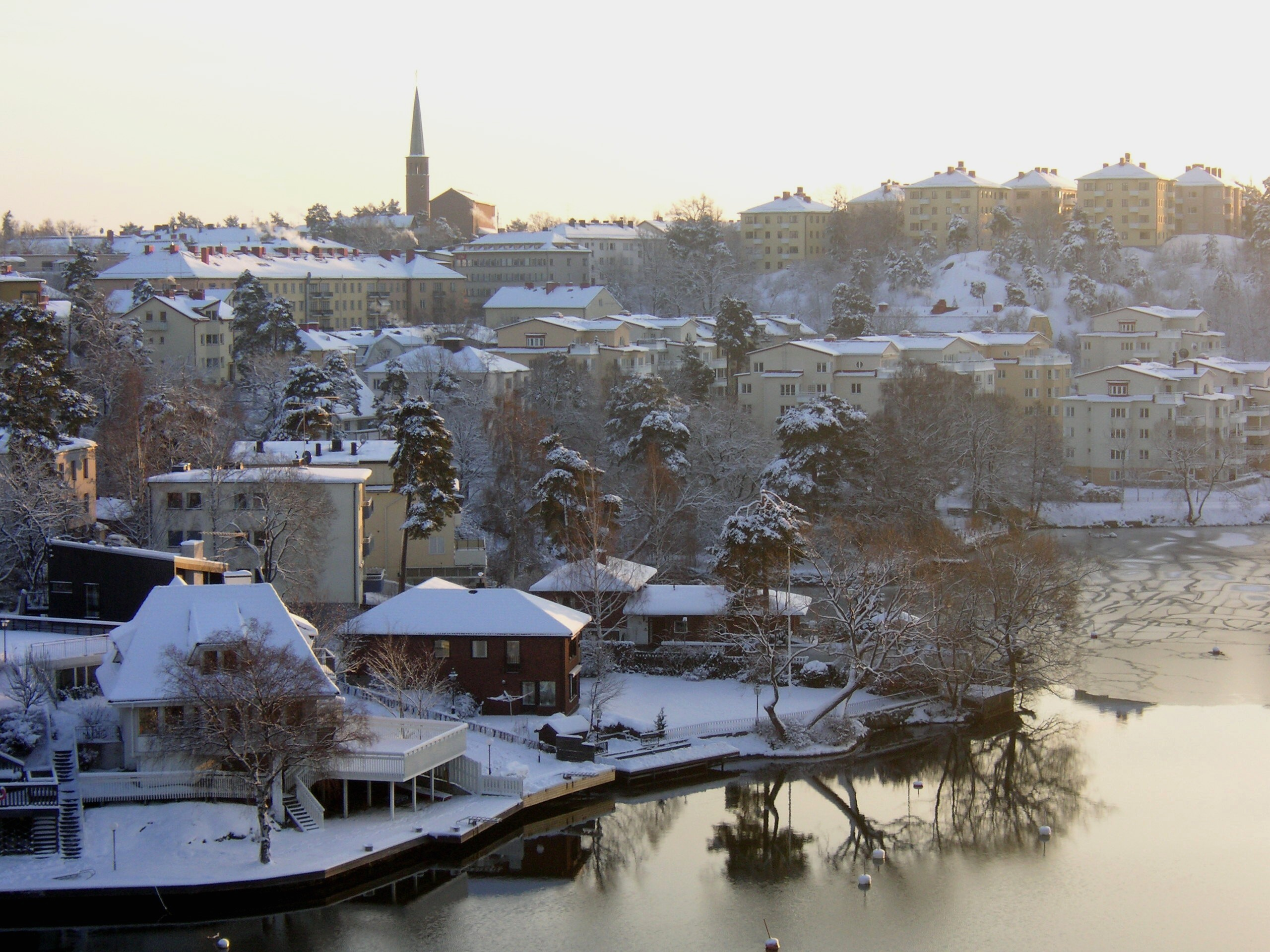
Stora Essingen
