= Norrmalm (borough) =

- Borough of Stockholm
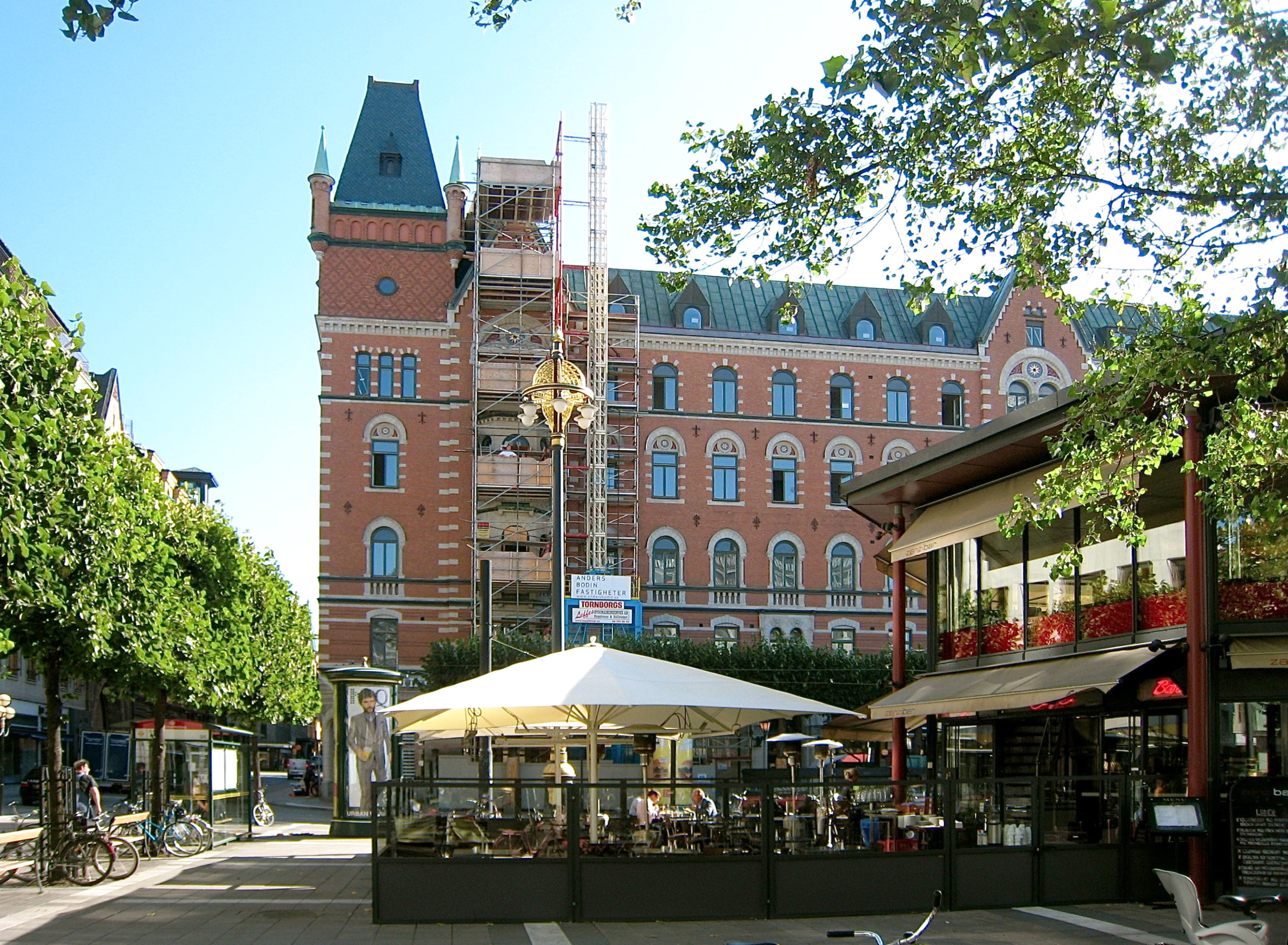
- The square "Norrmalmstorg"

- Location within Stockholm
- Coordinates: 59°20′30″N 18°02′50″E
- Country: Sweden
- Municipality: Stockholm
- Municipal part: Innerstaden
- Established: 2007

Area
  - Total: 4.95 km^{2} (1.91 sq mi)

Population (1997)
  - Total: 69,592
  - Density: 14,100/km^{2} (36,400/sq mi)
- Website: Norrmalm at stockholm.se

Norrmalm ("Northern city-borough") was a borough (stadsdelsområde) in central Stockholm, Sweden. It is named after the dominating district.

== Overview ==
Except Norrmalm (proper) there are two districts in the borough: Skeppsholmen and Vasastaden. A portion of northern Östermalm is also organized in Norrmalm borough. The population as of 2004 is 61,905 on an area of 4.95 km^{2}, which gives a density of 12,506.06/km^{2}. The most populous district is Vasastaden.
