= Södra Hammarbyhamnen =

Part of the inner city of Stockholm, Sweden

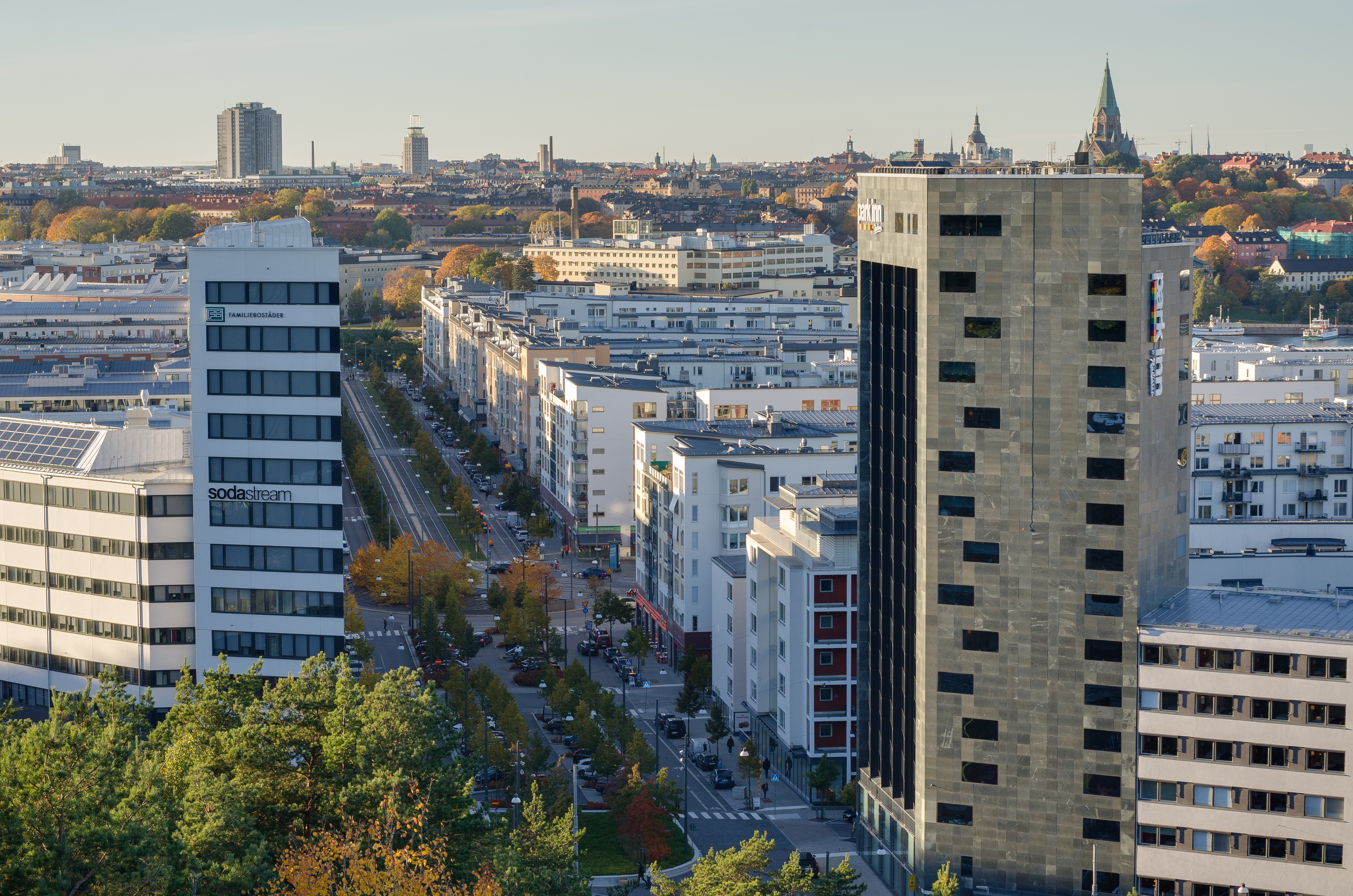
- Södra Hammarbyhamnen with Hammarby allé, view to the northwest, 2013.
- Nickname: Hammarby Sjöstad
- Interactive map of Södra Hammarbyhamnen
- Coordinates: 59°18′21.42″N 18°6′3.16″E
- Municipality: Stockholm Municipality
- District: City Centre
- Borough: Södermalm
- Province: Södermanland
- Established: 1 February 1948 (as Norra Hammarby in 1932)

Area
  - Total: 125 ha (310 acres)

Population (2021)
  - Total: 20,474
  - Density: 16,400/km^{2} (42,400/sq mi)
- Time zone: UTC+1 (CET)
  - Summer (DST): UTC+2 (CEST)
- Postal codes: 120 XX
- Post town: Stockholm

Södra Hammarbyhamnen (lit. 'Southern Hammarby Harbor') is a district in the southeastern part of Stockholm City Centre, Sweden. It was formerly an industrial area. It is part of the borough of Södermalm in the Municipality of Stockholm. Since the registration district belongs to the Stockholm Sofia, the municipality officially classifies it as part of the city centre, despite its location on the southern and eastern shores of Lake Hammarby.

It borders the districts of Södermalm, Årsta, Johanneshov, Hammarbyhöjden, and Björkhagen, as well as Tallbacken, Alphyddan, Henriksdal and Danviken in the Municipality of Nacka. The district consists of the following statistical sub-areas: Danviksklippan, Luma, Mårtensdal and Sickla udde. Since the district was transformed from an industrial and harbour area into a residential neighbourhood, the official name Södra Hammarbyhamnen has increasingly fallen out of use. Many people instead use the name Hammarby Sjöstad, or simply Sjöstaden (literally, "Lake City").

== History ==
The area originally belonged to the Hammarby gård, which was located in Nacka landskommun until it was incorporated into the City of Stockholm in 1930.

The water level in Lake Hammarby was lowered during the 1920s to create the Hammarbyleden, which opened in 1926. This established a new shipping route from Lake Mälaren, through Lake Hammarby and out into the Saltsjön/Baltic Sea. From Årstaviken, the Hammarby Lock leads into Lake Hammarby, and via the Danvik Canal, vessels can reach Saltsjön.

Over the years, several major industries have operated in the area. In 1928, General Motors established a facility here, where car parts shipped from the United States were assembled on site. In 1930, the Kooperativa Förbundet built the Luma Factory. The factory was established to break an international light bulb cartel. Other companies also operated in Södra Hammarbyhamnen, including the iron wholesaler Bröderna Edstrand, the timber company Fredells, the plumbing and heating wholesaler Ahlsell & Bernström, and the construction company Bröderna Hedlund.

Around the turn of the millennium, the area began its transformation into a residential district. Today, sand is unloaded here for the concrete industry, along with fuel for the local heating plant. The harbour tugboats were relocated here from the Stockholm Free Port in the early 1990s.

The design concept for the new residential district was inspired by Berlin, featuring enclosed city blocks while retaining open courtyards. Södra Hammarbyhamnen, better known colloquially as Hammarby Sjöstad, was also the proposed location for the Olympic Village for the 2004 Olympic Games, had Athens not been awarded the responsibility of hosting the event.

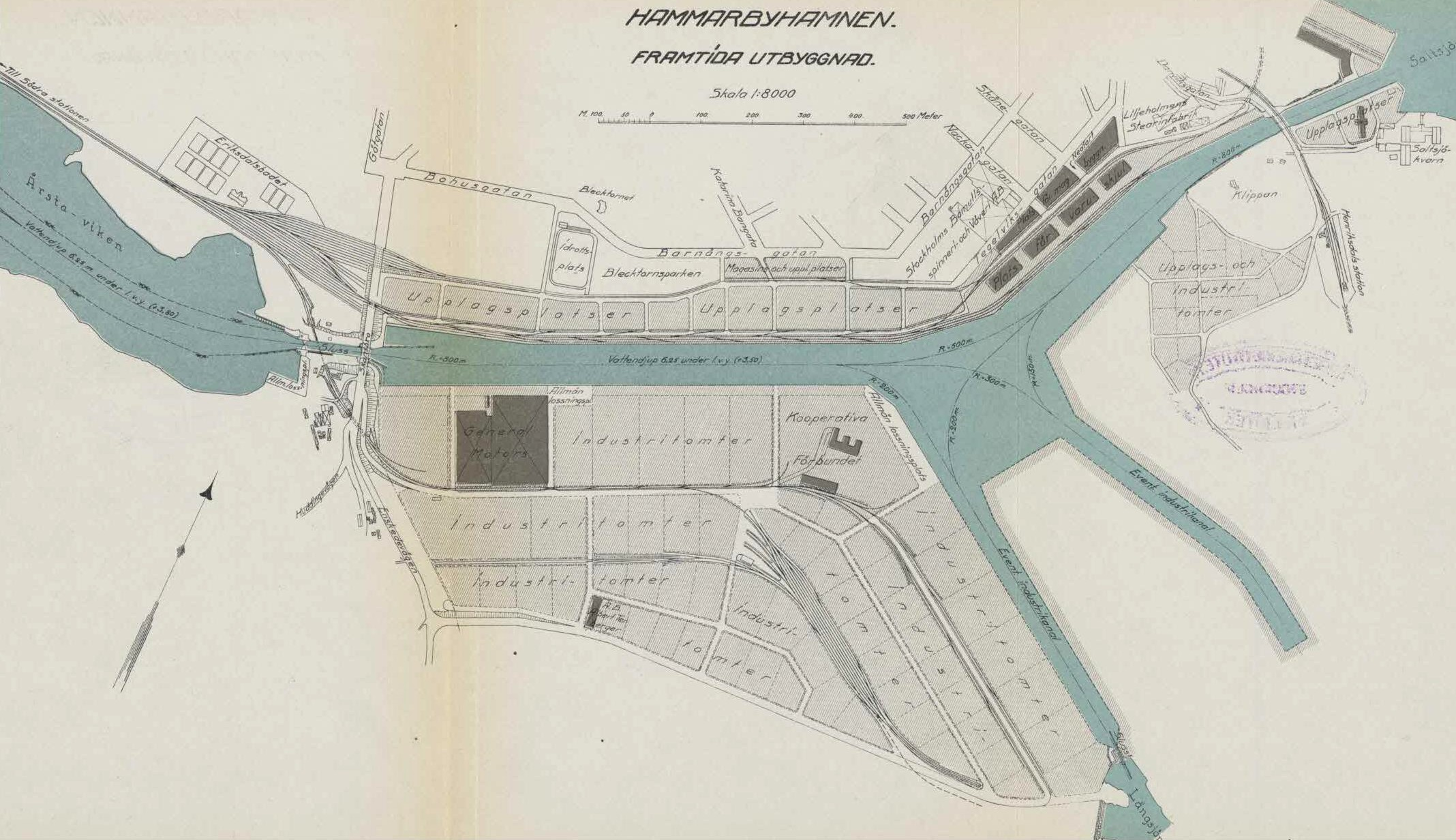
Hammarbyhamnen, planning 1929

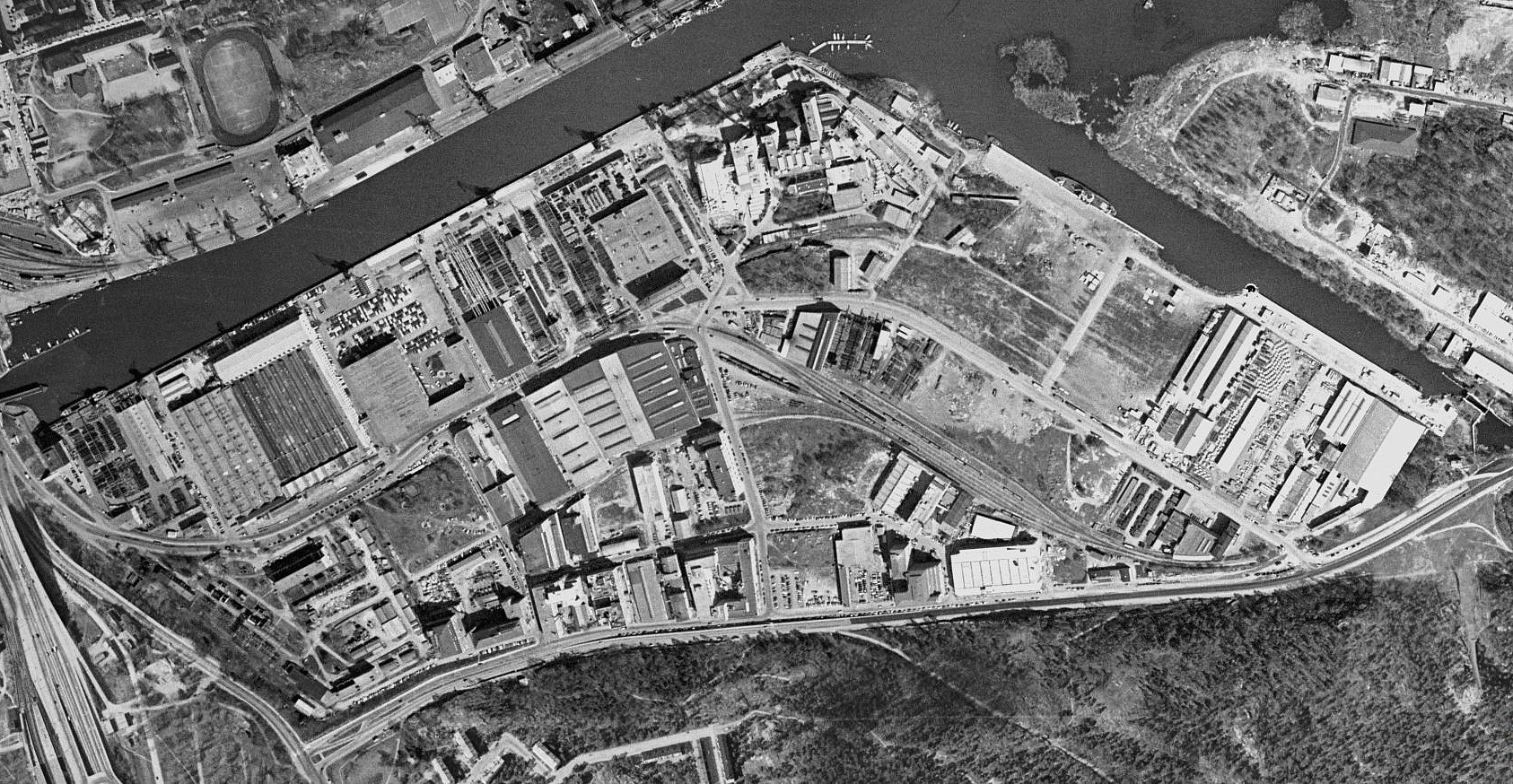
Aerial photo from the 1960s

== Housing ==
Planning for the redevelopment of Södra Hammarbyhamnen began in the late 1980s and developed further during the 1990s as part of the wider Hammarby Sjöstad urban development project. In 1996, Stockholm Municipality adopted an environmental programme for the development, which became known as the Hammarby Model (Hammarbymodellen). The programme aimed to integrate energy, water, wastewater and waste management systems to reduce the environmental impact of the district. Hammarby Sjöstad was initially proposed as the location for the Olympic Village in Stockholm's bid to host the 2004 Summer Olympics. Although Stockholm was not selected to host the Games, the urban development project continued.

The development includes residential buildings, offices, commercial premises, public spaces and recreational facilities. The wider Hammarby Sjöstad project was planned to accommodate approximately 12,700 residential units and 400,000 square metres of commercial space, including approximately 150,000 square metres of office space. The development has taken place in several stages since construction began in 1994. Infrastructure improvements have included the expansion of the Tvärbanan light rail system, road connections and pedestrian routes. The area is also connected to surrounding districts through bridges, waterfront promenades and public transport. The redevelopment of Södra Hammarbyhamnen forms part of the broader transformation of Hammarby Sjöstad from an industrial and harbour area into a mixed-use urban district.

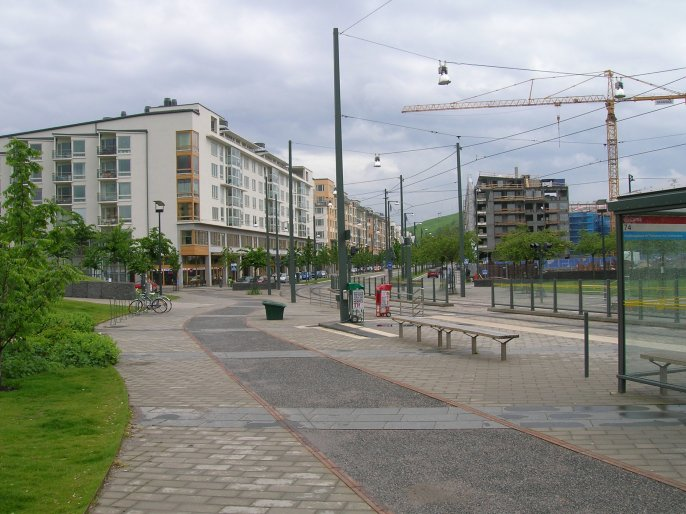
Hammarby allé at Luma in 2005

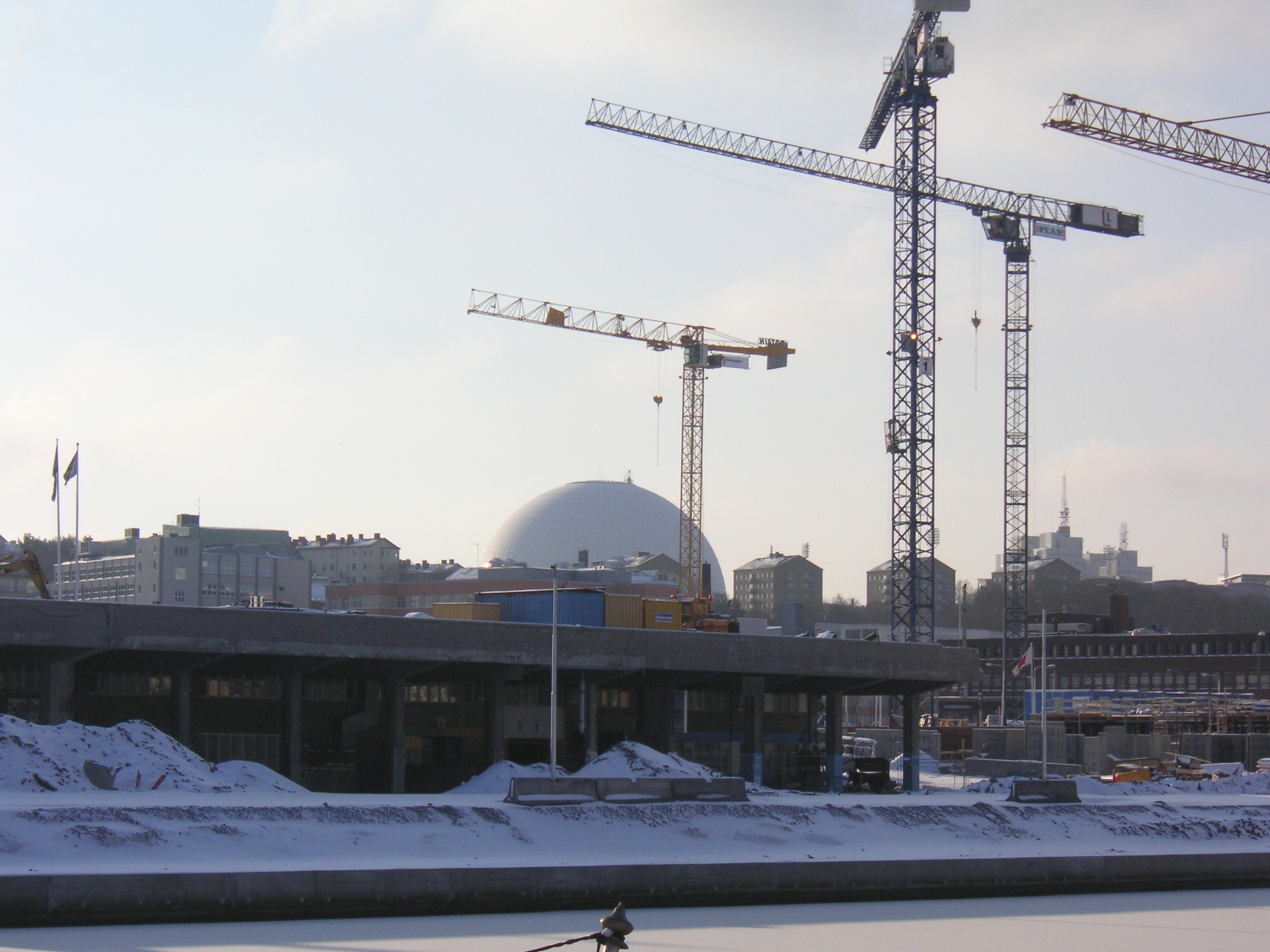
Construction in 2006

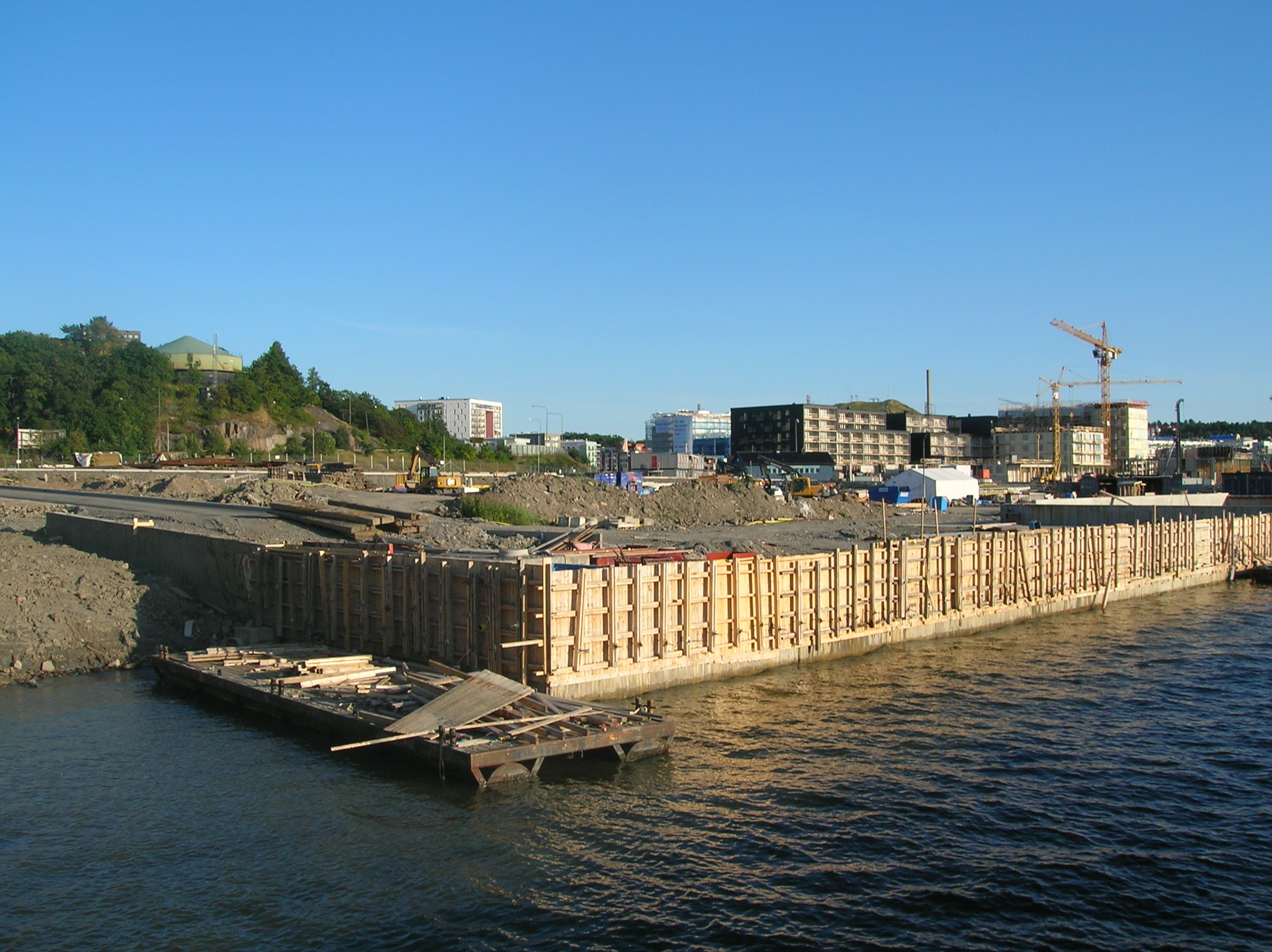
"Per Ludvig Lindgrens terrass" in 2009

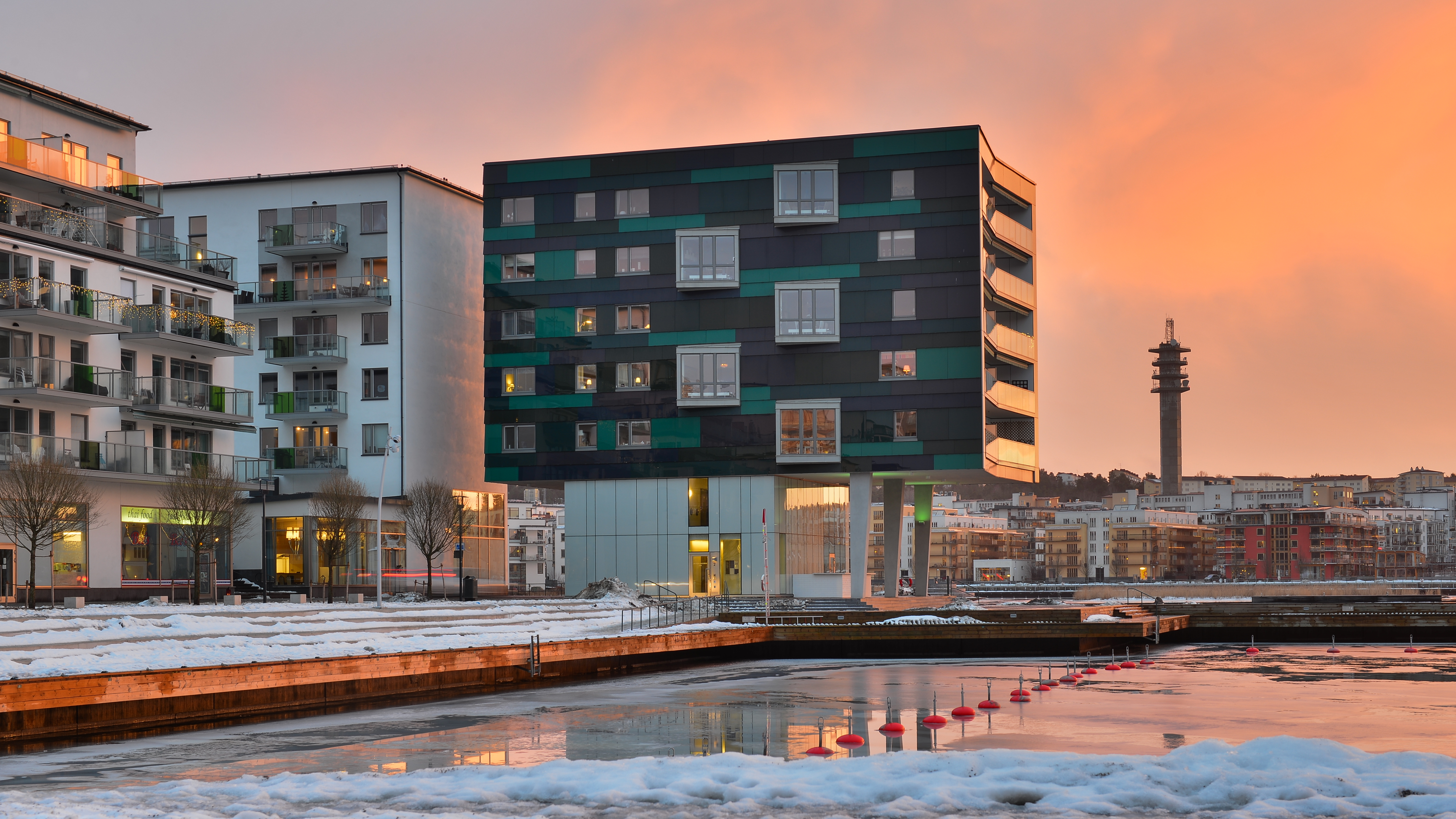
Jan Inghes torg in 2012

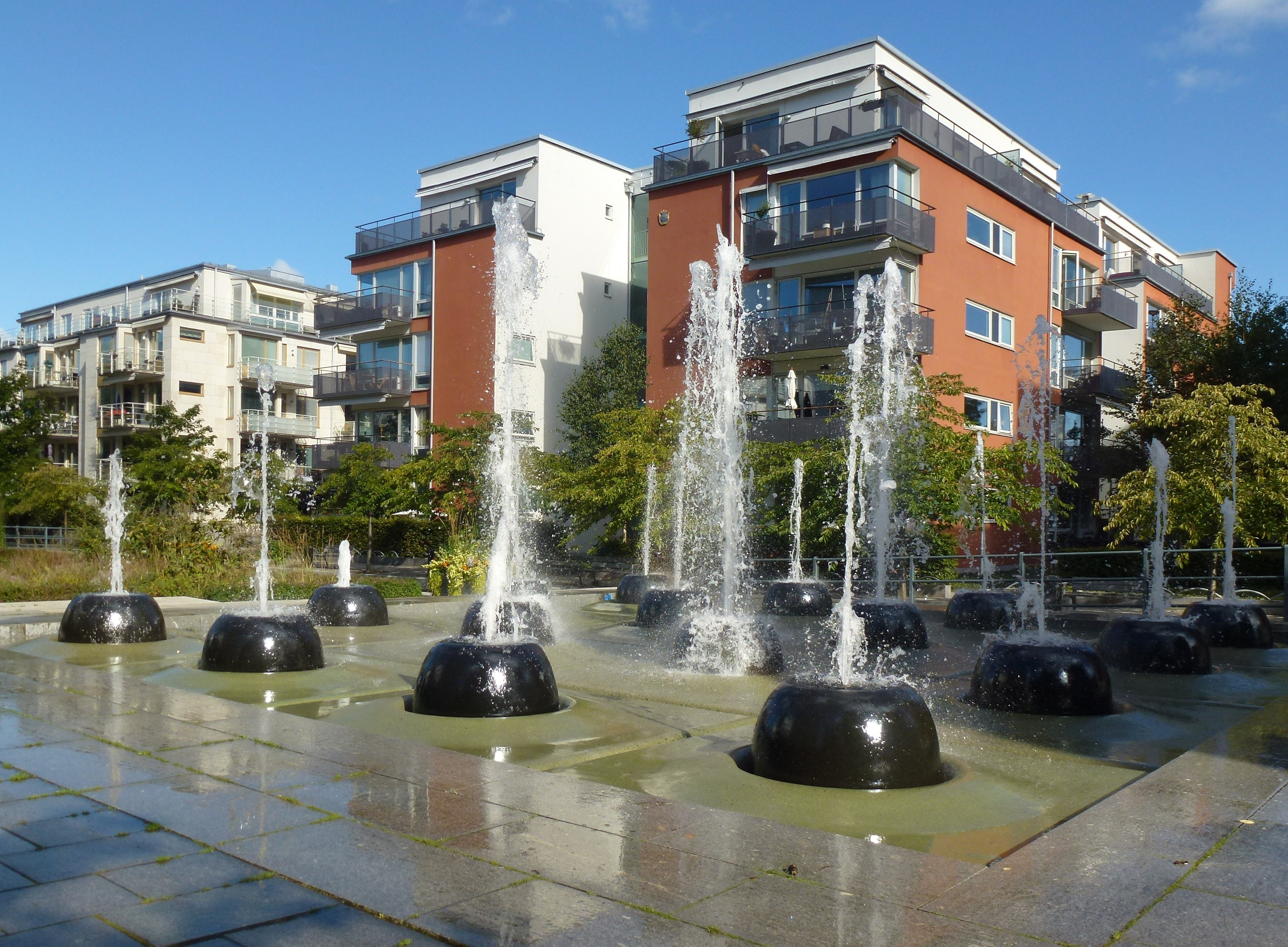
The fountain Fält at Sjöstadsparterren in 2012

== See also ==
The following articles describe various aspects of Södra Hammarbyhamnen and its surrounding area.

- Danviksbro
- Hammarbyhamnen
- Hammarbyleden
- Hammarby Sjö
- Hammarby Sjöstad
- Norra Hammarbyhamnen
