= Hammarby =

Hammarby may refer to:

- Hammarby, Gävleborg, locality in Sandviken Municipality, Gävleborg County, Sweden
- Hammarby, Stockholm, part of southern Stockholm, Sweden
- Hammarby IF, Swedish sports club based in Stockholm, Sweden
- Hammarby Sjö, watercourse in Stockholm, Sweden
- Hammarby Sjöstad, part of Stockholm Municipality, Sweden
- Linnaeus' Hammarby, a botanical garden in Uppsala Municipality, belonging to Uppsala University in Sweden, the former summer home of Carolus Linnaeus

== See also ==
- Hammarbya. a genus of orchid
