= Murder of Anders Gustafsson =

1995 murder in Stockholm, Sweden

- The location where Gustafsson was found.
- Location: 59°18′34″N 18°05′57″E; Norra Hammarbyhamnen, Stockholm, Sweden
- Date: 1 January 1995; 31 years ago 00:30–12:00 a.m. (Note: One source states 00:30–05:00, while another states 00:30–06:00. The police specify the time of the crime as "shortly after midnight on New Year's Eve until lunchtime on New Year's Day (i.e. 1 January 1995)." Gustafsson's body was discovered at approximately 11:45 a.m.) (UTC+01:00)
- Weapons: Blunt and edged weapon
- Deaths: 1
- Victim: 1
- Perpetrators: Unknown, possibly immigrants or white power skinheads
- Motive: Anti-Nazism/Intra-Nazi Conflict (Note: Two possible motives were considered: an anti-Nazi motive, in which the victim was targeted by anti-Nazis who symbolically wanted to cut off the hand used to perform the Nazi salute, or an intra-Nazi motive, in which fellow Nazis killed him because they considered him a fake or disloyal Nazi. Criminologist Leif G. W. Persson expressed a preference for the latter theory, while emphasizing that neither explanation was necessarily correct.)
- Coroner: Olle Lindquist

The Murder of Anders Gustafsson (Swedish: Fryshusmordet, lit. 'The Fryshus murder') was an unsolved murder committed in Stockholm, Sweden, on 1 January 1995. Gustafsson, a 16-year-old from Solna, disappeared during a New Year's Eve celebration at the Fryshuset youth centre in Stockholm. His body was discovered later that morning by a construction worker in a partially demolished warehouse in Norra Hammarbyhamnen, approximately 300 metres from the venue. He had sustained extensive injuries caused by blunt force trauma, and his right hand had been severed at the wrist. The hand was never recovered.

Gustafsson had previously been associated with a group of skinheads who frequented Fryshuset, although he had begun distancing himself from the group during 1994. The circumstances of his murder led investigators to examine possible connections to conflicts between skinhead groups and their opponents in Stockholm. Several theories were considered regarding the motive for the killing and the removal of his hand, including the possibility that it was connected to political or ideological tensions. Investigators also examined whether the hand had been removed to conceal forensic evidence or retained as a trophy.

The police investigation involved numerous interviews, several suspects and repeated examinations of potential links to other violent crimes. Over the following years, investigators pursued different lines of inquiry, including possible involvement by individuals from Gustafsson's social circles and people associated with the skinhead movement. The case received renewed attention through television programmes and subsequent reviews by the Stockholm police cold case unit. New forensic examinations were also conducted on evidence recovered during the original investigation.

In 2018, a construction worker reportedly discovered a bag containing what appeared to be a severed human hand during demolition work at the former Söderdepån premises on Södermalm. As Gustafsson's missing hand had never been found, police considered whether the discovery could be connected to the murder. However, the hand was not recovered despite searches of the building.

Despite several investigative developments and renewed efforts over the decades, no one has been brought to trial for Gustafsson's murder. The case remains unsolved.

== Background ==
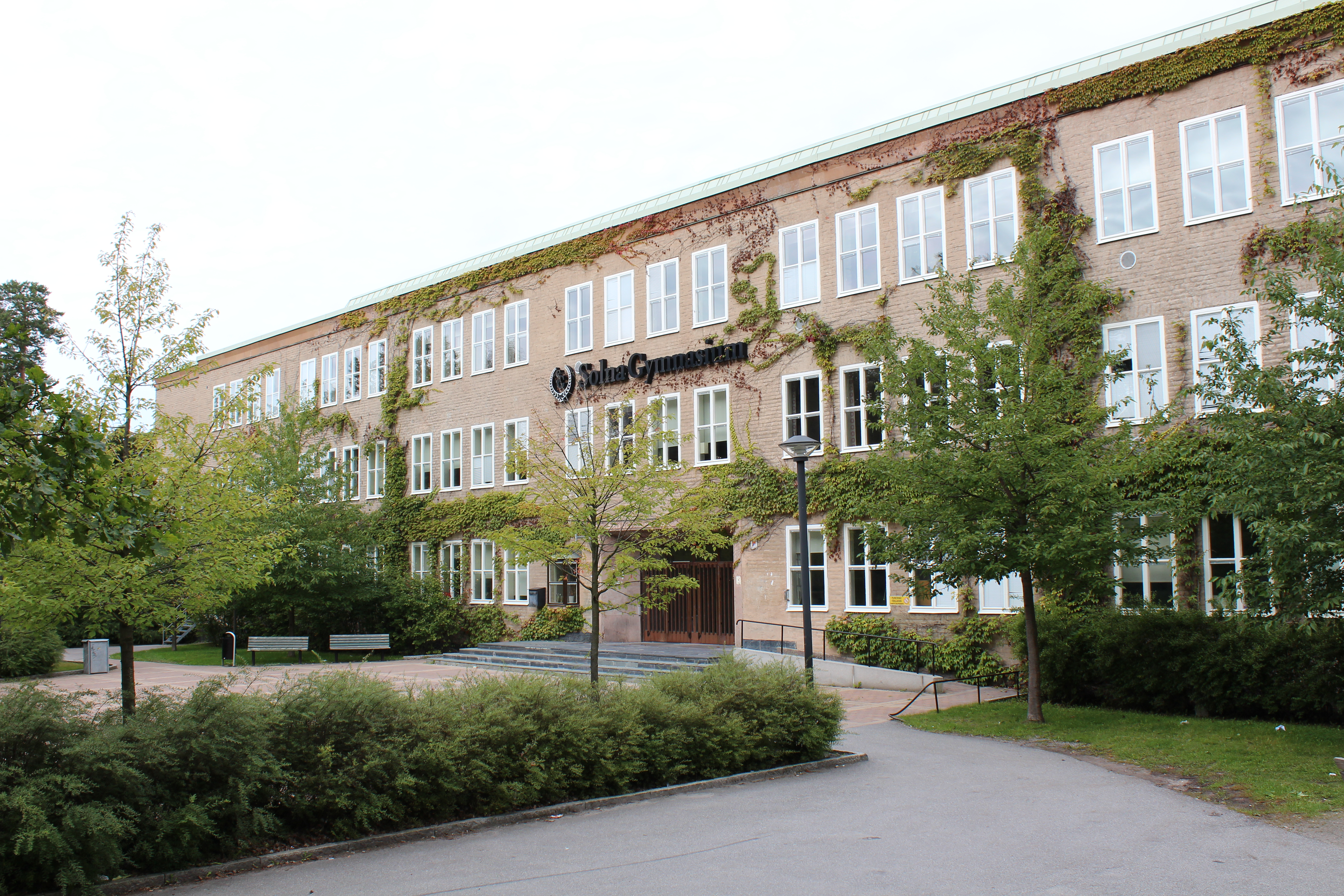
Gustafsson attended Vasalundsgymnasiet in Solna

Anders Gustafsson, the only child of Lilian Gustafsson, was born on 9 July 1978 and grew up in Solna, north of Stockholm. He attended Vasalundsgymnasiet, where he was in his second year of the social sciences programme.

Gustafsson had a strong interest in music from an early age, particularly hard rock. He began playing piano at the age of eight and later learned to play the trombone. He and his mother shared an interest in music and played together in an orchestra. He eventually sold his trombone and bought a mint-green Fender electric guitar, which he played daily. He taught himself to play guitar by listening to musicians such as Yngwie Malmsteen and other guitar virtuosos. According to his mother, Gustafsson was thoughtful, reliable and had a good sense of humour. Lilian described him as a gentle boy who was popular with girls, neither particularly athletic nor especially masculine.

During the autumn of 1993, Gustafsson briefly associated with a group of skinheads who frequented Höder Dart, a skinhead meeting place at the Fryshuset youth centre in Stockholm. His mother believed that his interest was primarily connected to music and a desire to belong to a social group rather than political ideology. Gustafsson himself reportedly told her not to judge all skinheads by what she heard about them. In February or March 1994, he began distancing himself from the group. One of his friends had been forcibly shaved at the premises, an incident that contributed to Gustafsson's decision to stop attending. He allowed his hair to grow and told his mother that the environment had become too disorderly for him.

== Disappearance ==
On 31 December 1994, Gustafsson left his home in Solna to celebrate New Year's Eve with friends. The group initially met at Solna centrum before travelling to Täby and then to Åkersberga, where they attended a preparty. They subsequently decided to leave because the gathering was too disorderly. The group took the train to Stockholms östra railway station and at 10 pm they continued by bus to Fryshuset in Norra Hammarbyhamnen where a New Year's Eve party was being held at Höder Dart. Gustafsson had reportedly been promised an opportunity to make a demo recording and wanted to discuss the possibility with a person associated with the venue who had access to a recording studio. This was the main reason he had agreed to return to a place he had largely avoided for almost a year.

The group arrived approximately 15–20 minutes before midnight. Around 50 people attended the gathering, where Oi! music, a development of punk music, was played. All in all, there were about 180 people at the party on the evening of the murder. According to accounts later given to the police, approximately 10–12 friends had initially travelled together, while the total number of people at the venue increased during the evening.

Gustafsson had consumed approximately two bottles of beer during the evening. Shortly after midnight, at approximately 12:25–12:30 a.m. on 1 January 1995, he telephoned his mother to wish her a happy New Year. He had taken the telephone number with him, written on a piece of paper in his pocket, for the friends his mother was visiting. Lilian Gustafsson was celebrating with friends on Färingsö, outside Stockholm. It was the last time Lilian heard from Anders.

During the conversation, Anders told his mother that the premises had been renovated and looked much better. She suggested that he come home and sleep rather than stay overnight with a friend. He reportedly reassured her that he would leave if he felt threatened in any way. It was the last time she heard from him.

At approximately 1:30 a.m., Gustafsson's friends decided to leave. They noticed that he was no longer with them and initially assumed that he might already have gone home. Some accounts state that approximately 15 of his friends subsequently searched the surrounding area, but they were unable to find him. They eventually left without him. Gustafsson's disappearance was later estimated to have occurred sometime after midnight.

== Murder ==
On the morning of 1 January 1995, Lilian Gustafsson attempted to contact her son at their home in Solna. When he did not answer, she returned home and discovered that the apartment was empty. After contacting one of his friends, she learned that the group had lost track of Anders during the night. Together with two of his friends, she began searching for him, initially travelling to Täby and subsequently to Norra Hammarbyhamnen, then a desolate and undeveloped part of Stockholm.

At approximately 11:45 a.m. on 1 January 1995, a construction worker discovered Gustafsson's body in an open, partially demolished warehouse at Quayside 314 (Note: According to the police, the murder took place at Quayside (Kajplats) 314, which was later renumbered as Quayside 311. An October 2018 article in the newspaper Expressen refers to Quayside 312. According to Google Street View, Quaysides 312 and 313 are located in the same place.) in Norra Hammarbyhamnen, on Södermalm in Stockholm. The body lay completely open in the partially demolished warehouse, in a building that lacked walls. The building had previously been used as a salt warehouse and was being demolished. The location was approximately 300 metres from Fryshuset. The police initially considered the possibility that Gustafsson had been run over, but it soon became apparent that he had been murdered. His body showed extensive injuries caused by severe blunt force trauma to the head and other parts of his body. His right hand had been severed at the wrist and was missing. The hand was never recovered.

The police had cordoned off the area around the warehouse. When Lilian Gustafsson and her companions reached the police cordon, she informed an officer that she was looking for her missing son. She was initially told that a dead man had been found nearby, but did not believe that the victim could be Anders. One of his friends subsequently provided the police with a description of the clothes Gustafsson had been wearing: new jeans and a tartan shirt. After several minutes, the police informed Lilian that the deceased person was almost certainly her son.

A post-mortem examination was conducted on 3 January 1995. According to forensic examinations, Gustafsson had been attacked with considerable force. Injuries to his knuckles indicated that he had attempted to defend himself and had struck his attacker several times. Investigators believed that the perpetrator might have sustained injuries to the face during the struggle. The estimated time of death was between approximately 12:30 a.m. and 6:00 a.m. on 1 January 1995.

== Investigation ==
=== Initial investigation ===
The Stockholm police launched an extensive investigation. By 19 January 1995, the violent crime division had questioned approximately 80 people. Initially, investigators considered whether the murder might have been connected to conflicts between skinhead groups and groups of young men with immigrant backgrounds. During this period, several violent confrontations between these groups had taken place in Stockholm. The police believed the conflict began as early as the spring of 1994, with a stabbing incident at the Tekniska högskolan metro station in Stockholm. On that occasion, four skinheads were stabbed, and the conflict subsequently continued with repeated assaults whenever skinheads appeared.

On 10 January 1995, it was reported that Stockholm police had asked police in Oskarshamn for information about the February 1990 murder of 81-year-old Ebba Karlsson in Mönsterås. The investigators noted similarities to the murder of Anders Gustafsson: both victims had suffered severe injuries, including the unexplained amputation of one hand. Karlsson had sustained more than 200 documented injuries. Her killers were a 17-year-old boy and a 25-year-old woman, who were convicted of murder and aggravated robbery, respectively. The boy received a five-year prison sentence. The victim's severed hand was buried outside the apartment where the perpetrators lived and was later located with the help of a police dog. After serving his sentence, the young man, who was of Yugoslav origin but born in Sweden, moved to a town near Stockholm.

On 4 February 1995, reports indicated that the police were investigating possible connections between Gustafsson's murder, the disappearance of a 25-year-old skinhead associated with Fryshuset, and a separate attack in which a 22-year-old skinhead had been seriously injured in a stabbing near Mariatorget a few days before 30 November (Note: On 30 November 1718, King Charles XII of Sweden died. In the late 20th century, Swedish nationalists and neo-Nazis used 30 November as a date for their ceremonies. These ceremonies were regularly disrupted by larger counter-demonstrations and were eventually abandoned.) 1994. The latter incident had occurred following an attack on four skinheads who had been forced off a Stockholm Metro train. Police inspector Jan Winner and criminal commissioner Bo Wide were among the officers involved in examining possible connections between the incidents.

One theory was that Gustafsson's right hand had been severed as a symbolic act connected to the Nazi salute, which involved raising the right arm. Some investigators considered the possibility that the murder had been committed by opponents of the skinhead movement as an act of revenge. Others suggested that the mutilation might have been intended as a punishment for refusing to perform the salute. Cutting off one hand was something the Nazis did during World War II to those who refused to perform the Nazi salute.

The forensic pathologist Olle Lindquist proposed two possible explanations for why the perpetrator had taken the hand. It might have been kept as a trophy or as a personal object, serving as a reminder or fetish associated with the murder. Investigators also examined whether the removal of the hand might have been intended to conceal evidence, such as the perpetrator's DNA.

=== Early suspects ===
In February 1995, the police focused on a 17-year-old acquaintance of Gustafsson who had attended the New Year's Eve party. The two teenagers knew each other and had reportedly spoken during the evening. Witnesses also stated that 17-year-old had been seen alone with Gustafsson during the night. One possible motive considered by investigators was jealousy. The two teenagers were reportedly interested in the same girl. However, friends of the suspects disputed that there had been any conflict between them. The man was detained and prosecutor Jan Danielsson requested that he be remanded in custody on suspicion of murder. He denied involvement. He was subsequently released because the evidence was insufficient.

In March 1995, reports also drew attention to the murder of Roland Björkman, a 21-year-old from Vårby whose body was found in a gravel pit outside Mullsjö. Björkman had been shot during the night of 20–21 January 1995, and both of his hands had been severed. The similarities between the cases attracted attention, although no established connection between the murders was demonstrated. On 22 July 1998, Matija Sovdat, who was under investigation in connection with several murders, was undergoing a forensic psychiatric examination when police announced that they were examining possible links between him and a number of unsolved or investigated cases, including the murder of Anders Gustafsson.

Another individual who later attracted attention was the skinhead Roager Rafael "Stonebreaker" Rush (1977–1999). Rush had allegedly told acquaintances that he had killed Gustafsson. He was a friend of the first individual suspected in the murder and, like Gustafsson, frequently visited the Fryshuset youth centre in Stockholm. According to detective chief inspector Bo Wide, who led the murder investigation, Rush had been questioned but was never formally suspected of Gustafsson's murder. Information about his alleged confession had been passed to the Swedish Security Service (Säpo), as reported in December 1999.

On 26 March 1995, a few months after the murder of Gustafsson, Rush severely assaulted Aftonbladet employee Christer Dyrwoold, kicking him repeatedly in the head and jumping on his head after he had fallen to the ground. Rush was later convicted of attempted murder and sentenced to three years in prison. After his release, he continued associating with skinheads and Nazi groups and reportedly worked as a guard outside several Stockholm shops selling Nazi material. In September 1999, Rush travelled to Finland, where he was murdered on 23 September in an apartment in Vantaa, north of Helsinki, together with two Finnish skinheads. The killings were carried out by Veli Matti Huohvanainen. Finnish police suspected that the murders were connected to a conflict between rival groups.

=== Later investigative developments ===
In March 2004, new information led investigators to examine a theory that Gustafsson had been murdered by a group of young men with immigrant backgrounds. According to this theory, the perpetrators had attacked him because of his association with skinheads and subsequently severed his hand to desecrate his body. Police received the name of a person suspected of involvement, but the theory was not established.

On 21 March 2006, police arrested a 41-year-old man from Nacka on reasonable suspicion of murder. He had previously been included in the investigation and was known to have moved in circles that had celebrated New Year's Eve in Norra Hammarbyhamnen. The arrest followed renewed public attention to the case after it was featured in the television programme Cold Case Sverige. The programme's production team, led by executive producer Nicke Johansson, had examined two parties in Hammarbyhamnen on the night of the murder, including one at a pizzeria and another at a motorcycle club. The 41-year-old denied any involvement. He was released without being remanded in custody because the level of suspicion was insufficient.

On 11 April 2006, two 39-year-old men were arrested on suspicion of murder. They were reportedly childhood friends of the 41-year-old man and had grown up in the same area of Nacka. Both denied involvement and were released on 12 April. The suspicions against the three men were not entirely dismissed at the time.

In May 2006, police divers searched the waters of Hammarbyhamnen for skeletal remains and objects that might have been connected to the murder. The search followed information obtained during the investigation, but no relevant findings were made. A previous search using a cadaver dog had also failed to produce results. During the same period, investigators continued examining two principal lines of inquiry involving other individuals.

In April 2008, the Stockholm cold case unit reported that previously unexamined traces had been discovered on Gustafsson's clothing. The garments were sent to the National Swedish Laboratory of Forensic Science (SKL) in Linköping for further examination. Investigators hoped to obtain a DNA profile that could be compared with approximately 45,000 profiles in the laboratory's database of convicted offenders and crime suspects.

In October 2008, detective inspector (kriminalinspektör) Eiler Augustsson criticised the handling of the original investigation, stating that the case had not been properly managed from the beginning and had been transferred between several police officers.

In May 2010, Augustsson stated that investigators had identified a small group of four or five people whom they wanted to question. He believed that the perpetrators belonged to the same social circles as those present at Fryshuset on the night of the murder, rather than being outsiders opposed to the skinhead movement. Investigators were awaiting results from new DNA analyses conducted at another laboratory.

In July 2011, Aftonbladet reported that criminologist Leif G. W. Persson, criminologist Mikael Rying and legal expert Eva Sjögren were working at the Swedish National Police Board on a review of unsolved murders committed since 1 July 1985. Persson discussed two possible explanations for the mutilation of Gustafsson's hand. One was that anti-Nazi individuals had removed the hand associated with the Nazi salute. The other was that individuals within the Nazi movement had mutilated him because they considered him an insufficiently committed member. Persson stated that he considered the latter theory more plausible, although neither explanation had been established.

=== Renewed examination of suspects ===
When the cold case unit revisited the investigation, attention turned once again to Roager Rush, who had been a suspect in 1995 but was himself murdered in 1999. Investigators discovered that he had not been thoroughly questioned about his activities on the night of the murder. There were reports that he and several others had travelled to a nearby restaurant around midnight, but this information did not appear to have been fully verified.

Rush had previously been convicted of the attempted murder of Christer Dyrwoold and sentenced to three years in prison. He was also known to have a history of serious violence. According to Göran Olsson of the cold case unit, Rush could not be completely ruled out as a suspect, but his death meant that further questioning was impossible.

=== The reported discovery of a hand in 2018 ===
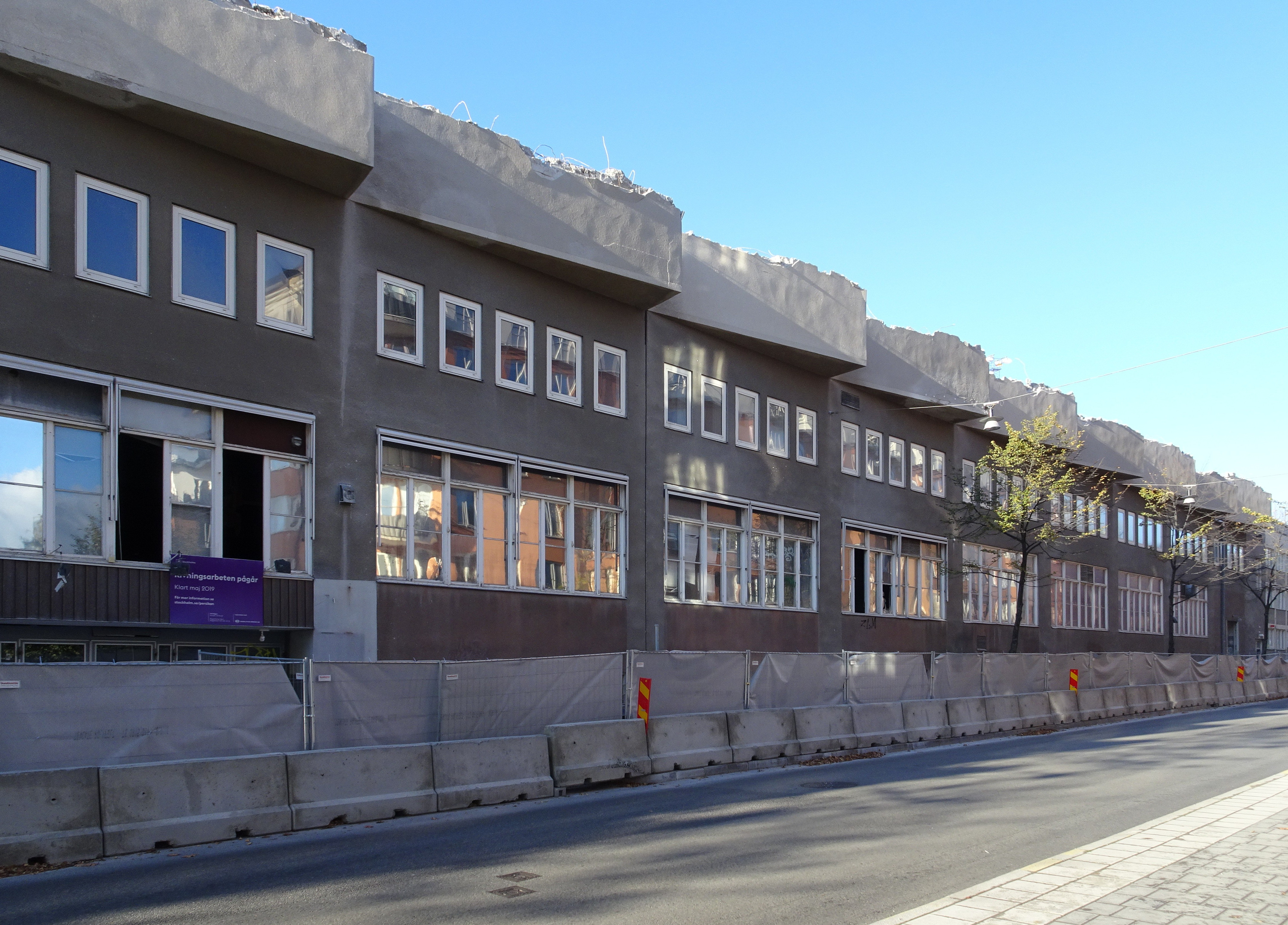
During the demolition of Söderdepån in 2018 (pictured), a construction worker reportedly found a hand.

In the summer of 2018, a foreign construction worker contacted the police after reportedly discovering a severed hand in a building on Södermalm, near the site of Gustafsson's murder. The Söderdepån building was the former premises of the Stockholm Transport Museum in Norra Hammarbyhamnen. The worker was involved in demolition work when he found a bag containing what appeared to be a human hand.

The discovery was considered potentially significant because Gustafsson's right hand had never been found. Police therefore considered whether the remains might belong to him. The worker was reportedly so shocked by the discovery that he dropped the bag among construction debris before contacting the police. Although officers searched the premises with dogs, they were unable to locate it again. The worker could not subsequently remember exactly which room he had found it in.

Mats Pettersson, an investigator with the Stockholm cold case unit, stated that there was no reason to doubt the worker's account and that police intended to conduct a larger search. The former museum premises covered approximately 5,000 square metres and contained numerous rooms, corridors and areas filled with debris. The search was further complicated by the presence of homeless people and animal remains.

By October 2018, the search had been temporarily suspended because of asbestos in the building. Police expected that the operation would take several weeks once it could resume. The hand was not recovered.

== Aftermath ==
Lindhagen's Hill in Norra begravningsplatsen (pictured in 2017), where Gustafsson is buried.

On 7 January 1995, approximately 190 skinheads gathered at Fryshuset to commemorate Gustafsson. The intention was to hold a peaceful procession from the youth centre to the warehouse where he had been found. Several of his friends had contacted newspapers and television stations so that the event could be documented. The gathering was intended as a demonstration against violence. However, the memorial developed into disturbances involving assaults and stone throwing directed at members of the media. An Aftonbladet photographer was threatened outside Fryshuset before the procession began. Other journalists were attacked near the harbour. TV4 photographer Ulf Karlsson narrowly avoided being struck in the head by a large stone, which hit his camera instead. Another piece of concrete reportedly passed close to his head. The violence was attributed to a group of approximately 20 individuals, while the procession itself eventually reached the murder scene.

Gustafsson was buried on 28 February 1995 at Lindhagen's Hill in Norra begravningsplatsen, Solna.

In 1996, his mother, Lilian Gustafsson, founded the non-profit association Ringar på Vattnet (Rings on the Water) together with friends. The organisation aimed to help solve the murder and raise awareness of violence. The association offered a reward of 500,000 Swedish kronor for information that could lead to the identification and conviction of the perpetrator. Lilian also distributed leaflets and spoke at schools, with local police and Victim Support Sweden. The association additionally provided small grants to young people who had shown courage by testifying in violent crime cases.

Over the years, Lilian remained in regular contact with investigators and continued to campaign for the case to be solved. She believed that her son had probably been attacked by someone he trusted. According to her, he would not have gone alone to the abandoned warehouse in Norra Hammarbyhamnen in the middle of the night, an area that at the time was frequented by homeless people and drug users. She also described him as someone who was afraid of the dark.

The association Ringar på Vattnet was dissolved on New Year's Eve 2020. The 500,000 kronor originally intended as a reward was instead distributed among 44 students at Solna Cultural School (Solna kulturskola) and students at Solna Brass, in recognition of Gustafsson's lifelong interest in music.

== Status of the case ==
The murder of Anders Gustafsson remains unsolved. Four people have been detained at different stages of the investigation on suspicion of involvement, but the available evidence has not been sufficient to bring anyone to trial for the murder. The case has been handled by the Stockholm police cold case unit, which has continued to examine evidence and investigate new information.

Police inspector Urban Morin has stated that investigators believe that people who know what happened may still be alive, but that information provided many years after the crime must be supported by forensic evidence or other independently verifiable information. Despite the passage of more than three decades, investigators have not abandoned the case.

== In the media ==
On 19 January 1995, the case was featured on TV3's reality legal program Efterlyst.

On 7 March 2006, the case was featured on TV4's show Cold Case Sverige and again on 6 June 2006.

On 24 April 2010, the case was revisited in an episode of the podcast P1 Dokumentär.

On 14 December 2010, the case was revisited in episode 9 och season 1 in the Sveriges Television's program Veckans brott.

On 4 June 2020, the case was revisited in an episode of the podcast Olösta fall.

On 17 November 2021, the case was revisited in an episode of the podcast Fallen som förföljer.

In November 2024, the case was revisited in an episode of the podcast Aftonbladet Krim.

On 3 September 2026, the case was revisited in an episode of the podcast Svenska mordhistorier.

== See also ==
- Murder of Per Häggström
