= Södertörn =

Peninsula in eastern Södermanland, Sweden

Coordinates: 59.01699°N 17.88637°E

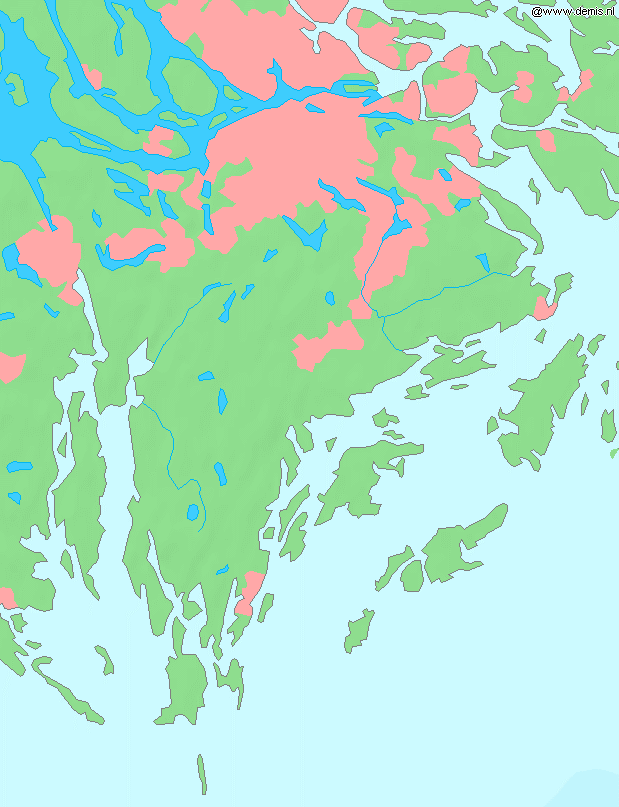
Södertörn

Södertörn is a roughly triangular island in eastern Södermanland, Sweden, with an area of 1,207 km² and is bordered by:

- Lake Mälaren, the Hammarby Canal and the inlet of Saltsjön (a part of the Baltic Sea) to the north,
- The Baltic Sea (the Stockholm Archipelago) to the east and the south,
- Himmerfjärden and Hallsfjärden (parts of the Baltic Sea) to the west as well as
- The Södertälje Canal to the northwest.

The Södertälje Canal and Hammarby Canal are man-made waterways, so the peninsula of Södertörn is not fully separated from (the rest of) the Swedish mainland or the island of Södermalm by nature, although Södertörn is classified as an island by Statistics Sweden, and the third largest island in Sweden.

Since 2005, the whole of Södertörn has been included in Metropolitan Stockholm. Before that, the southern parts of the island, which lie within Nynäshamn Municipality, and the western parts, which are in Södertälje Municipality, were – although in Stockholm County – not included in the metropolitan area.

The northern areas of Södertörn are to a large extent made up of joint valley landscape (and urban areas), where the high ground is either pine forest or bare bedrock. The long valleys of the south become level ground. The waters surrounding the area are either freshwater or brackish water with low salinity. The bedrock is almost entirely gneiss.

The highest point on Södertörn is Tornberget in Haninge at 110.9 metres (363.8 feet) above sea level. It is located in Hanveden, a large area of largely coniferous forest south of Stockholm, whose eastern areas partially form the Tyresta National Park.

The southernmost parts of Södertörn were connected to Stockholm in 1901, when the Nynäs Line was opened. The railway runs between Nynäshamn in the south and Älvsjö in the north, where it joins with the main southern railway.

== Etymology ==
Its name (á [...] Taurinum in 1225, Tør in 1283, a Tørinne in 1383 and eventually ‘‘Södertörn’’ since 1645) derives from the Old Norse dialect word tor, meaning "broken rocky beaches", which cut deep into the coast of Södertörn.

== Municipalities of Södertörn ==
- Botkyrka
- Haninge
- Huddinge
- Nacka (west of Skurusundet)
- Nynäshamn
- Salem
- Stockholm (the Söderort, southern, part)
- Södertälje (east of the Södertälje Canal)
- Tyresö

These municipalities are located both in Stockholm County and the province of Södermanland.

== See also ==
- Södertörn University
