= Norra Hammarbyhamnen =

Residential and harbor area in Stockholm, Sweden

Coordinates: 59°18′16.76″N 18°4′54.56″E

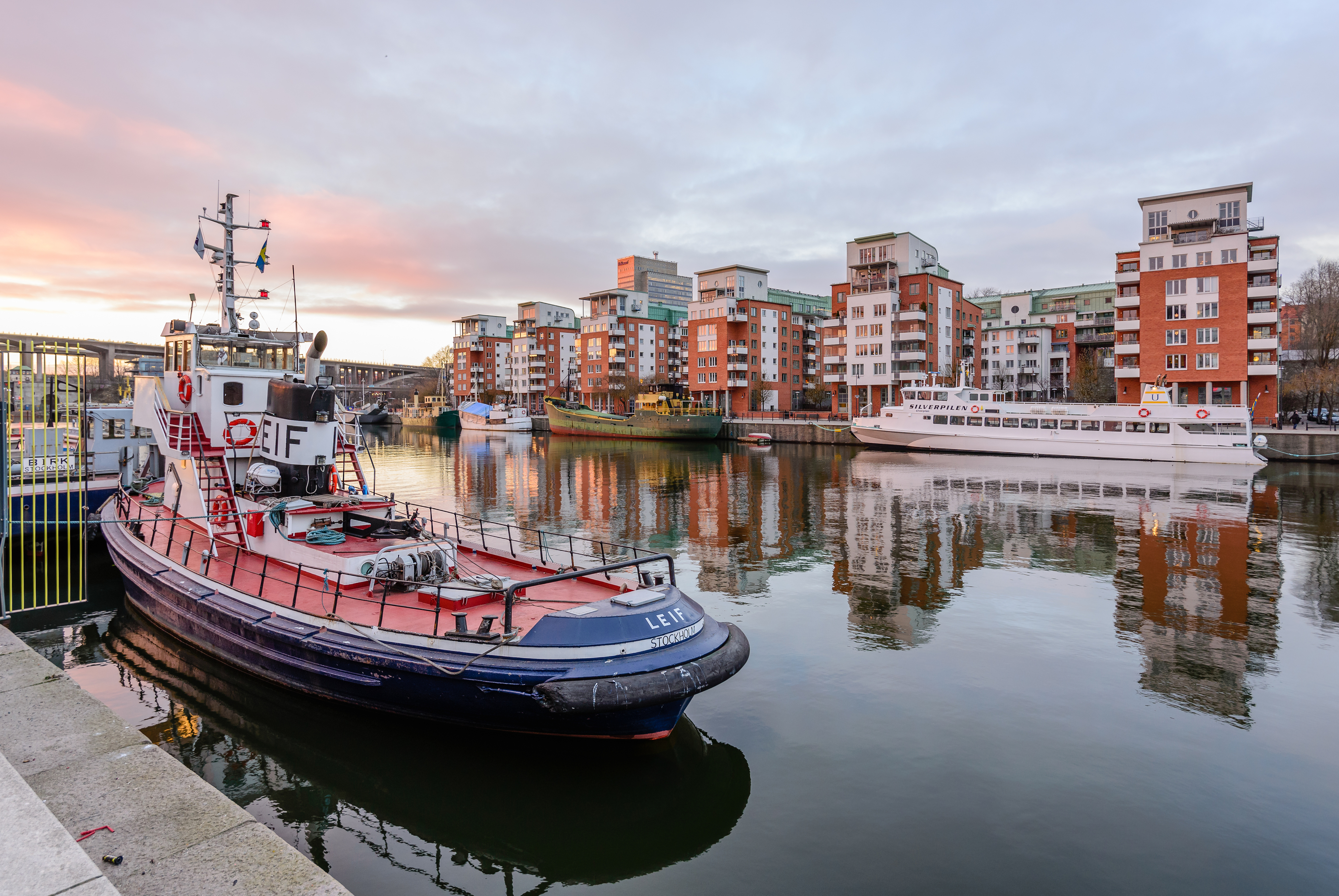
Norra Hammarbyhamnen in 2015

Norra Hammarbyhamnen (lit. 'Northern Hammarby Harbor') is a waterfront area located on the eastern part of Södermalm in Stockholm, Sweden. Extending approximately 1.9 kilometres along Hammarbyleden, the quay is used primarily as a pedestrian and cycling route and serves as a recreational area for residents and visitors. It is situated near the districts of Hammarby Sjöstad, Skanstull and Gullmarsplan. The area forms part of Stockholm's historic waterfront and reflects the city's former use of its quays for shipping, goods transportation and railway infrastructure. Today, Norra Hammarbyhamnen functions primarily as a public recreational space.

== History ==
=== Establishment of the harbour ===
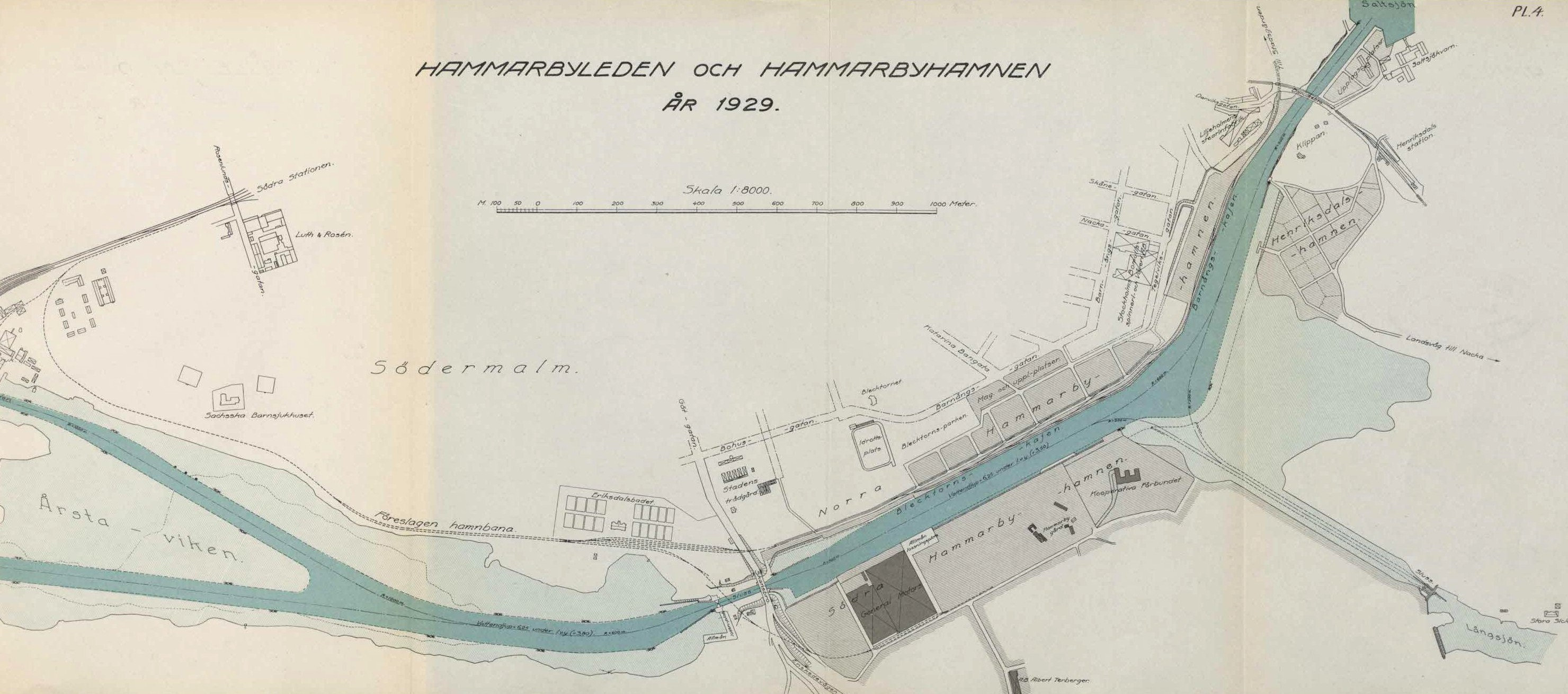
Hammarbyleden and Hammarbyhamnen in their completed state in 1929. Hammarbyhamnen's harbor railway is also visible here.

The area underwent major changes during the 1920s as part of the construction of the Hammarbyleden waterway, which connected Hammarby Lake to the Baltic Sea (Saltsjön). The route was created partly through the excavation of the Danvik Canal using blasting. During the construction period, Hammarby Lake was drained and a large lock was built at Skanstull.

When Hammarbyleden was inaugurated in 1929, the water level of Hammarby Lake had been lowered by several metres, substantially altering its shoreline and creating new land suitable for development. Harbour and industrial facilities were established along the newly constructed quays on both the northern and southern shores of the lake. Norra Hammarbyhamnen consisted primarily of two sections: Barnängskajen, which served as a general cargo and storage harbour, and Blecktornskajen, which was used for the storage of bulk materials, including coal, coke and salt. The harbour never developed into a major industrial port. The gradual closure of harbour operations began as early as the 1960s.

=== Residential redevelopment ===
The development of Hammarby Harbour meant that the dense grid plan proposed in Albert Lindhagen's 1866 general plan for Stockholm was never extended all the way to the waterfront of Hammarby Lake. When plans for residential development in the area were revived in the early 1960s, urban planning ideals had changed considerably. In 1968, the city's General Planning Committee presented Söder 67, a comprehensive planning programme for Södermalm. It included a new development plan for Norra Hammarbyhamnen, proposing open slab-block housing arranged in alignment with Katarina Bangata. The housing cooperative organisation HSB also presented an alternative proposal consisting of fan-shaped terraced buildings designed to provide views of the water.

The planning process was prolonged, and a new detailed development plan for the area was not seriously pursued until the late 1970s. The detailed plan for the Hamnvakten city block, approved by Stockholm City Council in 1978, abandoned the earlier proposal for open slab-block housing in favour of irregular perimeter blocks with large enclosed courtyards. The new urban layout drew clear inspiration from architect Per Olof Hallman's 1920s plan for the neighbouring Blecktorn area. The development was designed by HSB's architectural office, with György Korodi as architect. Stockholm's City Planning Office and architect Alexander Wolodarski also played influential roles in shaping the urban layout.

=== Relationship with Hammarby Sjöstad ===
During the late 1980s, the conditions for development around Hammarby Canal changed once again. All harbour operations ceased, and planning began for the large-scale urban redevelopment project known as Hammarby Sjöstad. The new vision placed greater emphasis on the waterfront as both a visual focal point and a public promenade. The inward-facing perimeter blocks and enclosed courtyards of Hamnvakten contrasted with this waterfront-oriented planning approach. As a result, the Hamnvakten development was never fully regarded as part of Hammarby Sjöstad.

=== Surviving traces of the harbour ===
Very little of the original harbour environment remains. The relatively simple industrial buildings that once occupied the site were not considered worthy of preservation when plans for the new residential development were prepared. The most clearly identifiable surviving features from the harbour era are the original quay and a railway track formerly used for freight transport. Nearby, Orion Theatre occupies a former mechanical workshop and is one of the few remaining buildings associated with the area's industrial and maritime past.

== Geography and characteristics ==
The quay is approximately 1.9 kilometres long and occupies a southerly position along Hammarbyleden. Its location provides extensive exposure to sunlight throughout much of the day, making it a popular area for outdoor recreation. The surrounding urban environment includes residential neighbourhoods and public spaces. Its proximity to Hammarby Sjöstad, Skanstull and Gullmarsplan makes it accessible to a large number of residents and visitors. Despite its recreational popularity, much of the quay retains characteristics of its former transport-oriented design. Its layout includes clearly separated pedestrian and cycling routes, with a handrail dividing parts of the walking area from the adjacent cycle path.

Norra Hammarbyhamnen was historically designed to accommodate maritime activities and goods transportation. Its physical layout reflects its former industrial and transport-related functions, including areas previously used for railway traffic.

== Panoramic image ==
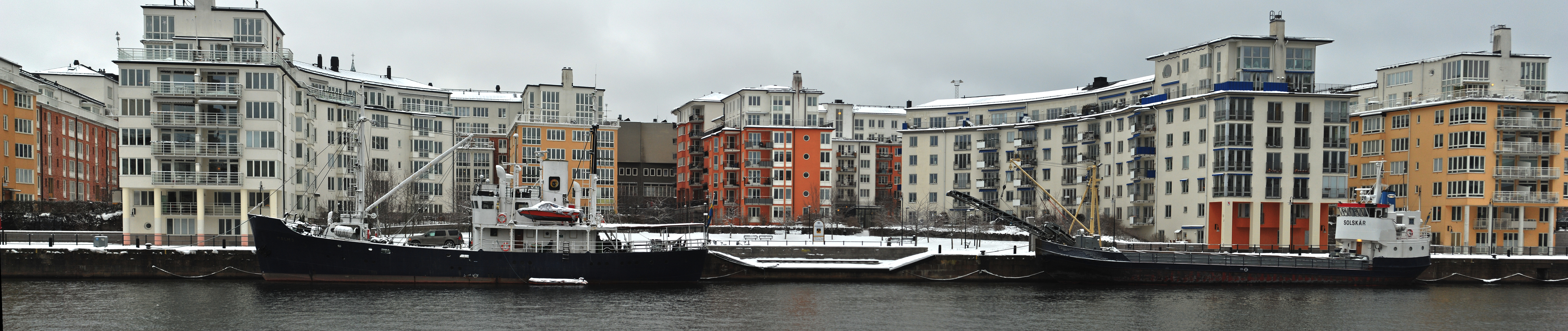
The buildings around Mandel Park, viewed from Henriksdalshamnen. On the left is the heritage-listed vessel MS Malmö.

== See also ==
- Hammarbyhamnen
- Södra Hammarbyhamnen
