= Danviksbro =

Bascule bridge in central Stockholm, Sweden

Coordinates: 59°18′49″N 18°06′17″E

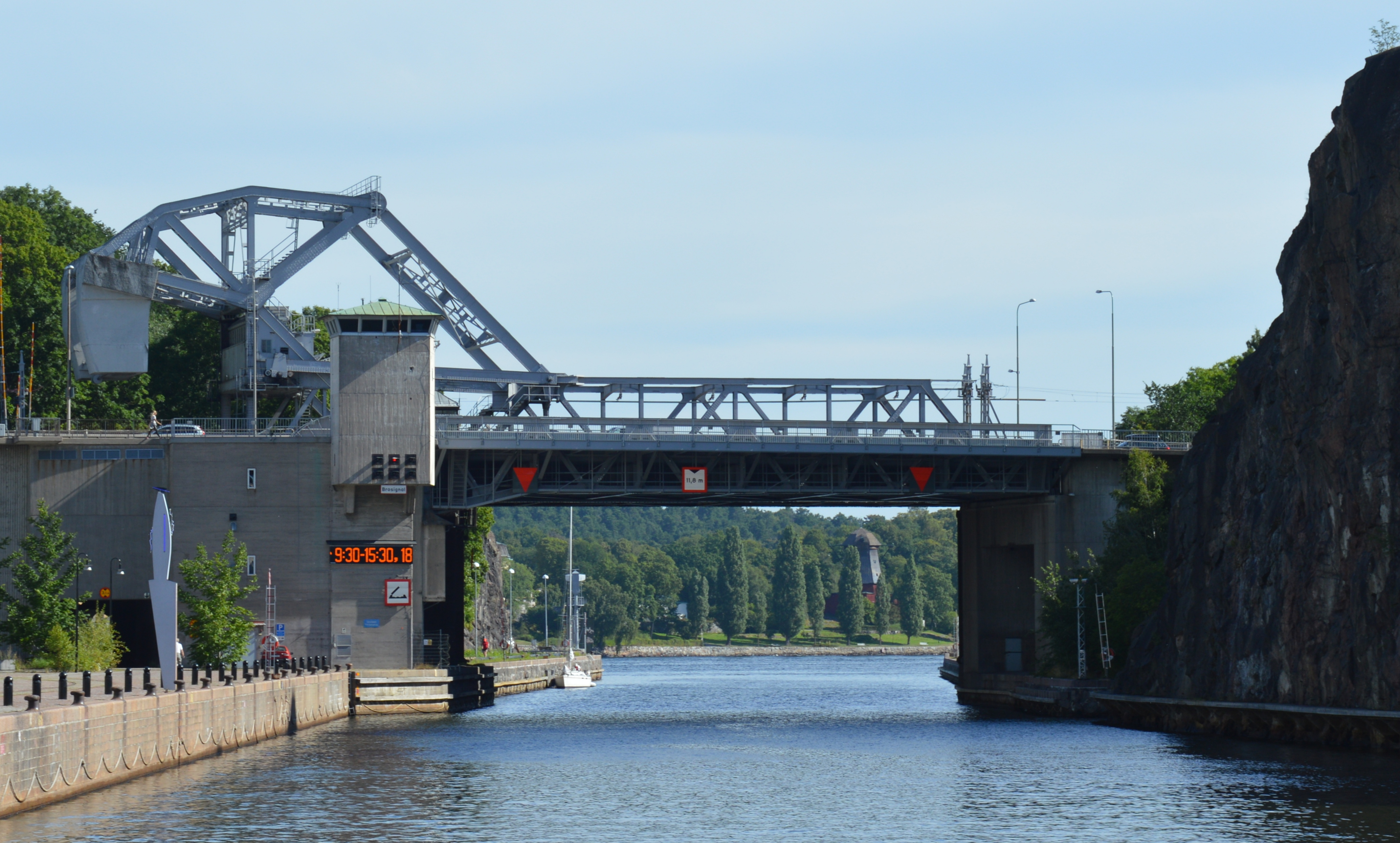
Danviksbro in 2015

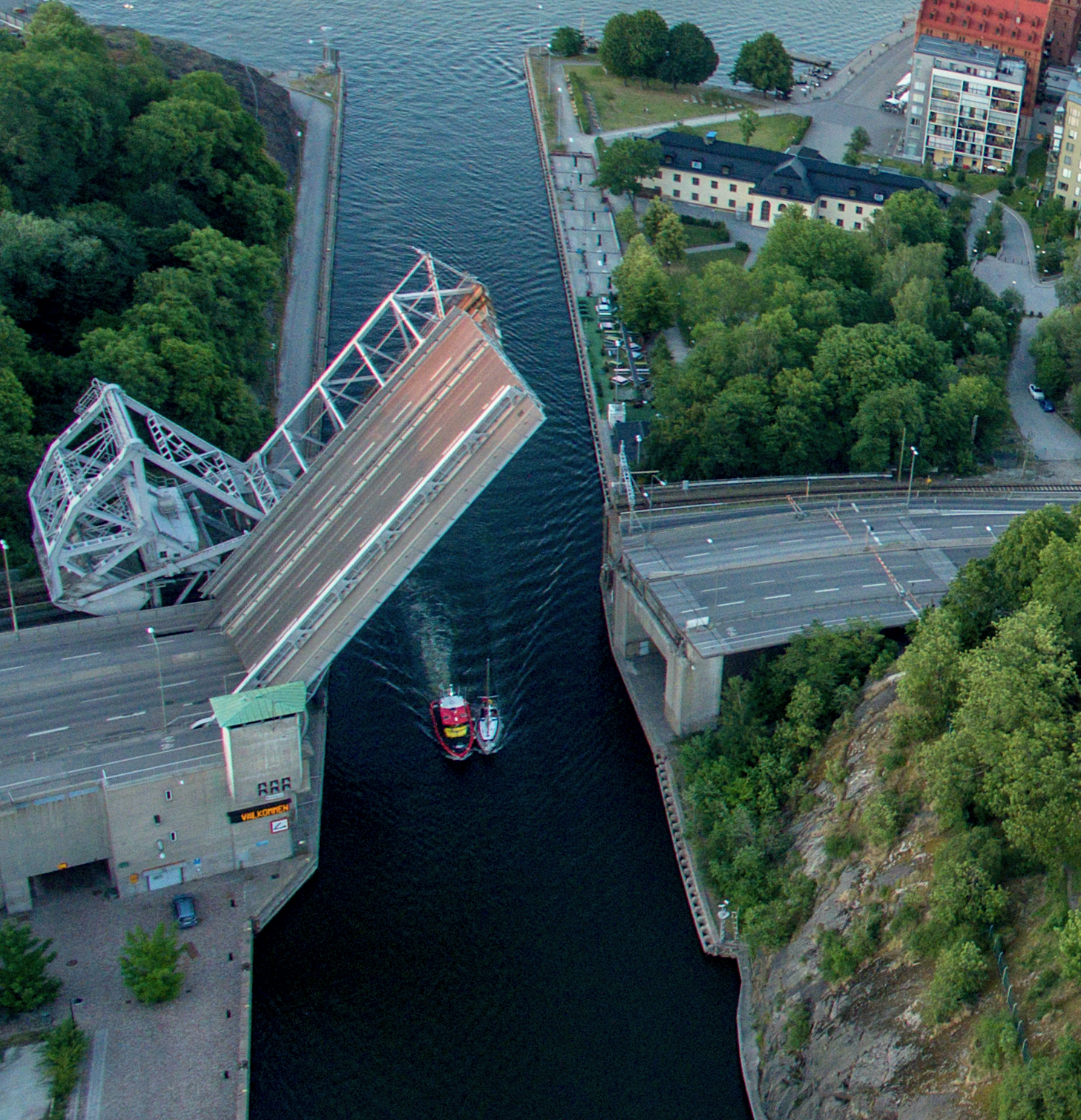
Aerial view with both bascule spans opened for canal traffic, 2016

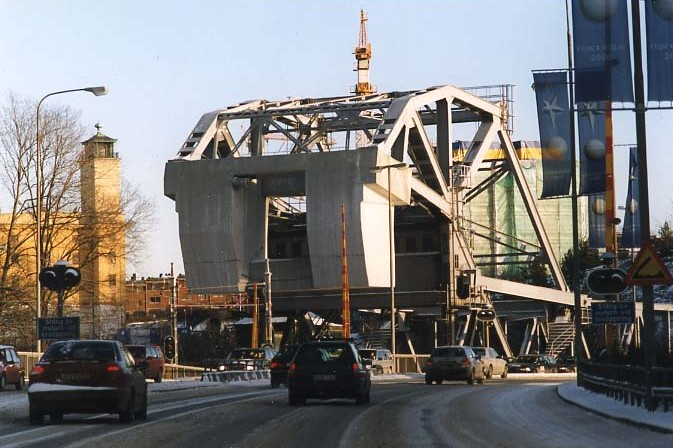
View from roadway, showing the large counterweights used for opening of the bascule spans

Danviksbron or, alternatively, Danviksbro ("Danvik Bridge") is a bascule bridge in central Stockholm, Sweden, connecting the eastern end of Södermalm to the eastern municipality Nacka. The bridge spans the Hammarbyleden canal, which carries the water of Hammarby Sjö to Saltsjön. It consists of two separate bridges which carry the Saltsjöbanan railway and a road. It is one of four movable bridges in Stockholm.

For unknown reasons, the location of the bridge, like many other places along the shores of Sweden and Norway, was named 'Danviken', meaning danernas vik, "The Bay of the Danes", and until the early 20th century most people called it Dannviken, rather than the common contemporary pronunciation of Daanviken.

== History ==
Since King Gustav Vasa (1496–1560) had the water level of the lake Hammarbysjön increased by 4.8 metres, the lake emptied into Saltsjön through a small rivulet overshadowed by a simple wooden bridge and the familiar silhouette of an old mill, and for many centuries Danviken remained mostly renowned for its hospital, Danviks hospital, which the king had moved from Riddarholmen near the city.

In 1922, a railway viaduct built in 1893 was demolished together with the old bridge, both replaced by a single-leaf bascule bridge with its concrete counterweight hanging over the 14 metres wide roadway shared by trains and vehicles. This bridge is a fixed-trunnion bridge type and a copy of a Joseph Strauss design.

On the eastern side of the canal a concrete viaduct connected to the bridge, and the bridge's load-carrying steel trusses left a horizontal clearance of 12.5 metres for the ships below.

To deal with increasing postwar traffic loads, the capacity of the bridge was increased in 1956 by adding a new bridge south of and parallel to the old, the two structures separated by less than a metre. The new bridge was 22.2 metres wide, of which 14 metres were used by vehicles, and 5 metres for bicycles and pedestrians, which effectively left the trains and bicyclists have the old bridge for themselves. A single-leaf bascule bridge was chosen again, but this time having in mind that the canal was prospected to be widened, which would hopefully be done easily by adding more bridge to the present unaltered structure.

By the 1970s traffic had increased enough again to motivate a redevelopment of the traffic system surrounding the bridge and the enlargement of the bridge itself. This was done in the period 1973–1977 by replacing one of the open-web girders with a steel girder underlying the deck, thus giving space for additional cantilevering roadways.

== Plans ==
There were plans to a new high double-track tramway bridge, carrying the Saltsjöbanan railway without delays for any bridge openings. Rising cost estimates (about 3 bn SEK plus more at Slussen station etc.) have caused the plans to be cancelled. Instead a new metro line will be built between Kungsträdgården and Nacka.

== See also ==
- List of bridges in Stockholm
- Saltsjöbanan
- Slussen
