= Hammarbyhamnen =

Port in Stockholm, Sweden

Coordinates: 59°18′16.8″N 18°5′10.16″E

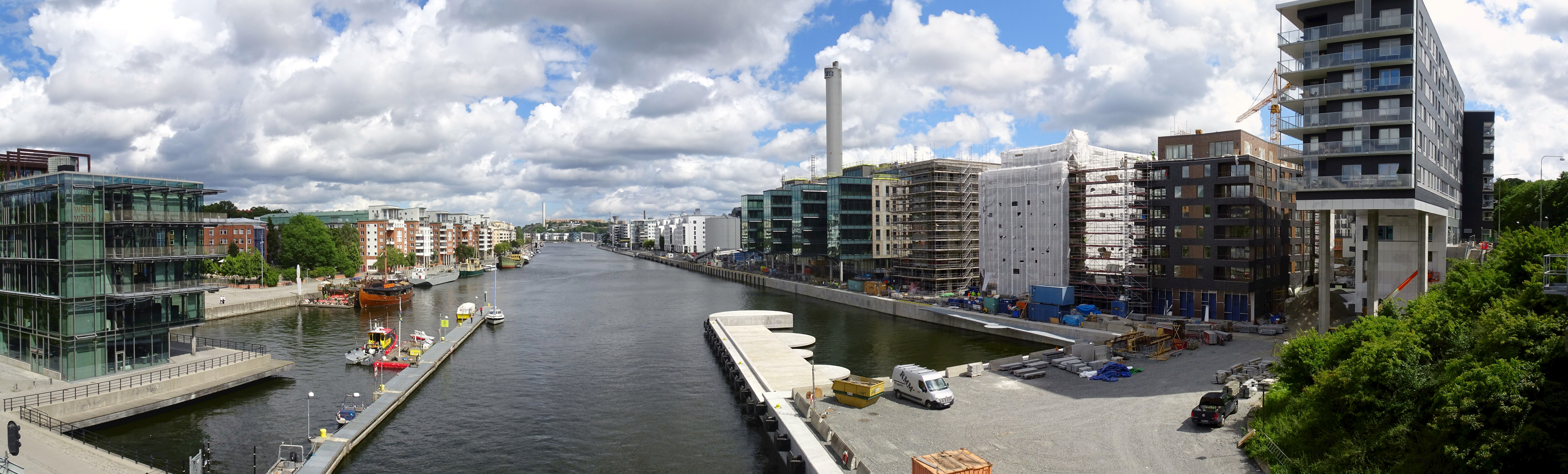
Hammarby Harbor with Northern Hammarby Harbor on the left and Southern Hammarby Harbor on the right, seen from Skansbron in July 2016

Hammarbyhamnen (lit. 'Hammarby Harbor') was a port area in southern Stockholm. The facility is divided into Norra Hammarbyhamnen and Södra Hammarbyhamnen. Its entrances are the Danvik Canal at Danvikstull and the Hammarby Lock at Skanstull. The Northern and Southern Hammarby Harbors were established in 1926 at the same time as the Hammarbyleden. Since the early 1990s, beginning with the Northern Hammarby Harbor, the former port areas have gradually been redeveloped, and the old harbor operations have been significantly reduced.

== Historia ==
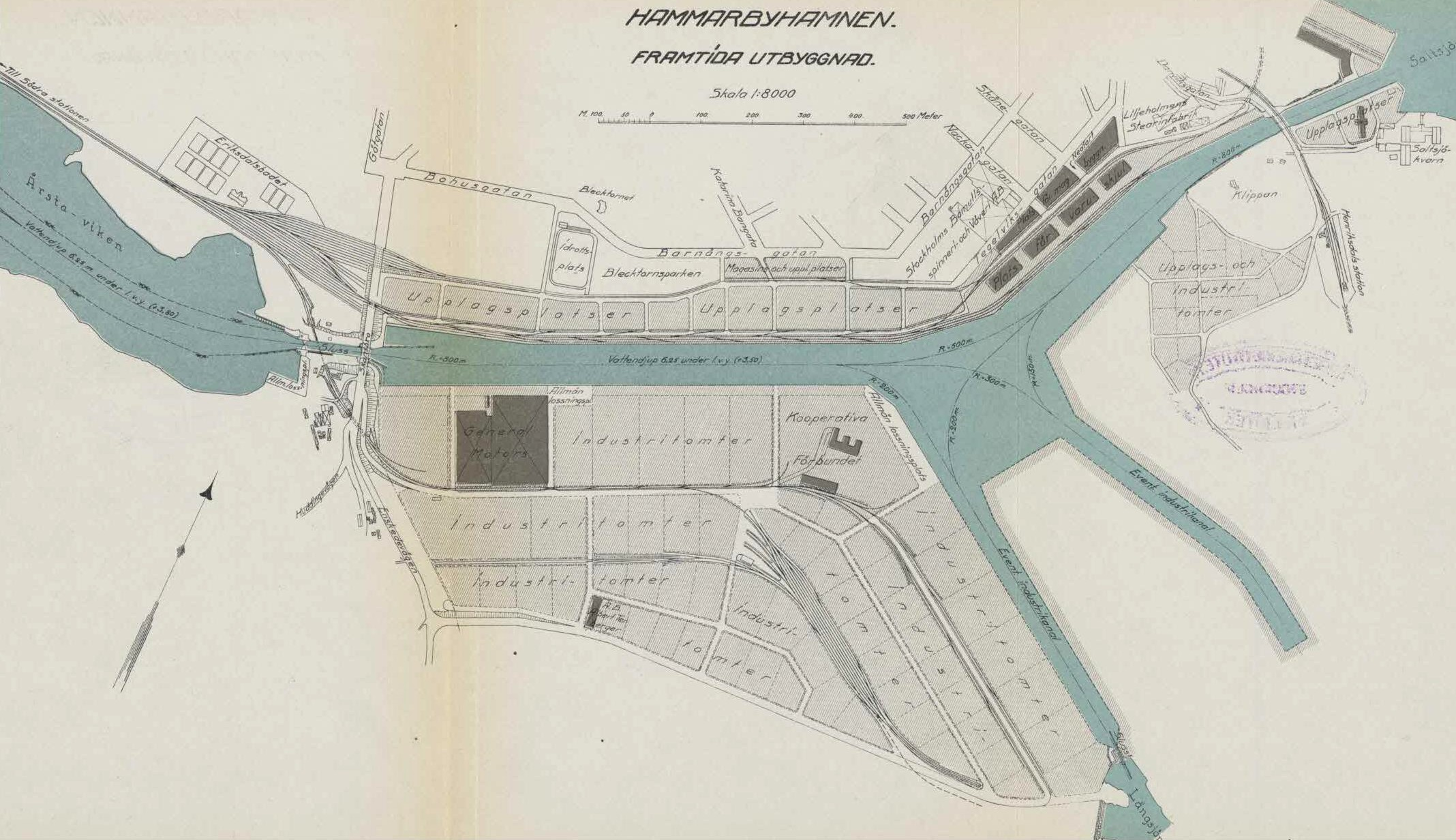
The port's expansion plan from 1929

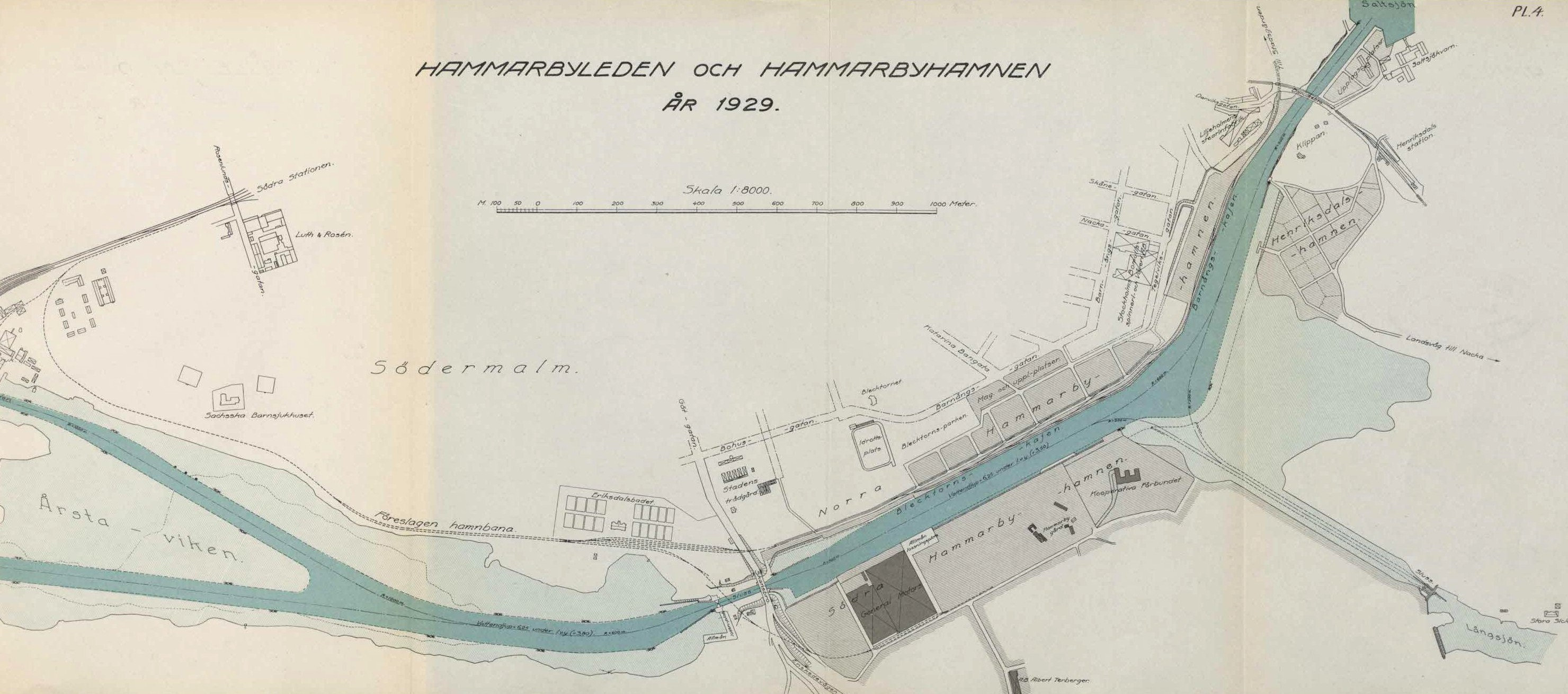
Hammarbyleden and Hammarbyhamnen in their completed state in 1929. Hammarbyhamnen's harbor railway is also visible here.

One of the purposes of the Hammarbyleden was to create a new port district, Hammarby Harbor. Because the Hammarby Lock was located far to the west, it became possible to establish a centrally located harbor with lock-free access to the Baltic Sea. This also created opportunities for new storage and industrial areas on Stockholm's extensive land holdings in southern Södermalm and northern Hammarby.

In the east was Barnäng Quay (named after the Barnängen area), which served as a general cargo and storage harbor. The central section was Blecktorn Quay (named after the Blecktorn area), which was used for bulk cargo storage, including coal, coke, and cement. In the west was a local harbor handling imports such as firewood and bricks.

Among the first industries to establish themselves here were General Motors' assembly plant in Fredriksdal and the Luma industrial area, home to the factory that produced the Luma lamp, located in Södra Hammarbyhamnen (Southern Hammarby Harbor). The Port Authority also built a crane workshop here, which was later relocated to Stockholm Free Port.

Northern Hammarby Harbor originally had a railway connection via industrial tracks to Stadsgården Harbor. A small rail yard was located north of the Hammarby Lock. An extension of the industrial railway westward, connecting it to the Southern Station area, had already been planned in 1929 but was not completed until 1939–1940 (see the Southern Station–Hammarby Harbor–Stadsgården industrial railway line). From the rail yard at Hammarby Lock, another industrial railway was planned, including a swing bridge across the lock area, continuing to Southern Hammarby Harbor and the large future industrial district known as Hammarby Industrial Area. Planning maps from 1929 also show an industrial canal farther east, but it was never completed.

However, Hammarbyleden and Hammarby Harbor never achieved the major importance for shipping and industry that had been anticipated. Only a small number of industrial facilities ultimately made use of the harbor. One reason was that parts of the canal were too shallow for oceangoing vessels. Today, virtually all industry has disappeared, and both Northern and Southern Hammarby Harbor have been redeveloped into residential neighborhoods collectively known as Hammarby Sjöstad.

== Historical images ==
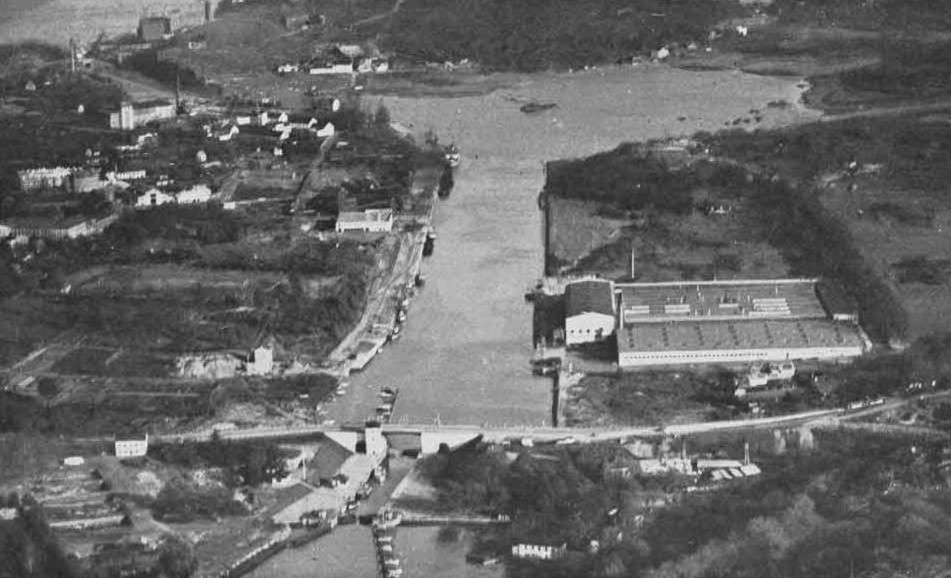
Hammarby Harbour, view east, 1929

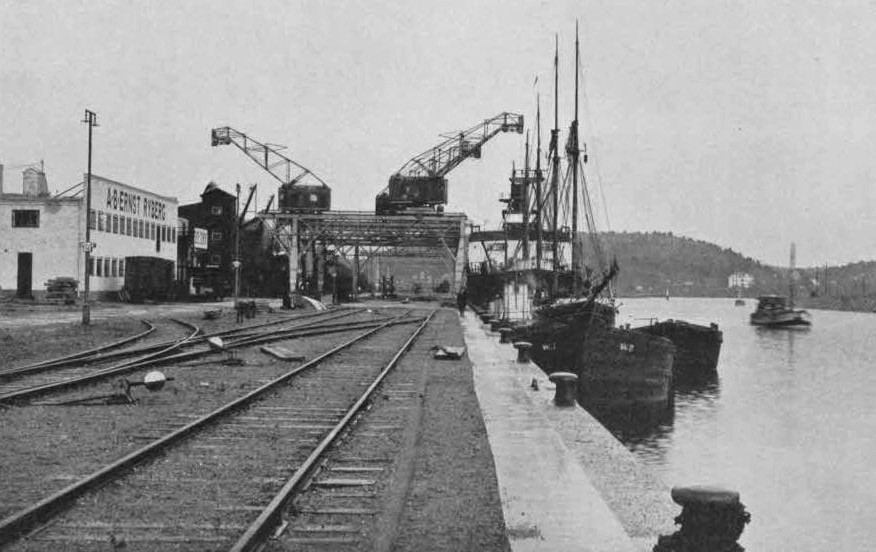
Industrial tracks along the north side, 1929

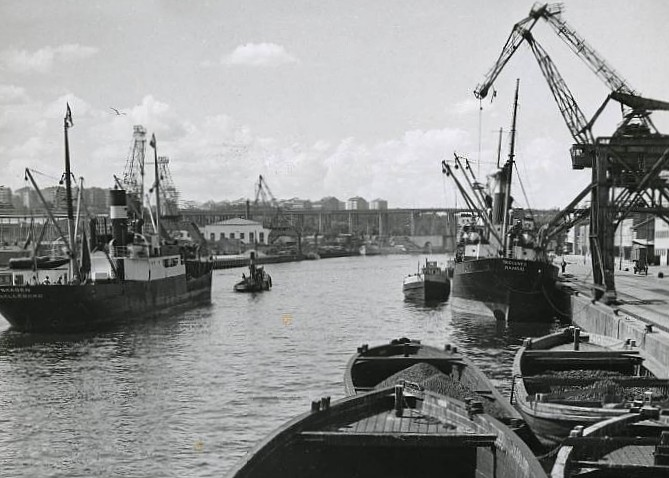
Hammarby Harbour looking west, 1949

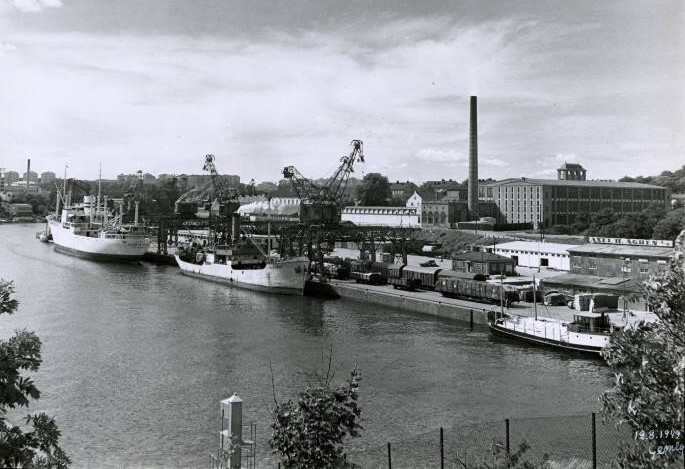
North Hammarby Harbour, 1949
