= Fryshuset =

Swedish youth organisation

Coordinates: 59°18′04″N 18°05′19″E

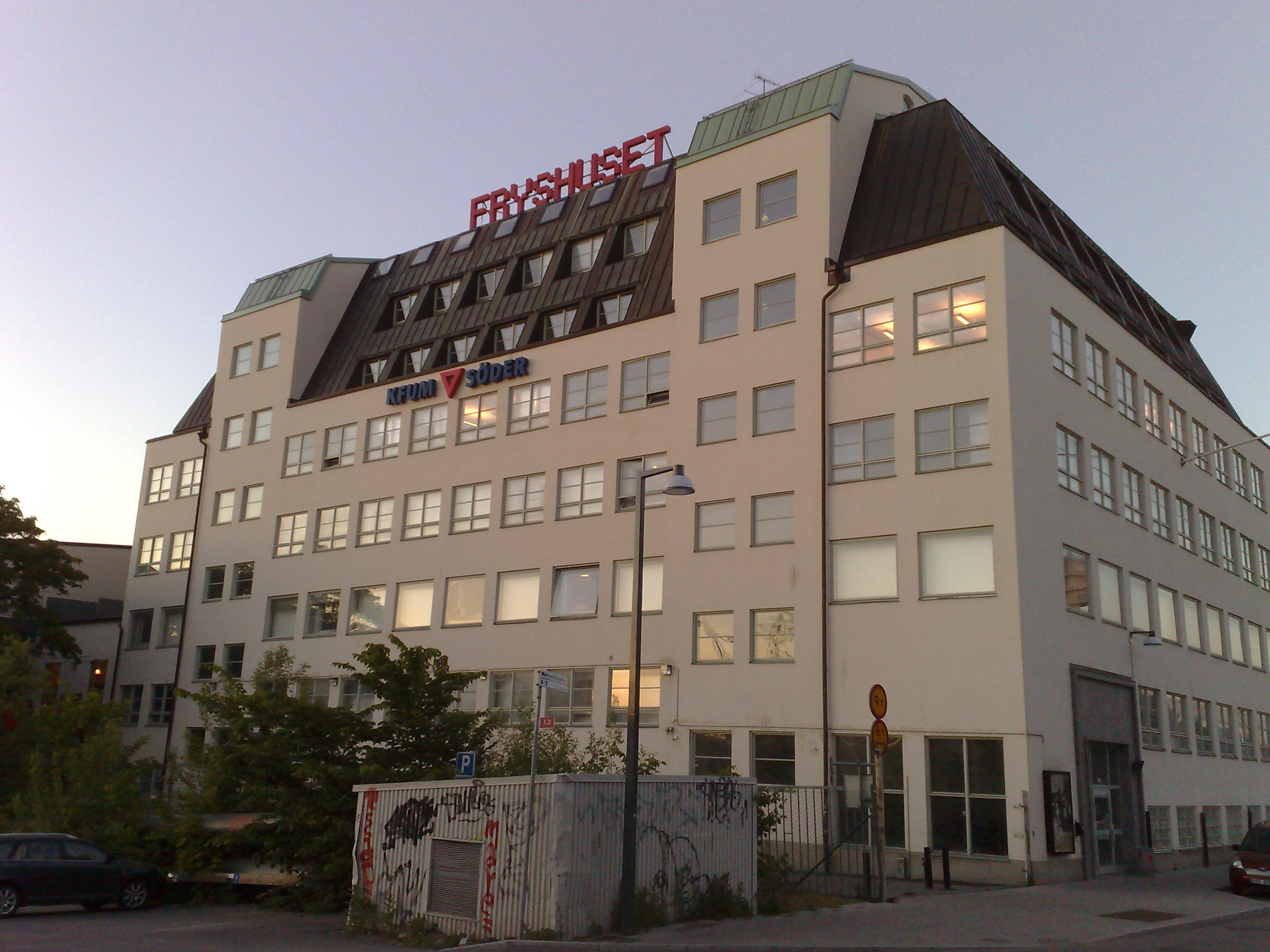
Fryshuset, a youth center in Stockholm

Fryshuset is a Swedish non-profit youth organization. Its vision is based on the conviction that encouragement, confidence, responsibility and understanding are necessary to help young people develop their innate abilities and find their way into society. Fryshuset has gained significant recognition due to the various successful social projects undertaken by the organisation through the efforts of, amongst others, the Swedish government, municipalities, and corporations.

Today Fryshuset runs a total of around 70 project, activities, educational programs and schools within four main areas;

- Role models and faith in the future (i.e. social programs)
- Youth culture
- 4 schools
- Work/Labour Market and Entrepreneurship

Fryshuset also cooperates with foreign and international organizations (such as the United Nations, the European Commission, Robert F. Kennedy Human Rights and Homeboy Industries).

Fryshuset has venues in Hammarby Sjöstad, Skärholmen, Husby, Nybro, Torsås, Östra Göinge, Gothenburg, Malmö and Borlänge.

== History ==
Fryshuset was founded in 1984 by Anders Carlberg, a well-known Swedish advocate for social justice and reconciliation. He was on the board of the YMCA of Southern Stockholm and was commissioned to find a building where YMCA could gather all its youth activities. He found an old cold storage in the outskirts of the city. It was renovated and rebuilt into a basketball hall and into music studios for young musicians. It was called Fryshuset (the Swedish word for cold storage) and soon became a meeting place for a variety of youth groups. Since then, the organization has grown steadily, today there are Fryshus branches operating in eight cities around Sweden.

Fryshuset has venues in Hammarby Sjöstad, Skärholmen, Husby, Nybro, Torsås, Östra Göinge, Gothenburg, Malmö and Borlänge.

== Activities ==
=== Rolemodels and future perspective ===
- The Brobyggarna, or "Bridge Builders" is a project aiming at guiding young boys into adulthood by giving them good role models. Boys and men get together in groups and engage in a number of activities together, but the decisive ingredient is really the relationship between the boys and their role models.
- Centre for information about destructive sub-cultures (CIDES) works with developing and disseminating effective approaches for combating the formation of subcultures such as criminal gangs, white power movements, soccer-hooligans and other destructive groups.
- The Lugna Gatan, or "Calm Street" Project started in 1995 in order to counteract violence and vandalism within Stockholm's public transportation system by hiring young adult people as role models to teenagers and young delinquent people. Since then Easy Street has become a comprehensive program of social integration and a way to get unemployed young people back into the employment market. https://ec.europa.eu/esf/transnationality/ngo-1622
- Elektra and Sharaf heroes and Sharaf heroines work against honor related violence and oppression.
- The Emerich foundation was founded by Emerich Roth, who survived Auschwitz but lost 40 family members in the Holocaust. Emerich came to Sweden after the war and worked as a social worker for 30 years. After his retirement he came to Fryshuset and lectured in schools about racism and hate and what to do about it. He set up a foundation that rewards young people's efforts to improve humanity and tolerance.
- Exit helps young people to leave Nazi, racist or other extremist movements.
- Fryshuset Web Coaches guide and support young people on the Internet.
- Passus helps people who want to leave gangs and criminal organizations. Passus provides: mental and social rehabilitation, support to families of gang members, prevention among young people and educating professionals within schools, the social service, the police, the prison and probation agency etc. Passus is a sequel to Exit (see above) which since 1998 has worked with helping people leave the White Power movements.
- Sea-life organizes sailing courses, boat trips and camps in the archipelago for kids who never had a chance to enjoy sea-oriented diversions.
- Single mothers and children of single mothers works with single mothers and children living in economically and socially exposed circumstances in order to strengthen their social network and let them enjoy things that usually costs money. The project organises activities such as kids parties and visits to the zoo and amusement parks.
- United Sisters works with boosting self-esteem and self-respect among young girls and guide them into adulthood.
- Young-in helps young people (aged 16 to 24) who do not study nor have any contact with the Employment Service – to get a job. Young-in is run by the Employment Service, Fryshuset, Friends and the authorities of Stockholm City with support from the European Social Fund.https://ec.europa.eu/esf/transnationality/ngo-1622

=== Education and training ===
- Fryshuset’s high school (Fryshuset gymnasium) offers education along with basketball, skateboarding, writing, dance, theatre, music, image and design and gaming. The school has around 900 students.
- Fryshusets elementary school for 6 to 9 graders offers elementary education along with basketball, dance, skate or music.

=== Youth Culture ===
- Fryshuset Basket is a youth basketball society based at Fryshuset, with around 3500 registered players.
- F.U.S.E works with young musicians, performers and bands in order to give them the information they need to create a platform in the music industry. F.U.S.E also produces and releases records. F.U.S.E is an abbreviation of the Swedish words for Company, Education, Support and Commitment.
- The Gym is the sports club at Fryshuset.
- Lovely Days offers sports and cultural activities to kids during school holidays.
- The Music Department is home to around 600 musicians and 100 bands rehearsing in 39 music studios and to Fryshuset's concert venues; The Club and The Arena.
- Night Courses offers evening courses in music, dance and theatre, electric guitar, electric bass, drums, keyboards, DJ mixing, DJ-courses for girls and music production.
- Stockholm Skate Park is an indoor arena for skateboarding. The hall covers 1600 square meters and is the home ground for Fryshuset high school's skateboarding classes.
- Theatre Fryshuset writes and produces plays about contemporary social issues, such as The burning ghetto and Top Boys – a hooligan's story.

=== Also at Fryshuset ===
- Fryshuset at Almedalen – every year Fryshuset participates in Sweden's biggest annual political get-together Almedalsveckan. One week in July, politicians, lobby-groups, organisations, business and the media gathers to debate Sweden's future. Fryshuset emphasizes young people's situation and possibilities.
- Fryshuset Church is a cooperation between the Diocese of Stockholm, Sofia parish and EFS Mittsverige (a branch within the Swedish church). The purpose is to encourage and support contemplation about major issues such as the meaning of life, good and evil, etc.
- Fryshuset Kitchen and Café is the restaurant at Fryshuset.

== See also ==
- The Fryshus murder
