= Hammarby Sjö =

Watercourse in central Stockholm, Sweden

Coordinates: 59°18′27″N 18°06′00″E

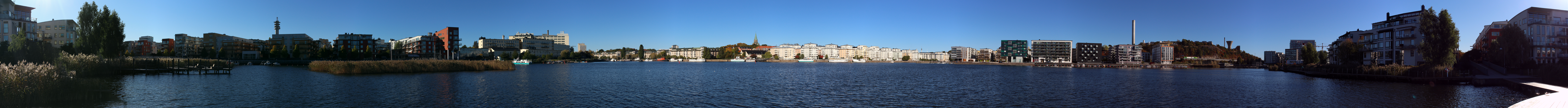
Hammarby Sjö and surrounding settlements viewed from Sickla kaj.

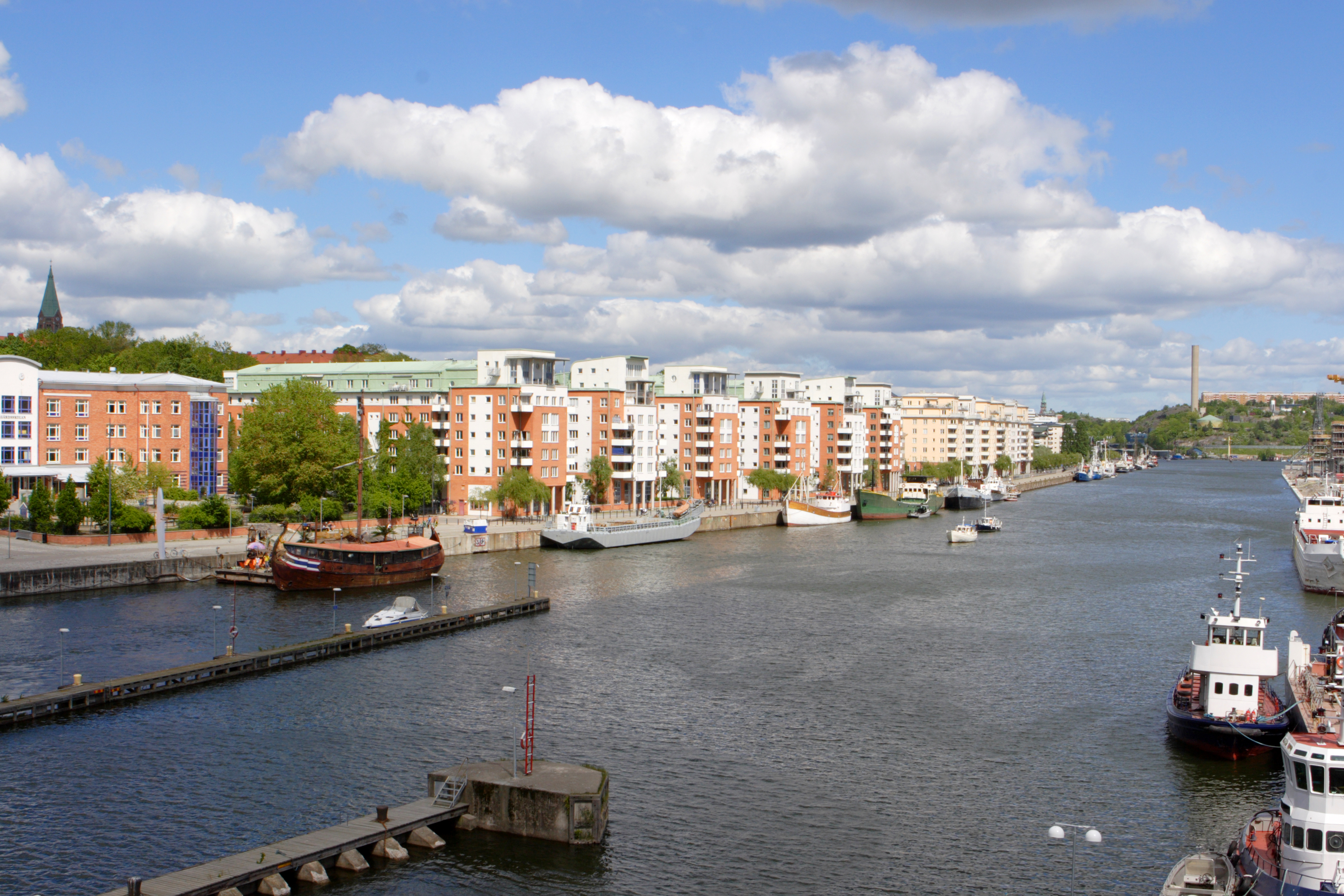
Hammarby Sjö and Norra Hammarbyhamnen viewed from Skansbron.

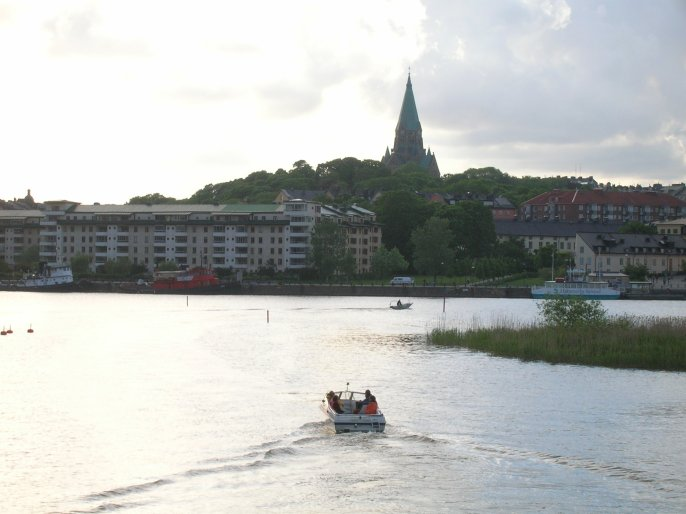
Hammarby sjö and Södermalm with Sofia kyrka viewed from Södra Hammarbyhamnen.

Hammarby sjö (Swedish: "Lake Hammarby") is a watercourse in central Stockholm, Sweden. Separating Stockholm City Centre from South Stockholm, or, more locally, Norra Hammarbyhamnen on eastern Södermalm from Södra Hammarbyhamnen, it connects Saltsjön to Årstasjön.

Covering a surface of 34 hectares and having an average depth of 4.5 metres (maximum 6 metres), Hammarby sjö is supplied by a drainage area covering 159 hectares and contains 1,600,000 cubic metres of water. Originally a lake about 3 metres deep, it was transformed into a canal when connected to Saltsjön in the 1920s and a 6 metres deep channel was dug between Hammarbyslussen and Saltsjön and another to Sickla sluss. The importance of the water expanse has grown since the late 20th century as new residential areas have been constructed along its shores.

Four bridges stretch over Hammarby Sjö and connected bodies of water: Danviksbron, Skansbron, Skanstullsbron and Johanneshovsbron.

== See also ==
- Geography of Stockholm
