= Hammarby Sjöstad =

Part of the inner city of Stockholm, Sweden

Coordinates: 59°18′19″N 18°06′18″E

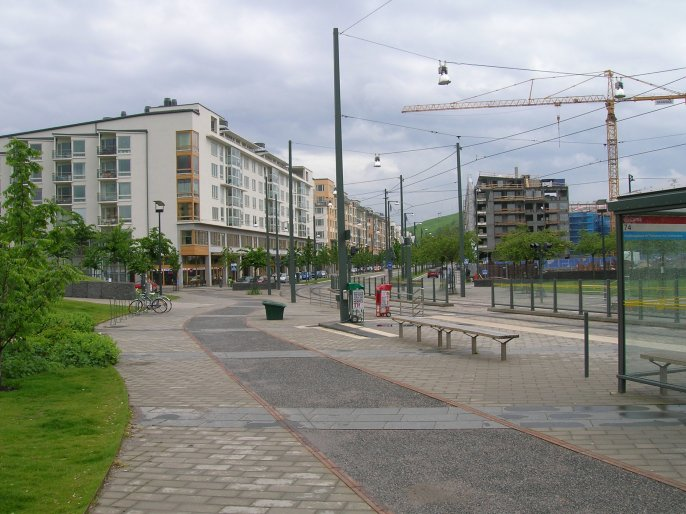
Hammarby Allé, Hammarby Sjöstad

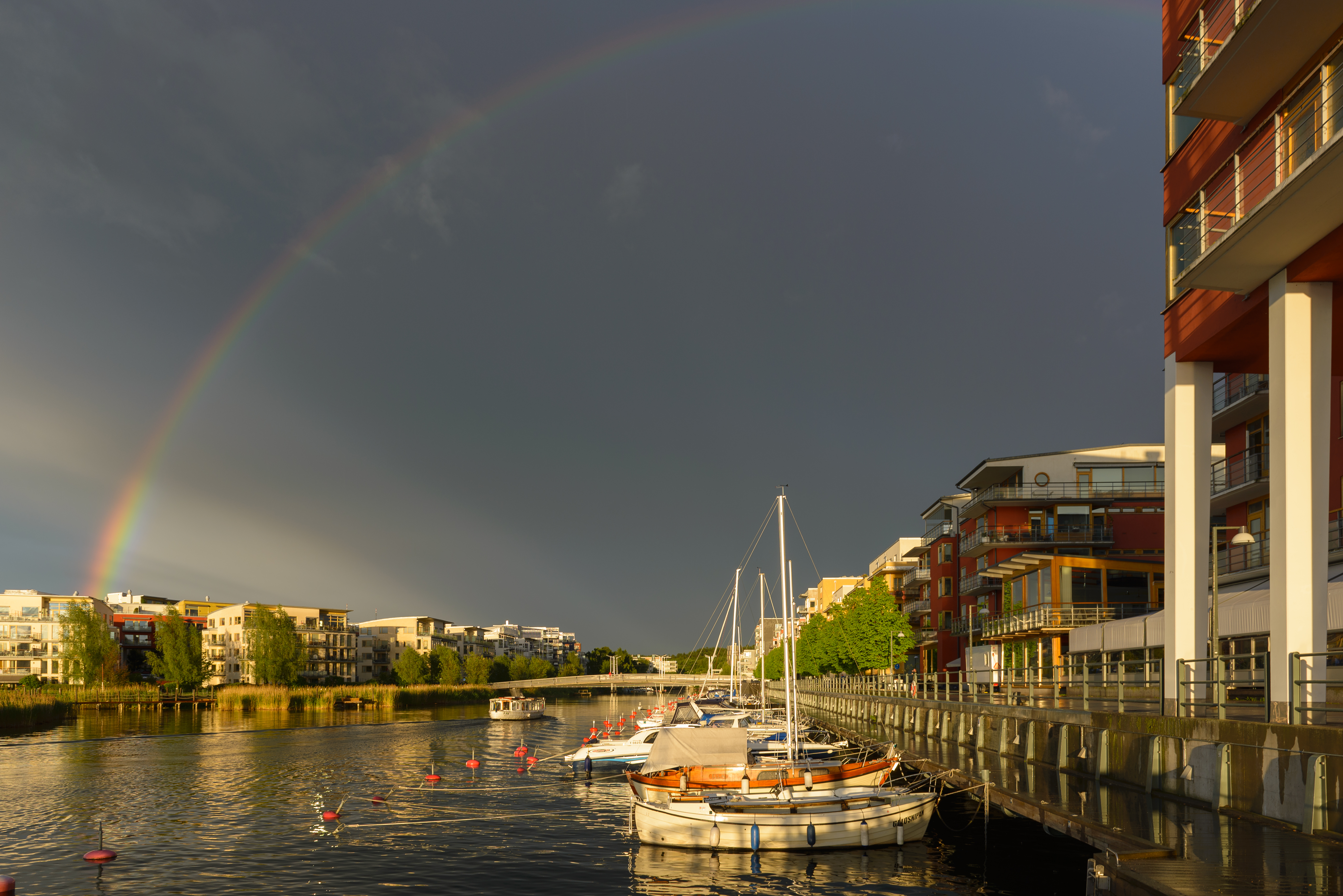
Sickla Udde (left) and Sickla Kaj

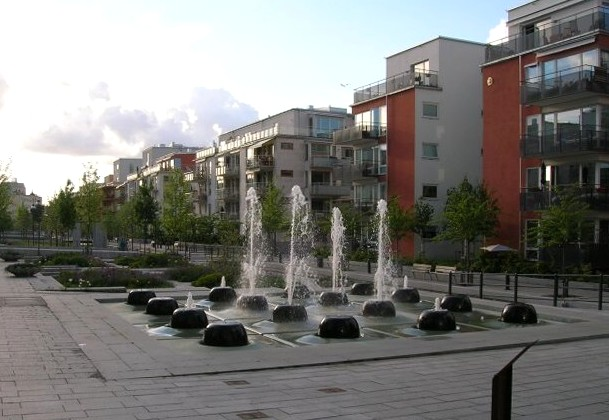
Sjöstadsparterren, Hammarby Sjöstad, 2005

Hammarby Sjöstad is a part of the inner city of Stockholm, currently undergoing major urban redevelopment as a new residential area.

It is located on both sides of lake Hammarby Sjö, bordering Nacka Municipality to the east. The area is part of the districts Södermalm and Södra Hammarbyhamnen.

Before the current redevelopment began, the area was known as Norra Hammarbyhamnen and Södra Hammarbyhamnen, a mainly industrial zone centered on the Lumafabriken works, a piece of functionalist architecture designed by Eskil Sundahl and Arthur von Schmalensee, which now houses a library, restaurants, and offices. The neighbouring Lugnet was a run-down light industrial area, not intended to be permanent, housing an impromptu trailer park. On the north side of the lake, the Norra Hammarbyhamnen area was used as a harbour area, with a railway connecting the area.

New plans for most of the Södermalm area Norra Hammarbyhamnen in the early 1990s opened the door for a redevelopment of the entire area around the water expanse Hammarby Sjö. A general plan, featuring an extension of the Tvärbanan light rail link from Gullmarsplan through the area was presented.

Although the south and east part of Hammarby Sjöstad is located outside what is traditionally considered to be the perimeter of inner-city Stockholm, the design is intentionally semi-urban rather than suburban, with boulevards, somewhat defined and architecturally varied city blocks, and commercial spaces in the ground floor of some buildings. The location, next to the lake Hammarby Sjö and a canal, Sickla Kanal, has allowed for plenty of quays and walkways along the water.

The area also included the 1940s area Danviksklippan that remains unchanged of the ongoing development. Neighbourhoods includes most of Norra Hammarbyhamnen, Tegelviksgatan, Sickla Udde, Sickla Kaj, Luma and Sickla Kanal.

Administratively, Hammarby Sjöstad is a part of Hammarby in the Stockholm Municipality borough of Södermalm. It belonged to the former borough of Katarina-Sofia, which merged with Maria-Gamla Stan borough into Södermalm borough on January 1, 2007.
