= Hammarby, Stockholm =

Part of southern Stockholm, Sweden

Coordinates: 59°18′11.88″N 18°5′29.54″E

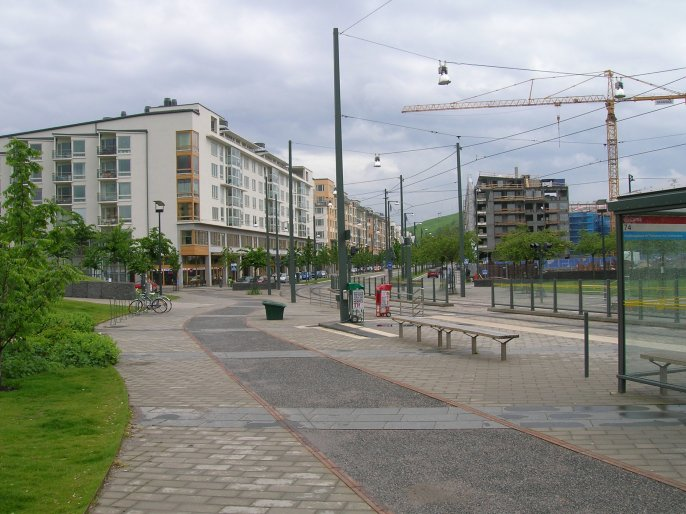

Hammarby is a part of southern Stockholm, located southeast of Södermalm, east of Årsta and Globen, and west of Nacka.

Hammarby Sjöstad is a new residential district being developed from wasteground.

== Sports ==
Hammarby is known for the sports club Hammarby IF. The club was founded in Hammarby in 1889.

== See also ==
- Södra Länken
- Tvärbanan
