= Hammarbyleden =

Artificial waterway in Stockholm, Sweden

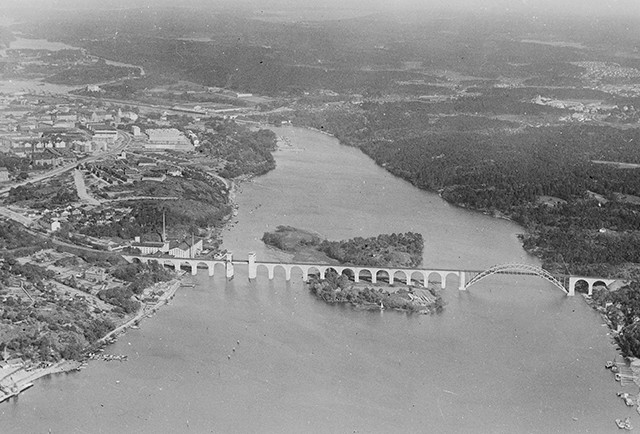
The Årstaviken area of the waterway (looking east). One of the Årstabroarna bridges can be seen crossing the waterway.

Hammarbyleden is an artificial waterway in Stockholm which connects Lake Mälaren with Saltsjön, the westernmost bay of the Baltic Sea. The waterway is located along the southern edge of Södermalm, one of Stockholm's many islands.

The waterway is composed mostly of interconnected natural bodies of water, which were expanded and dredged in the late-1910s and 1920s; the waterway was opened in 1929. A water lock was constructed as part of the project to account for the water level variation between Lake Mälaren and the Baltic Sea.

== Route ==
The waterway begins at Liljeholmsviken (near the eastern edge of Lake Mälaren) where it flows east into Årstaviken. At the eastern end of Årstaviken is the water lock, called Hammarby Lock, which lowers the water level from Årstaviken into Hammarby Sjö (Hammarby Lake). The final connection between Hammarby Lake and Saltsjön is made through the Danvik Canal. The canal meets Saltsjön near the wharf of Masthamnen.
