= Saltsjön =

Bay of the Baltic Sea in Sweden

Coordinates: 59°19′7.15″N 18°6′27.1″E

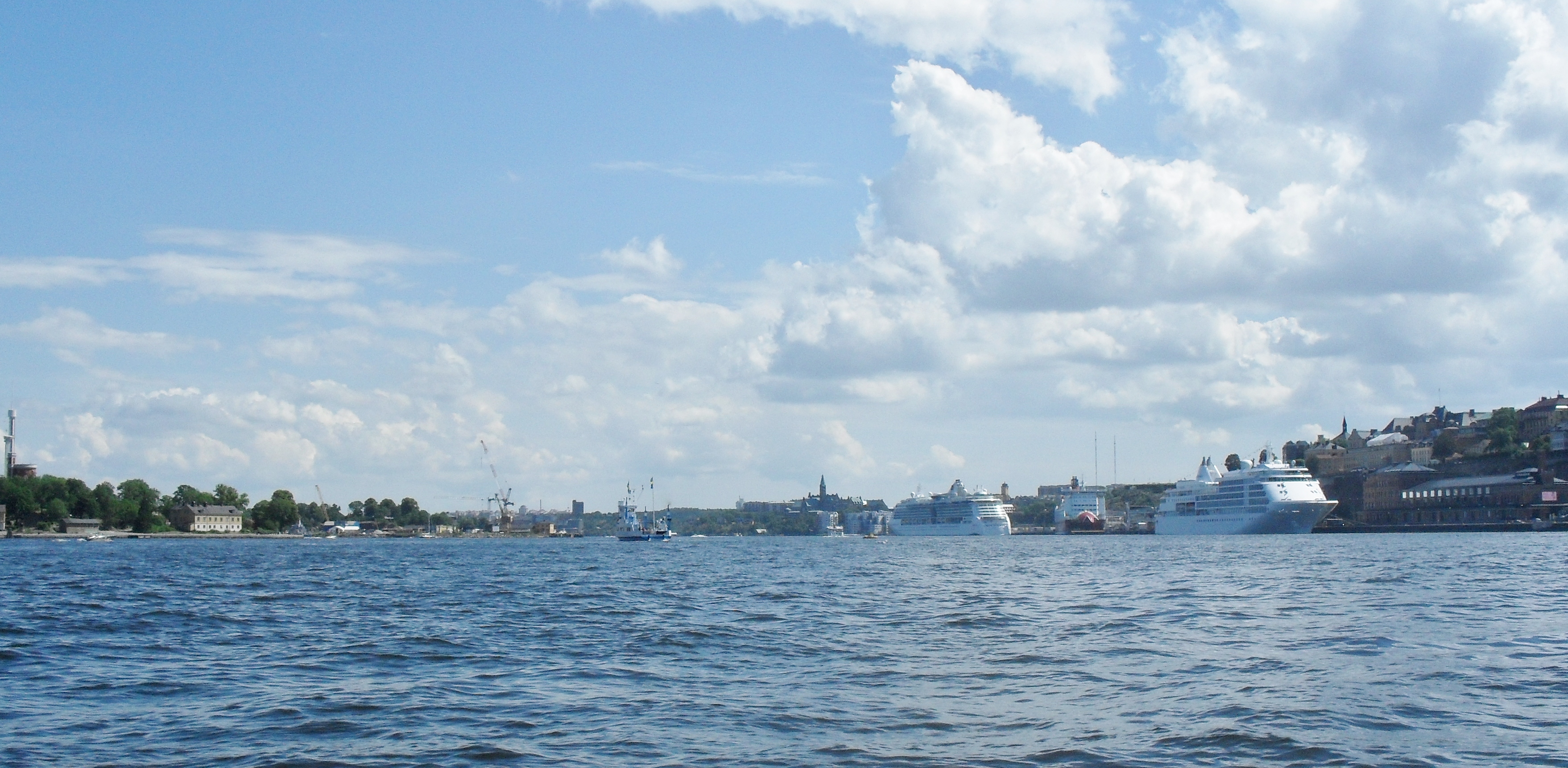
Cruiseferry ships in port at Saltsjön.

Saltsjön is a bay of the Baltic Sea that extends from Stockholm archipelago to the inner city of Stockholm. Its innermost part reaches the eastern shore of Gamla stan at Skeppsbrokajen. It is navigable for large craft and the major ferry lines to and from Stockholm pass through it. Saltsjön is connected to Lake Mälaren through Norrström, through Karl Johanslussen at Slussen, and through Hammarbyslussen and Hammarbyleden.

Saltsjö or Saltsjön may also denote other parts of the Baltic in the Stockholm region, as opposed to Mälaren or inland lakes. The word appears as part of place names such as Saltsjöbaden, Saltsjö-Boo or Saltsjö-Duvnäs which are not related to Saltsjön proper.

Several cultural institutions are situated along its shoreline, including Fotografiska, which occupies a historic former customs house on Stadsgården overlooking the bay.
