= Sickla (disambiguation) =

Sickla is a retail park and shopping district in Nacka, Sweden.

Sickla may also refer to:

- Sicklasjön, a lake in Stockholm and Nacka, Sweden
- Sicklaön, a peninsula in Stockholm and Nacka, Sweden
- Sickla kanal, a canal in Stockholm and Nacka, Sweden
- Sickla udde, a residential area in the district of Hammarby Sjöstad in Stockholm, Sweden

== See also ==
- Sicklauddsbron, a pedestrian bridge in the residential district of Hammarby Sjöstad, Sweden
- Sickla kanalbro, a motorway bridge in Stockholm, Sweden
