= Hammarby kanal metro station =

Hammarby kanal
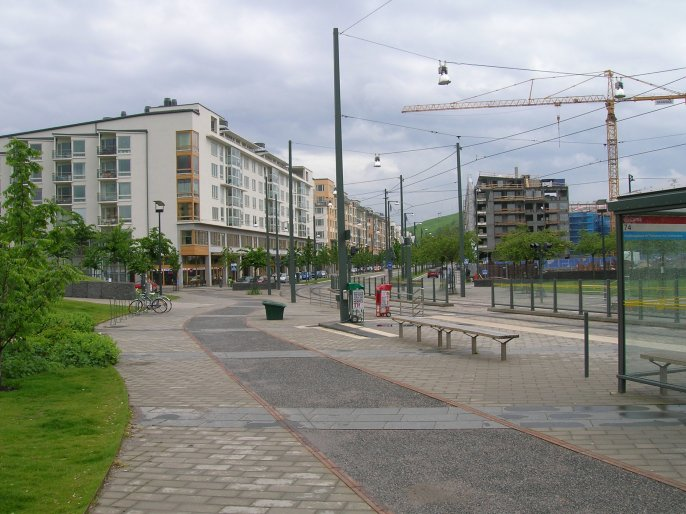
- Entrance site at Hammarby Sjöstad before construction

General information
- Location: Södermalm & Hammarby Sjöstad, Stockholm
- Coordinates: 59°19′01.2″N 18°05′13.2″E
- System: Future Stockholm Metro station
- Line: Blue Line
- Platforms: 1 island platform
- Tracks: 2
- Connections: Tvärbanan (Luma)

Construction
- Structure type: Underground
- Depth: 35–40 m (115–131 ft)

History
- Opened: Planned for 2030

Services
Preceding station: Sofia
Proceeding station: Sickla
Location

Hammarby kanal is a future station on the Stockholm Metro's Blue Line. Upon completion in 2030, it will serve the neighborhoods of Södermalm and Hammarby Sjöstad, with entrances on either side of the Hammarby Canal, which the station will be located under. The station is part of the Blue Line extension from Kungsträdgården towards Nacka.

== Location and entrances ==
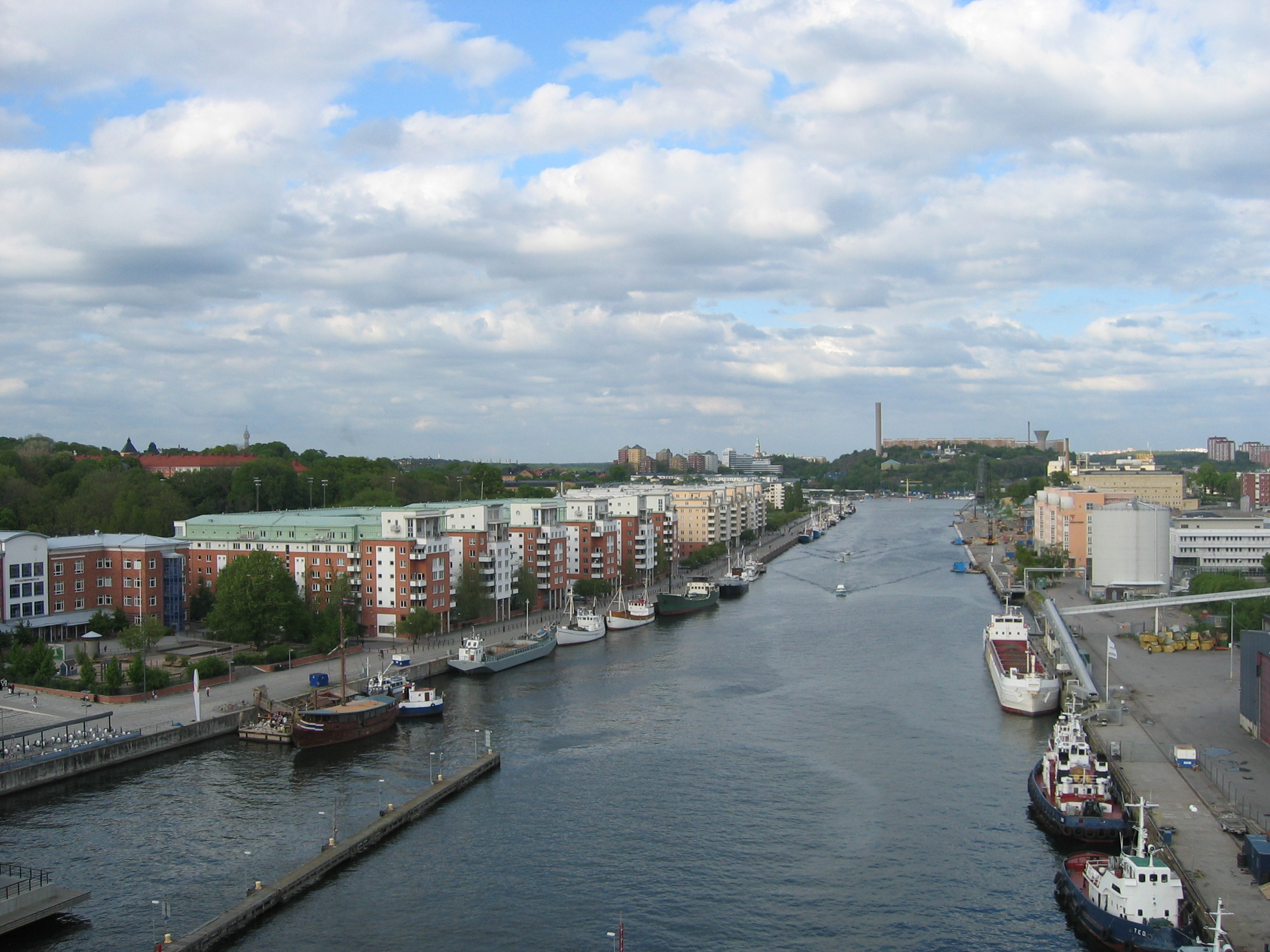
The hammarby canal - under which the station is being built

Hammarby kanal station will be situated approximately 35 to 40 meters beneath the Hammarby Canal, making it the first metro station in Stockholm with a platform constructed under water. There will be two main exits: the northern entrance will be located near Vintertullstorget on Katarina Bangata in Södermalm, while the southern entrance will be at Luma park in Hammarby Sjöstad. The southern exit will also offer transfers to the Tvärbanan light rail and bus services at Luma. The Blue Line will extend from Kungsträdgården via Sofia and Hammarby Sjöstad to Nacka.

== Construction ==
The construction of the station is part of the Blue Line extension project, and started in 2020. Tunnels under the canal were completed in April 2024, when the tunneling teams from the north and south met 41.5 meters below the surface. Future work includes installing the platform, escalators, and other necessary facilities for the station, with the entire project expected to be completed and operational by 2030. Construction challenges included dealing with weaker rock conditions beneath the canal, requiring extra reinforcement and careful blasting techniques.
