= List of shopping centres in Sweden =

This is an incomplete list of shopping centres in Sweden.

== Blekinge County ==
- Amiralen Shopping Centre, Karlskrona
- Modehuset Kronan, Karlskrona
- Slottsbacken Shopping Centre, Karlskrona
- Wachtmeister Galleria, Karlskrona

== Dalarna County ==
- Falan Galleria, Falun
- Hjultorget Shopping Centre, Leksand
- Kupolen, Borlänge
- Norra Backa, Borlänge

== Gävleborg County ==
- E-Center, Söderhamn
- Flanör, Gävle
- Gallerian Nian, Gävle
- Hemlingby Shopping Centre, Gävle
- Valbo Shopping Centre, Gävle

== Halland County ==
- Eurostop, Halmstad
- Flygstaden Shopping Centre, Halmstad
- Freeport Shopping Centre, Kungsbacka
- Gallerian, Varberg
- Gekås, Falkenberg
- Kungsmässan Shopping Centre, Kungsbacka

== Jämtland County ==
- Lillänge, Östersund
- Mittpunkten, Östersund

== Jönköping County ==
- Asecs, Jönköping
- Rosengallerian, Jönköping
- Sesamgallerian, Jönköping
- Solås Center, Jönköping

== Kalmar County ==
- Handelsområde Knekten, Hultsfred
- Baronen Shopping Centre, Kalmar
- Giraffen Shopping Centre, Kalmar
- Hansa City, Kalmar
- Kvasten Shopping Centre, Kalmar
- Ölands Köpstad, Färjestaden

== Kronoberg County ==
- Affärshuset Tegnér, Växjö
- Grand Samarkand, Växjö
- Handelsplats I11, Växjö
- Kosta Outlet, Lessebo
- Linnégallerian, Växjö

== Norrbotten County ==
- Ikano Retail Centre, Haparanda
- Shopping Galleria, Luleå
- Smedjan, Luleå
- Strand Galleria, Luleå
- Storheden Shopping Centre, Luleå
- Gallerian Piteå, Piteå
- Småstaden, Piteå
- BackCity, Piteå
- Enter Galleria, Boden
- 43:an Galleria, Boden
- Galleria Kalix, Kalix
- Norrskensgallerian, Gällivare
- Galleria Sjuan, Kiruna
- Galleria Åttan, Kiruna
- Galleria Nian, Kiruna

== Skåne County ==
=== Malmö ===
- Bulltofta Handelsområde
- Caroli
- Emporia (shopping mall)
- Entré, Malmö
- Hansagallerian
- Jägersro
- Mobilia, Malmö
- Rosengård Centrum
- Svågertorp
- Triangeln, Malmö

=== Other municipalities ===
- Burlöv Shopping Centre, Burlöv
- Center Syd, Kävlinge
- Hyllinge Shopping Centre, Åstorp
- Lödde Centrum, Kävlinge
- Nova Lund, Lund
- Stora Bernstorp, Burlöv
- Söderpunkten, Helsingborg
- Väla Centrum, Helsingborg

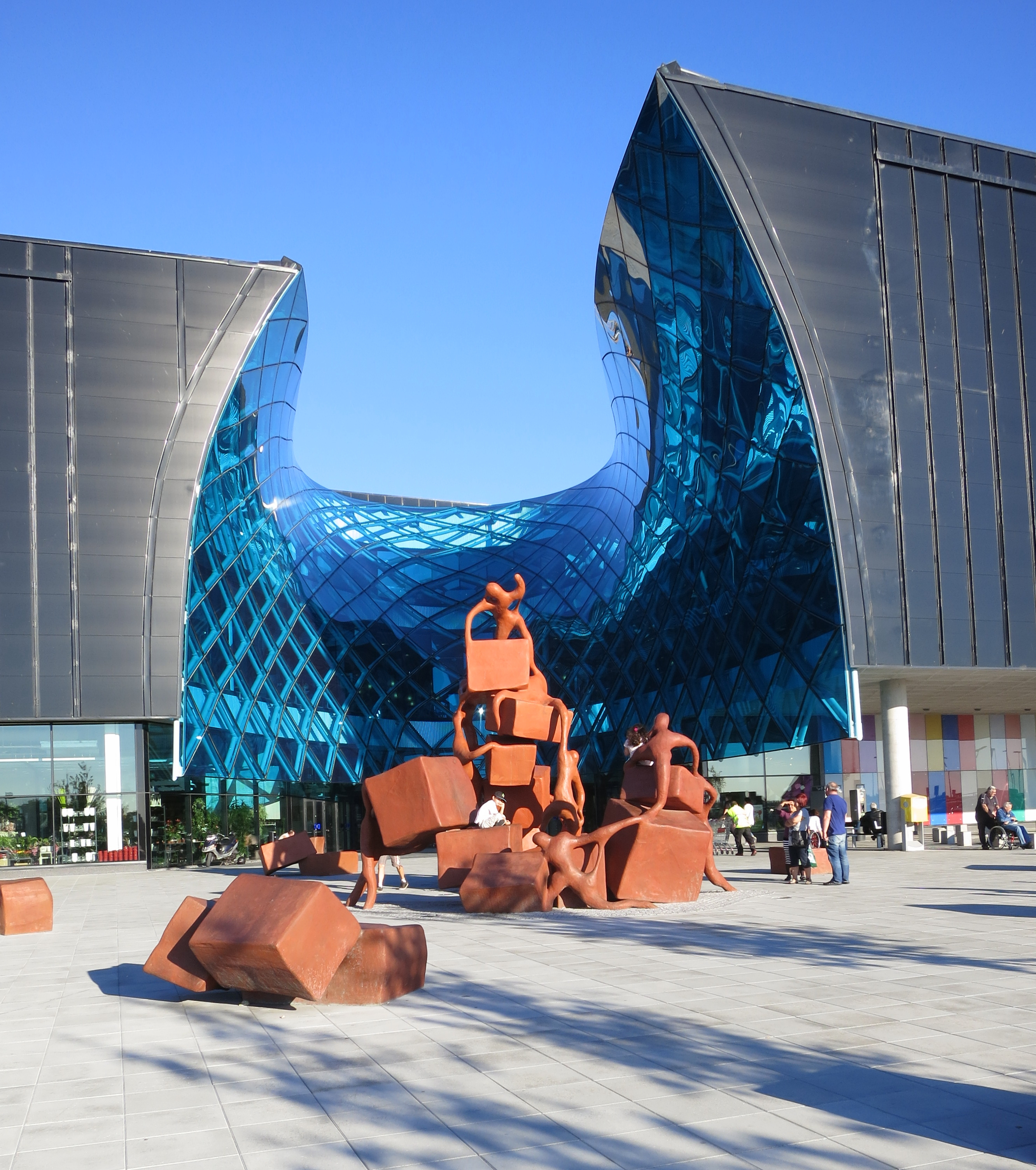
West entrance, Emporia

== Södermanland County ==
- 114 Factory Outlet, Vingåker
- 21:an, Eskilstuna
- Cityhuset, Eskilstuna
- Folkesta Shopping Centre, Eskilstuna
- Gallerian, Eskilstuna, Eskilstuna
- Gumsbacken Shopping Centre, Nyköping
- Tuna Park, Eskilstuna

== Stockholm County ==
=== Stockholm Municipality ===
- Bromma Blocks
- Farsta Centrum
- Fältöversten
- Gallerian
- Globen Shopping
- Ringen Centrum
- Vällingby Centrum
- Kista Galleria
- Liljeholmstorget
- MOOD Stockholm
- Nordiska Kompaniet
- PUB
- Skrapan
- Skärholmen Centrum (SKHLM)
- Sturegallerian
- Västermalmsgallerian

=== South ===
- Haninge Centrum, Handen
- Lidingö Centrum, Lidingö
- Nacka Forum, Nacka
- Sickla Köpkvarter, Nacka
- Tyresö Centrum, Tyresö

==== Huddinge ====
- Heron City
- Huddinge Centrum
- Kungens Kurva
- Länna Shopping Centre

==== Södertälje ====
- Kringlan, Södertälje
- Moraberg
- Weda Shopping Centre

==== Botkyrka ====
- Hallunda centrum, Hallunda

=== North ===
- Arninge Centrum, Täby
- Barkarby Shopping Centre, Jakobsberg
- Eurostop Arlandastad, Sigtuna
- Infracity, Upplands Väsby
- Sollentuna Centrum, Sollentuna
- Solna Centrum, Solna
- Stinsen Shoppingcenter, Häggvik
- Mörby Centrum, Danderyd
- Täby Centrum, Täby
- Veddesta Shopping Centre, Jakobsberg
- Väsby Centrum, Upplands Väsby
- Westfield Mall of Scandinavia, Solna
- Westfield Täby Centrum
- Åkersberga Centrum, Österåker

== Uppsala County ==
- Bolandcity, Uppsala
- Bålsta Shopping Centre, Håbo
- Gottsunda Shopping Centre, Uppsala
- Gränby Centrum, Uppsala
- Forumgallerian, Uppsala
- St. Per Gallerian, Uppsala
- Stenhagen Centrum, Uppsala

== Värmland County ==
- Bergvik Shopping Centre, Karlstad
- Charlottenbergs Shoppingcenter, Charlottenberg
- Duvan, Karlstad
- Mitt i City, Karlstad
- Töcksfors Handelspark, Töcksfors
- Våxnäs Shopping Centre, Karlstad
- Välsvikens Handelsområde, Karlstad

== Västerbotten County ==
=== Skellefteå ===
- Citykompaniet
- Solbacken
- Galleria Vintergatan

=== Umeå ===
- Avion Shopping
- Ersboda Shopping Centre
- MVG Umeå
- Strömpilen
- Sagagallerian
- Utopia

== Västernorrland County ==
- Birsta city, Sundsvall
- Ingallerian, Sundsvall
- Oscarsgallerian, Örnsköldsvik
- Prima galleria, Sollefteå
- Citygallerian, Sollefteå

== Västmanland County ==
- Erikslund Shopping Center, Västerås
- Hälla Shopping, Västerås
- Punkt Gallerian, Västerås

== Västra Götaland County ==
=== Gothenburg ===
- Angered Shopping Centre
- Arkaden, Gothenburg
- Backaplan ShoppingCentre
- Bäckebol Homecenter
- Frölunda Torg
- Högsbo 421
- Kompassen
- Nordiska Kompaniet, Gothenburg
- Nordstan
- Sisjön Shopping Centre

=== Other municipalities ===
- Allum Shopping Center, Partille
- Commerce Shopping Center, Skövde
- Knalleland, Borås
- Kållared Köpstad, Mölndal
- Nordby Shopping Center, Strömstad
- Torp Köpcentrum, Uddevalla
- Stenungs Torg, Stenungsund
- Överby Shopping Centre, Trollhättan

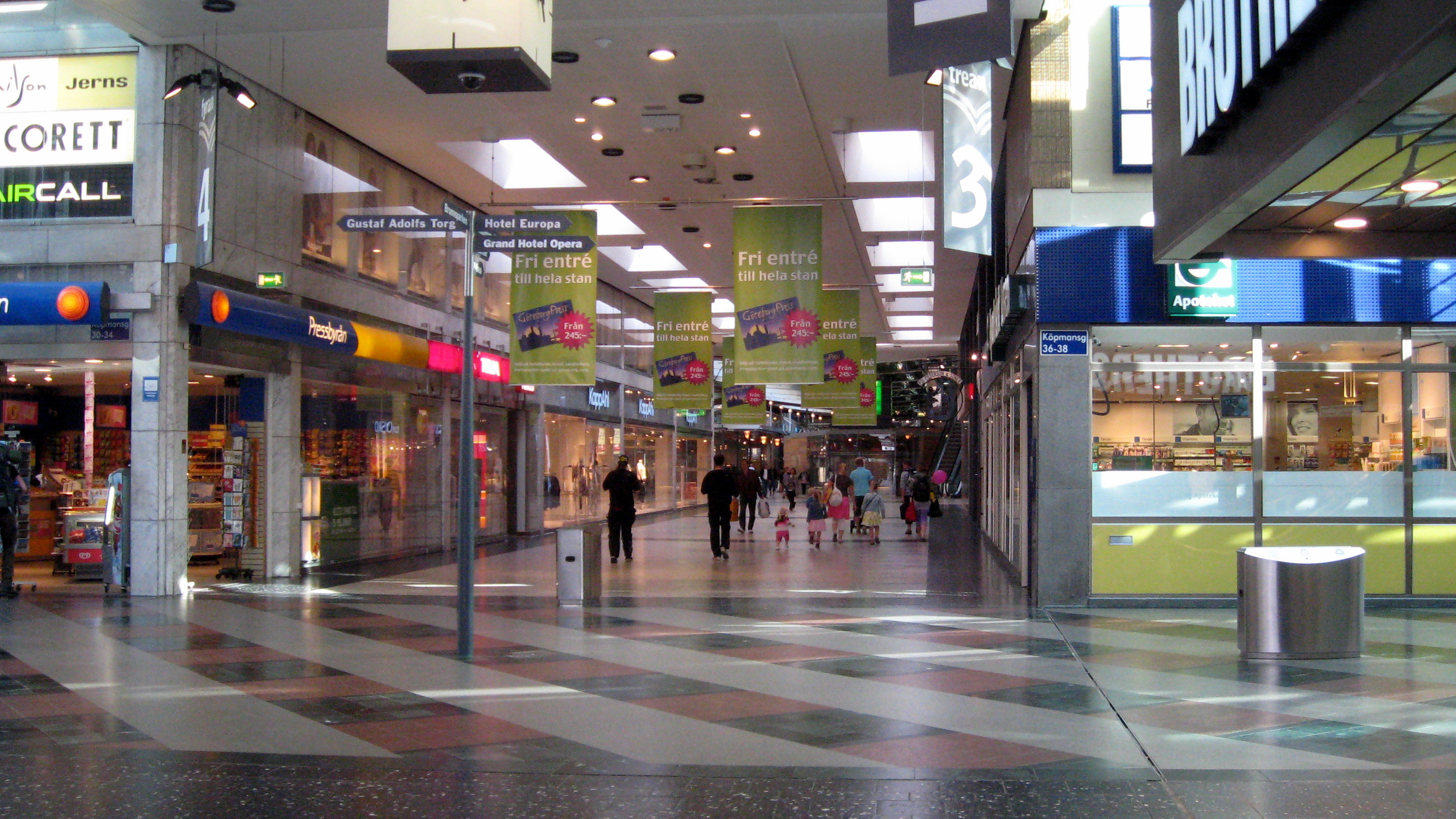
Nordstan, Gothenburg

== Örebro County ==
- Krämaren, Örebro
- Marieberg Shopping Centre, Örebro
- Träffpunkt, Örebro

== Östergötland County ==
=== Linköping ===
- Filbytergallerian
- Gränden
- Leo Shopping Centre
- Tornby Shopping Centre

=== Norrköping ===
- Galleria Domino
- Hageby Centrum
- Ingelsta Shopping Centre
- Linden Shopping Centre
- Spiralen Norrköping City

=== Mjölby ===
- Depot Mantorp
