= Abborrträsk Nature Reserve =

Nature reserve in Stockholm, Sweden

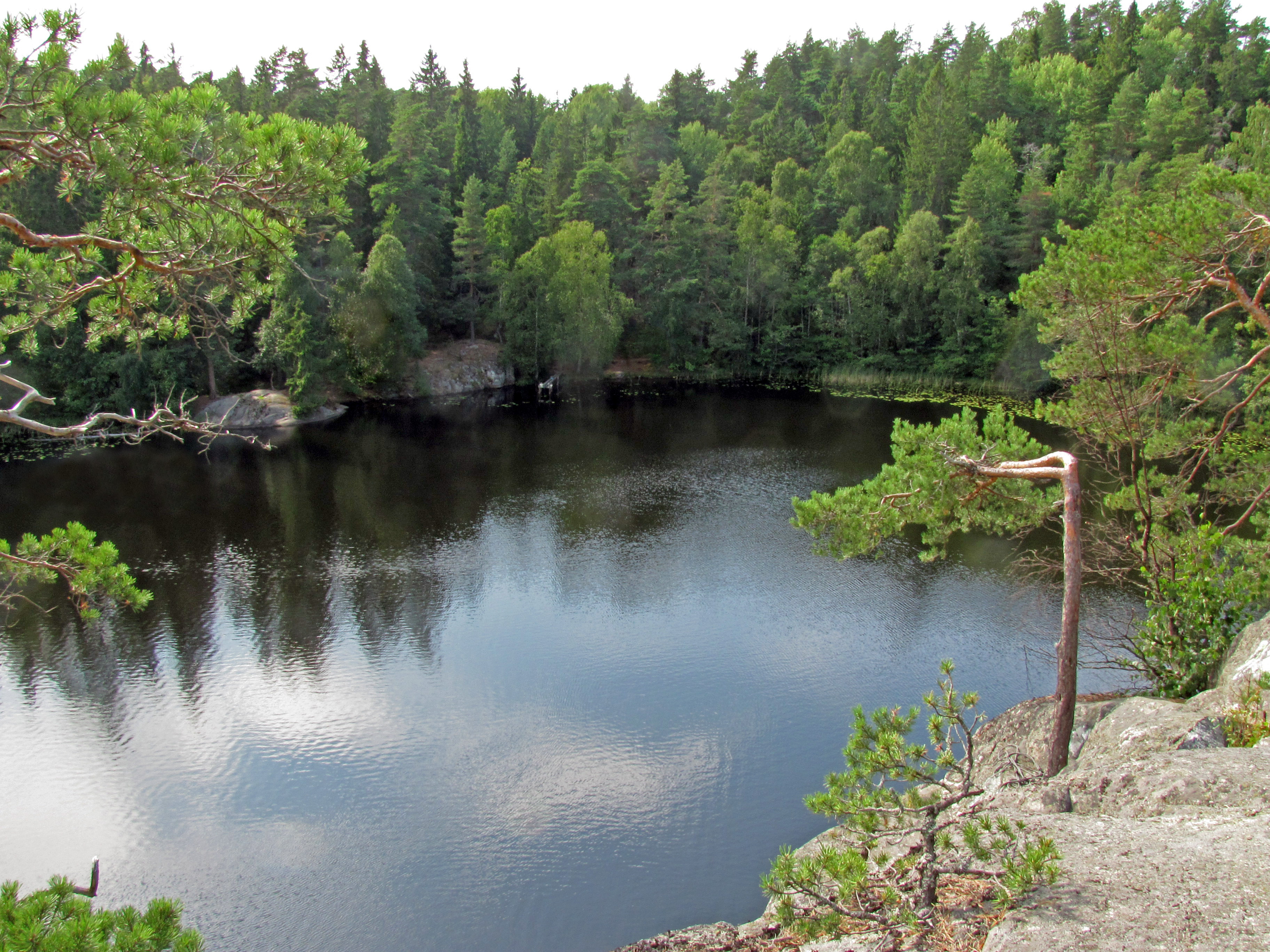

- Location within Stockholm
- Location: Sweden
- Nearest city: Nacka
- Coordinates: 59°19′54″N 18°17′16″E
- Area: 21 ha (52 acres)

Abborrträsk Nature Reserve (Swedish: Abborrträsks naturreservat) is a nature reserve in Stockholm County in Sweden.

The nature reserve protects the lake Abborrträsk and the surrounding area, which consists mainly of different types of forest.
