= Stockholm Wood City =

Wooden building complex in Stockholm, Sweden

Stockholm Wood City is a planned wooden construction project located in the Stockholm neighborhood Sickla, initiated and developed by the Swedish urban developer Atrium Ljungberg. The project will become the world's largest known wooden-built urban area, spanning 25 blocks and 250,000 square meters. It has been praised by institutions such as the World Economic Forum as a precedent in sustainable city development. The project is estimated to cost $1.4 billion.

Construction is set to break ground in 2025, with phase-wide development planned. The first buildings are expected to be completed by 2027, with the entire project slated for completion ten years from the start of construction.

When the wood city is finalized, it will house 7,000 office spaces, 2,000 homes as well as a variety of retailers and restaurants. It will be the largest workplace area in southern Stockholm, to compensate for the current deficit of workplaces in the southern half of the Stockholm region.

== Background ==
The project was conceived by the developer Atrium Ljungberg in 2023, with an aim to advance towards the listed company's sustainability targets. Compared to traditional construction methods using concrete or other materials, wooden construction offers multiple advantages. It significantly reduces carbon dioxide emissions both during the construction phase and throughout the building's maintenance life cycle. Additionally, wooden construction shortens the duration of the building process and results in less noise at construction sites.

Atrium Ljungberg has also claimed that wood buildings can be better for personal health and that studies have shown they "provide better air quality, reduce stress, increase productivity, and store carbon dioxide throughout the time they are in use."

== Development ==
The architecture of the Stockholm Wood City incorporates nature-informed elements that follow the minimalist and function aesthetics of Scandinavian design. Buildings will feature green roofs for improved insulation and large windows to maximize natural light. The Nordic architecture firms White and Henning Larsen have both worked on the early concept design development for the project.

Stockholm Wood City was announced in the wake of a global trend toward timber construction, with several countries aiming to build the tallest wooden skyscrapers. While there are other contenders in the race for height, Stockholm Wood City aspires for a different kind of record as the most expansive wooden city.
