= Westfield Täby Centrum =

Shopping mall in Täby, Stockholm, Sweden

- Location: Täby, Stockholm, Sweden
- Coordinates: 59°26′42″N 18°04′17″E
- Opened: 1968
- Manager: Unibail-Rodamco-Westfield
- Owner: Unibail-Rodamco-Westfield
- Num. of stores: 260
- Floor area: 78,000 m^{2} (840,000 sq ft)
- Floors: 3
- Parking: Approx. 4,000
- Public transit: Täby Centrum Station, commuter rail
- Website: westfield.com/sweden/tabycentrum

Westfield Täby Centrum is a shopping mall located in Täby, Stockholm, Sweden. It had 160 stores in 2014, which is expected to increase to 260 in 2015. It had approximately 10.1 million visitors in 2011, making it the fourth-biggest mall in Stockholm in terms of visitors, and second-biggest shopping centre in terms of sales, after Sickla Köpkvarter. The mall has received several awards, including "Best Swedish Shopping Centre" in 2014 and "Best Nordic Shopping Centre" in 2015 by the Nordic Council of Shopping Centers.

== History ==
Täby Centrum was inaugurated in 1968, as the first shopping centre with a glass-vaulted ceiling in the Stockholm area. In 1991, the centre expanded with a 110-metre (360 ft) shopping street three stories tall, covered by an arching glass roof. In 2002, a large-scale plan for renovating and expanding the centre was initiated by the owner, Unibail-Rodamco, in cooperation with the municipality. Carried out in multiple stages and expected to be completed in 2015, this plan would lead to an almost completely new interior, an additional 14,000 m^{2} (150,000 sq ft) of retail space, and approximately 4,000 indoor parking spaces.

== Notable tenants ==
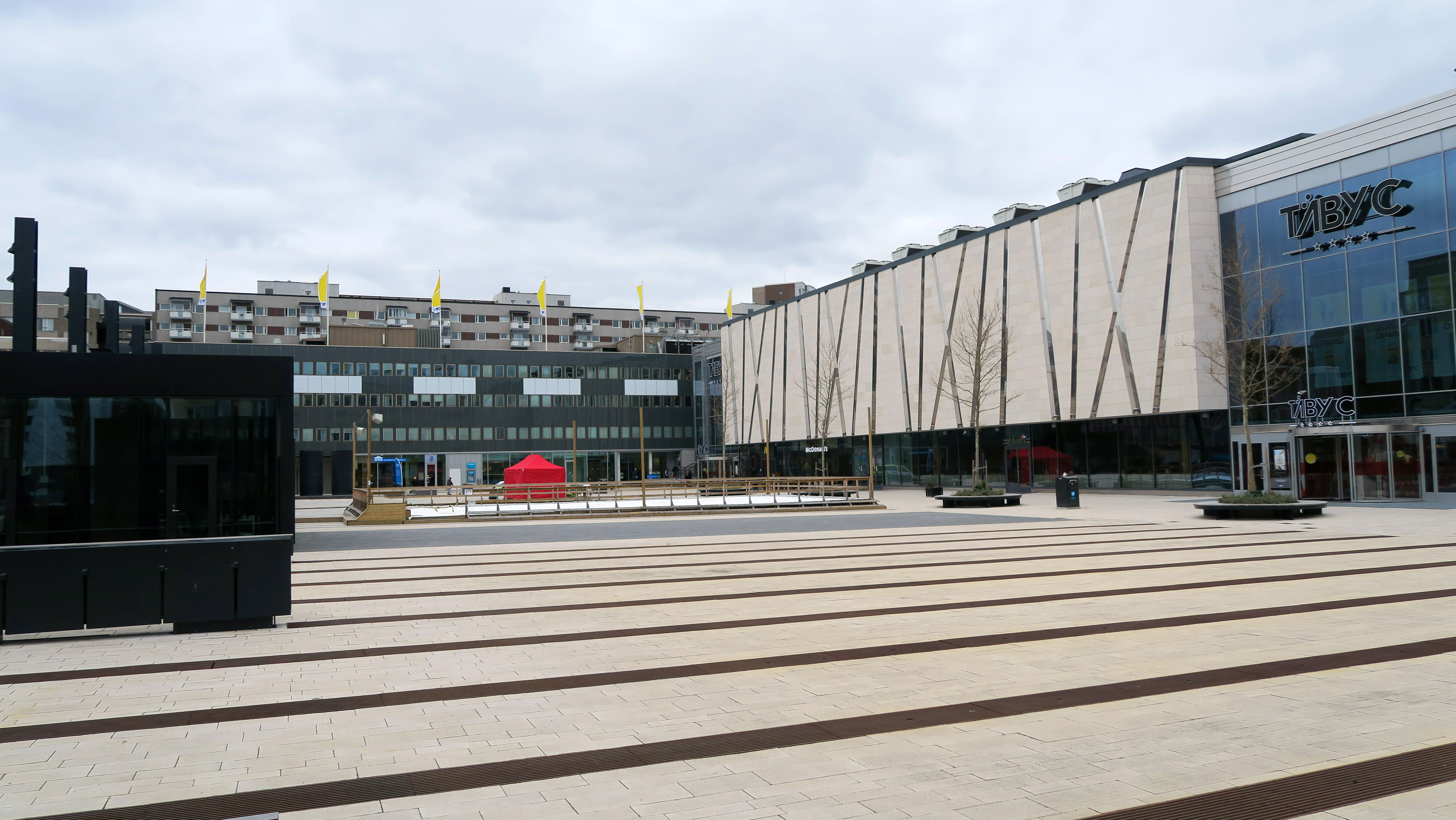
- The Täby Centrum square in 2017.
  First permanent Tesla Motors store established in a shopping mall in northern Europe, April 2014
- First Sephora (2012) and Ladurée (2013) to open in Sweden
- First official Apple Store to open in the Nordic region, in September 2012

== See also ==
- List of shopping centres in Sweden
