= Sickla kanalbro =

Bridge in central Stockholm, Sweden

Coordinates: 59.30229°N 18.11030°E

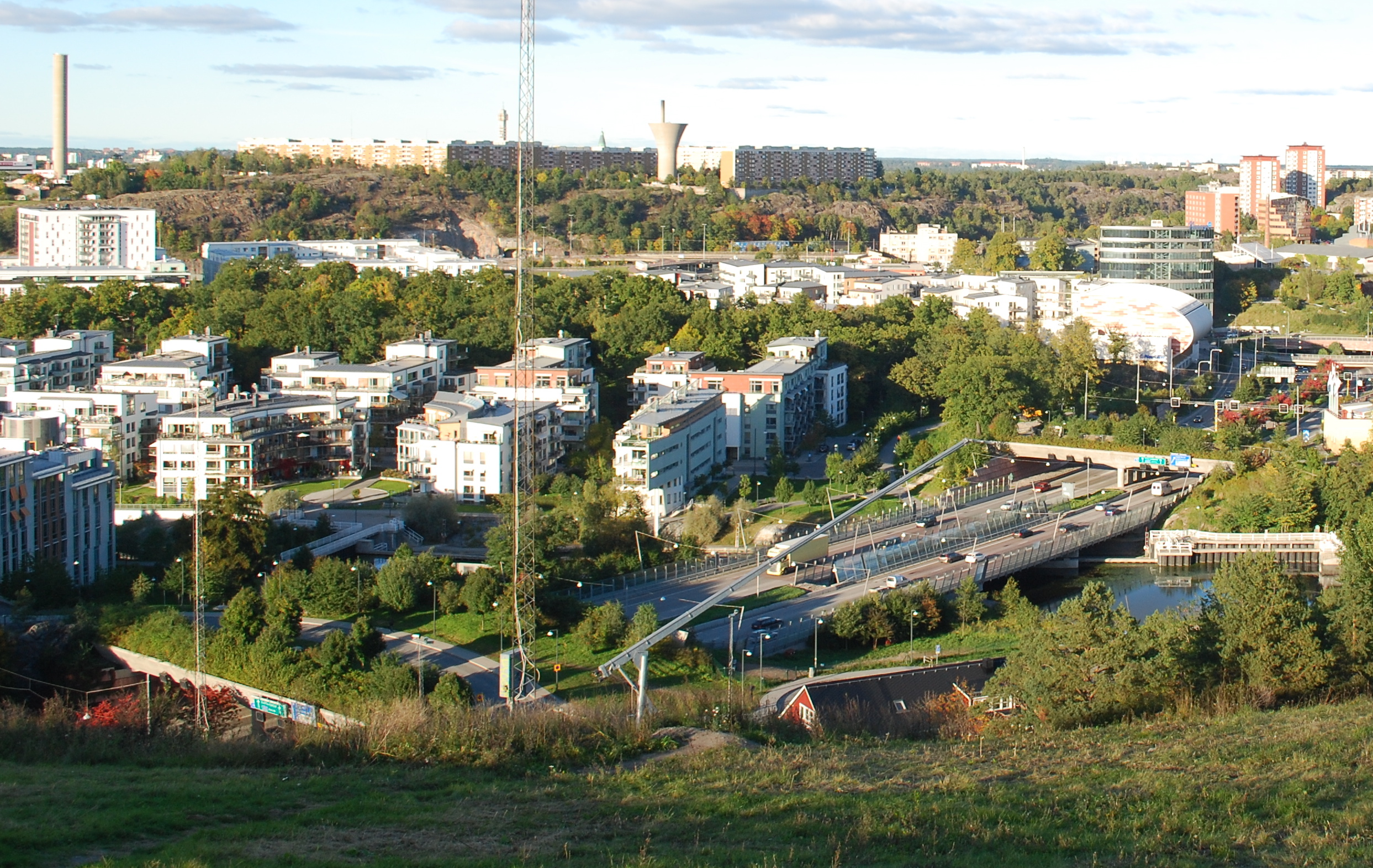
Sickla kanalbro

Sickla kanalbro (Swedish: "Sickla Canal Bridge") is a bridge in central Stockholm, Sweden. Stretching over Sickla kanal ("Canal of Sickla"), it connects Södra Hammarbyhamnen to Nacka. The name Sickla is believed to be derived from a 15th-century provincial word, sik, meaning "minor marsh".

A product of post-WW2 traffic loads, the bridge was built 1954-1955 as a continuous steel girder bridge resting on four supports and carrying a concrete roadway. 60 metres long and 10,3 metres wide, the bridge passes over three spans with a maximum span of 23 metres and an average horizontal clearance over the canal of 4,6 metres. The supports are built on a foundation of concrete poles, while the abutments are resting directly on the bedrock. The bridge was originally built with a future widening in mind, something which had to wait until 1979 when a 2,6 metres wide cantilevering pathway was added on the south side of the roadway.

== See also ==
- List of bridges in Stockholm
- Danviksbron
- Sicklauddsbron
- Sickla sluss
