= Sicklauddsbron =

Footbridge in Stockholm, Sweden

Coordinates: 59°18′17.58″N 18°6′9.37″E

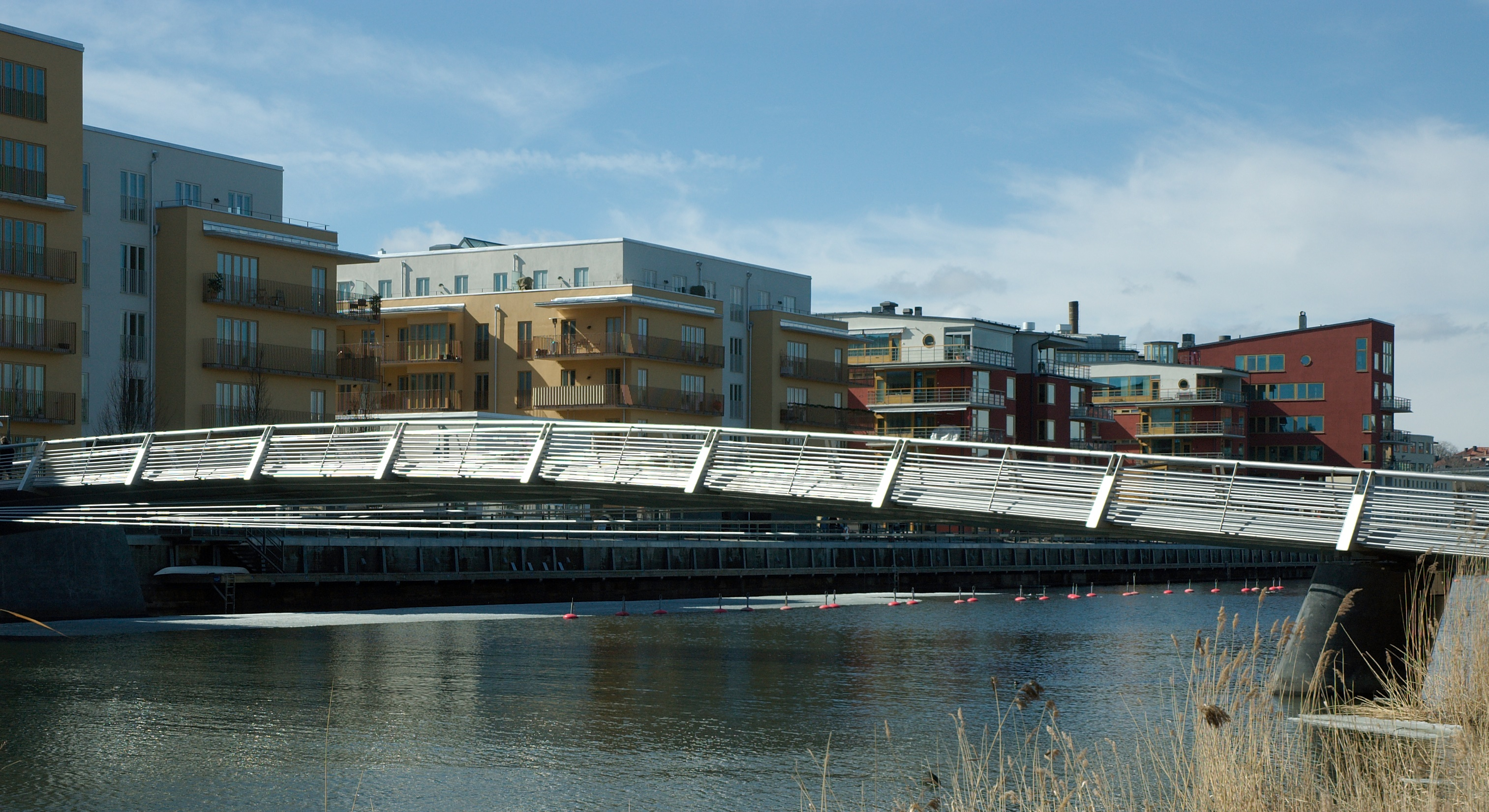
Sicklauddsbron in April 2006.

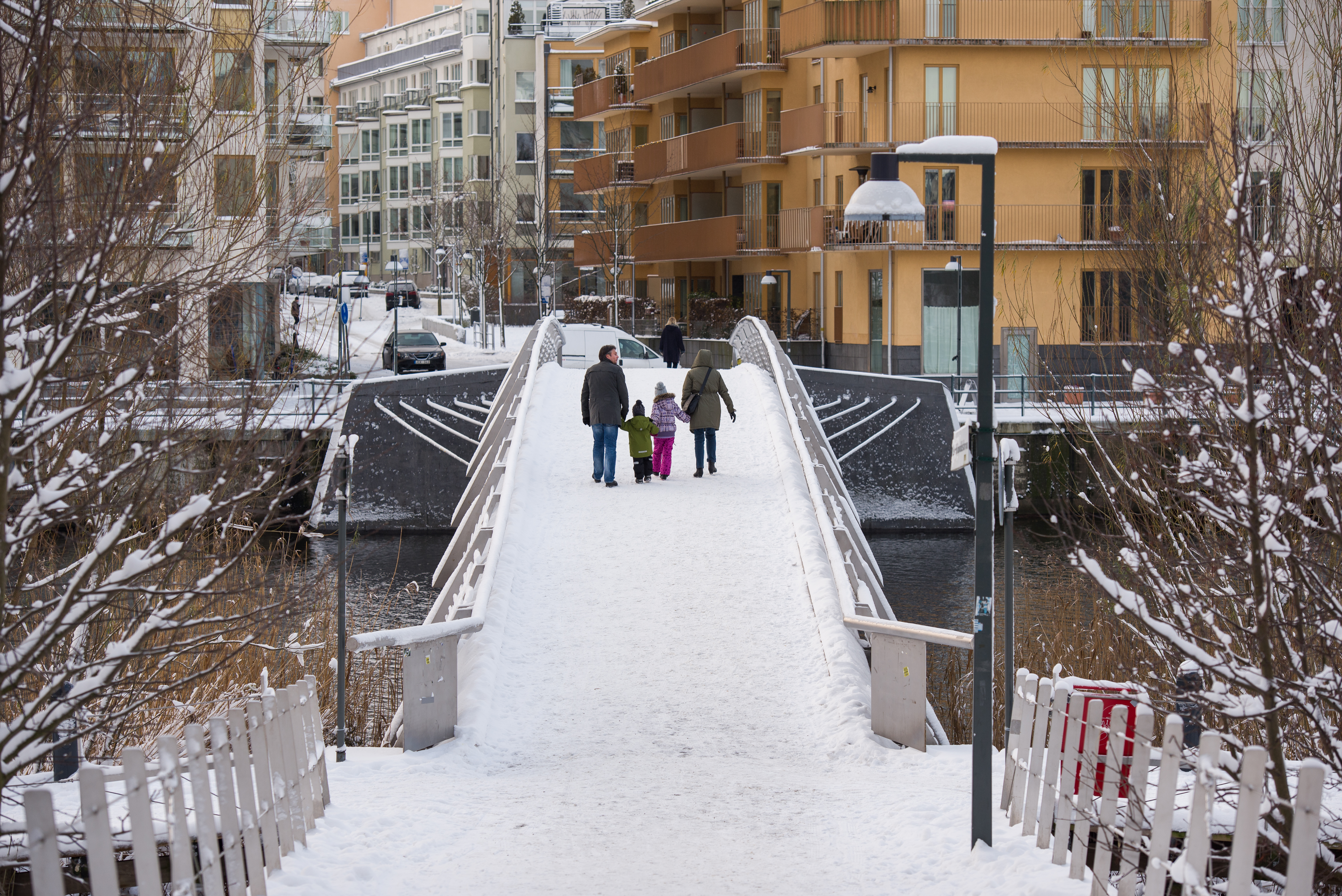
Sicklauddsbron in December 2012.

Sicklauddsbron (Swedish: "The Bridge of Cape Sickla") or Apatêbron ("Bridge Apatê") is a bridge in central Stockholm, Sweden. It stretches over Sickla kanal in Södra Hammarbyhamnen. The name Sickla is believed to be derived from a 15th-century provincial word, sik, meaning "minor marsh". The bridge is named Apatê, a Greek word meaning mirage or illusion. Designed by the architects Magnus Ståhl, Erik Andersson (architect), and Jelena Mijanovic, it was awarded the European Steel Design Award in 2003.

Sicklauddsbron is a stainless steel pedestrian bridge, 62 metres in length. The load-bearing sections are made of 80 tonnes hot-rolled duplex stainless steel gauge plates, 25 mm thick, which were water cut, flanged, and welded before being reassembled on the site. From the concrete abutments tension cables stretches the central part of the bridge, an arched box girder triangular in section. The lighting is built-in into the stainless steel handrails, while the pathway is covered with asphalt.

== See also ==
- List of bridges in Stockholm
- Danviksbron
- Sickla kanalbro
