= Sickla station =

Railway station in Nacka, Sweden

Sickla
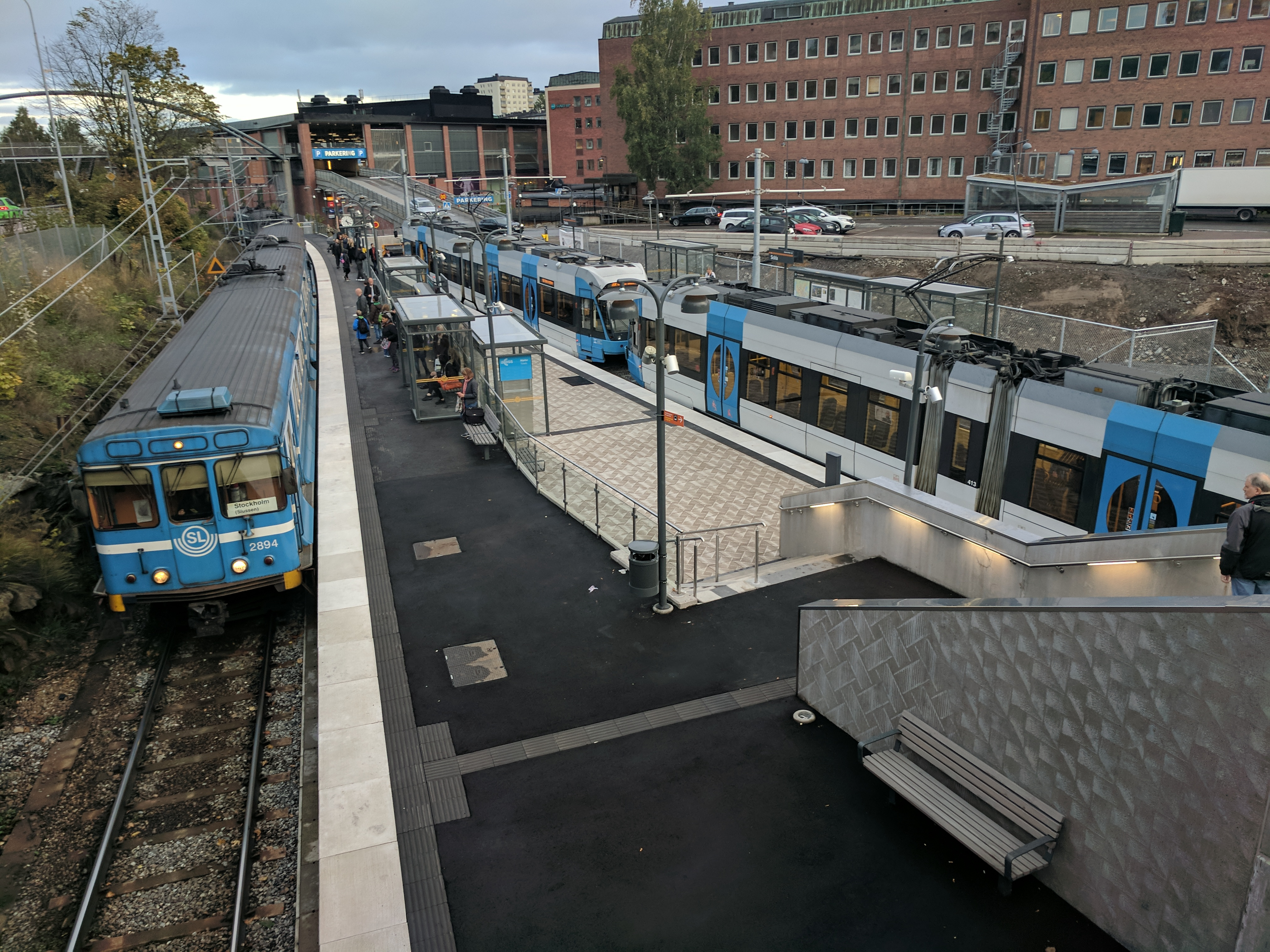

General information
- System: Saltsjöbanan, Tvärbanan; Stockholm Metro (Future)
- Owner: Storstockholms Lokaltrafik
- Platforms: 2
- Tracks: 3

Construction
- Structure type: At-grade
- Accessible: Yes

History
- Opened: 1894; 132 years ago (Saltsjöbanan); 2017; 9 years ago (Tvärbanan)
- Opening: 2030; 4 years' time (Metro)

Services
Preceding station	SL Local & Light Rail	Following station
Henriksdal towards Slussen	Saltsjöbanan Line 25	Nacka towards Saltsjöbaden
Sickla udde towards Solna station	Tvärbanan Line 30	Terminus
Location

Sickla station is a railway station and future metro station located in the Sickla area of Nacka Municipality in Stockholm County. Located approximately 3.3 kilometers from Slussen, it serves as an interchange between the Saltsjöbanan railway, the Tvärbanan light rail, will also serve the Blue Line of the Stockholm Metro from 2030. The station is situated at the western end of the Sickla Köpkvarter shopping area.

== History ==
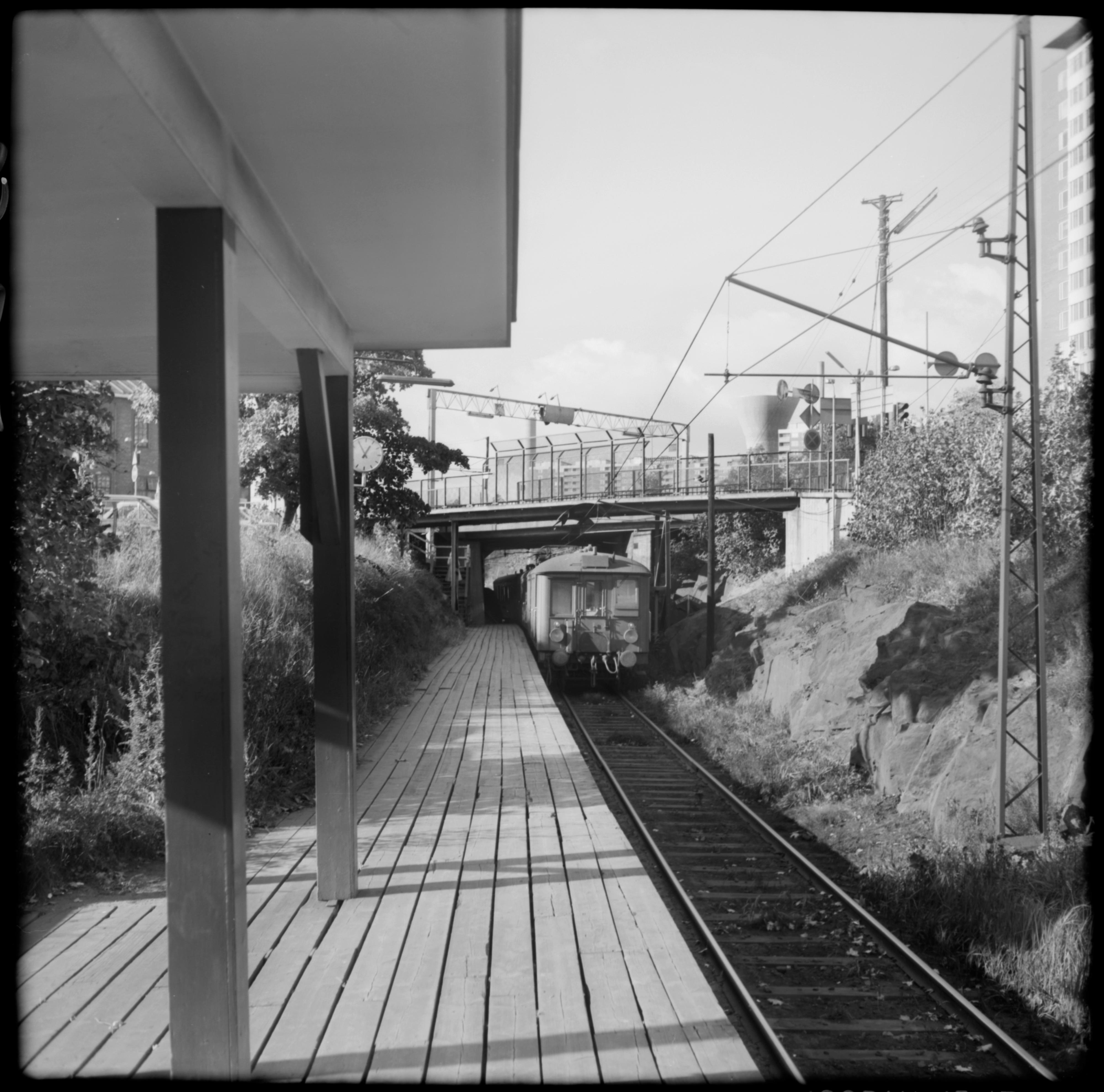
The former wooden platform

Sickla has had a station on the Saltsjöbanan railway since 1 April 1894, which was initially known as Sickla Djurgård. On 15 May 1898, the station's name was shortened to Sickla. The Saltsjöbanan station operates on a single track and features a concrete platform, which is integrated with the platforms for the Tvärbanan.

The station underwent redevelopment between 2015 and 2017 as part of an extension of the Tvärbanan light rail from Hammarby Sjöstad. This extension, completed in October 2017, made Sickla the new southeastern terminus of the Tvärbanan, with the new platforms running parallel to the Saltsjöbanan platform, which was rebuilt from wood to concrete.

Since January 2023, all Saltsjöbanan train services have been suspended as part of ongoing upgrades to the line. Additionally, Sickla's Tvärbanan light rail stop has been temporarily relocated to Uddvägen, approximately 400 metres from the original station. This arrangement is expected to remain in place until 2025, to accommodate construction work, including the development of an entrance for the future Sickla metro station.

== Metro Station ==
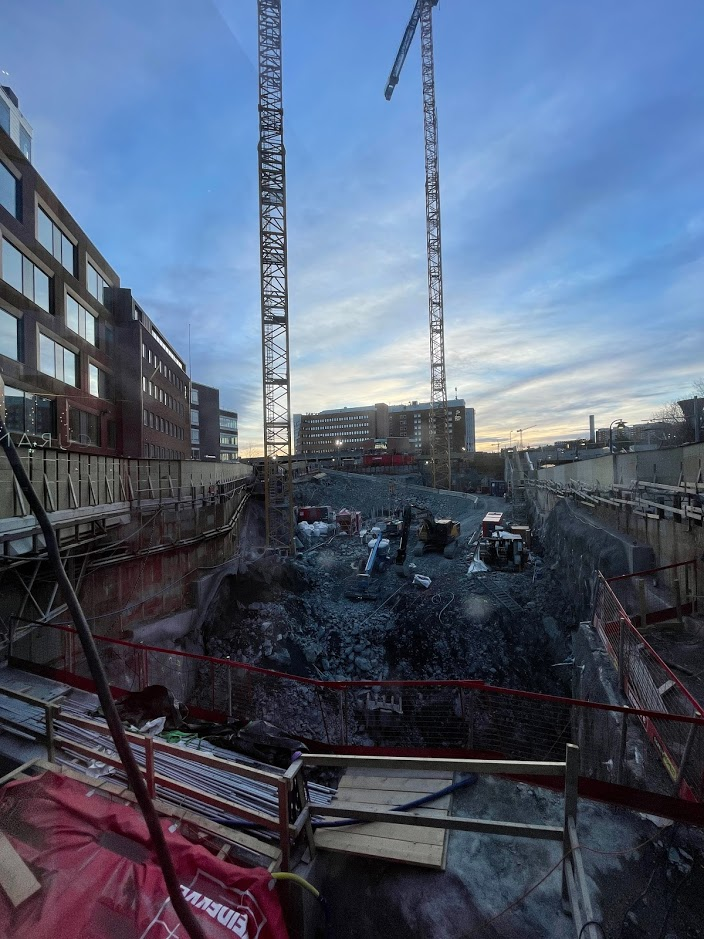
Sickla metro station entrance under construction in 2021

Sickla metro station will be part of the Blue Line extension between Kungsträdgården and Nacka. Construction of the metro station began in early 2020 and is projected to last ten years.

Initial work focused on blasting and tunnelling for the station and connecting tunnels. The station, located 35 meters below ground, will require concrete work and reinforcement, alongside the installation of electrical systems and safety measures. Testing and commissioning are planned for 2028 to 2030, with the station expected to open for passenger use in 2030.

The metro station will feature four entrances. Two of these entrances will be situated in a new building at the intersection of Värmdövägen and Sickla Industriväg, adjacent to the Saltsjöbanan and Tvärbanan. A third entrance will be located at the intersection of Alphyddevägen and Värmdövägen, while the fourth entrance will be within Sickla Köpkvarter. The station will include escalators and lifts for access down to the platforms. The estimated travel time to T-Centralen is approximately 8 minutes. Artist Anna Lerinder is responsible for the artistic design of the station.

== See also ==
- Blue Line (Stockholm Metro)
