= Alatalo =

Alatalo is a Finnish surname. Notable people with the surname include:

- Mika Alatalo (born 1971), Finnish ice hockey player
- Mikko Alatalo (born 1951), Finnish musician and politician
- Santeri Alatalo (born 1990), Finnish ice hockey player
- Toimi Alatalo (1929–2014), Finnish cross-country skier
- William Alatalo (born 2002), Finnish racing driver
