= Abborrträsk =

Lake in Sweden

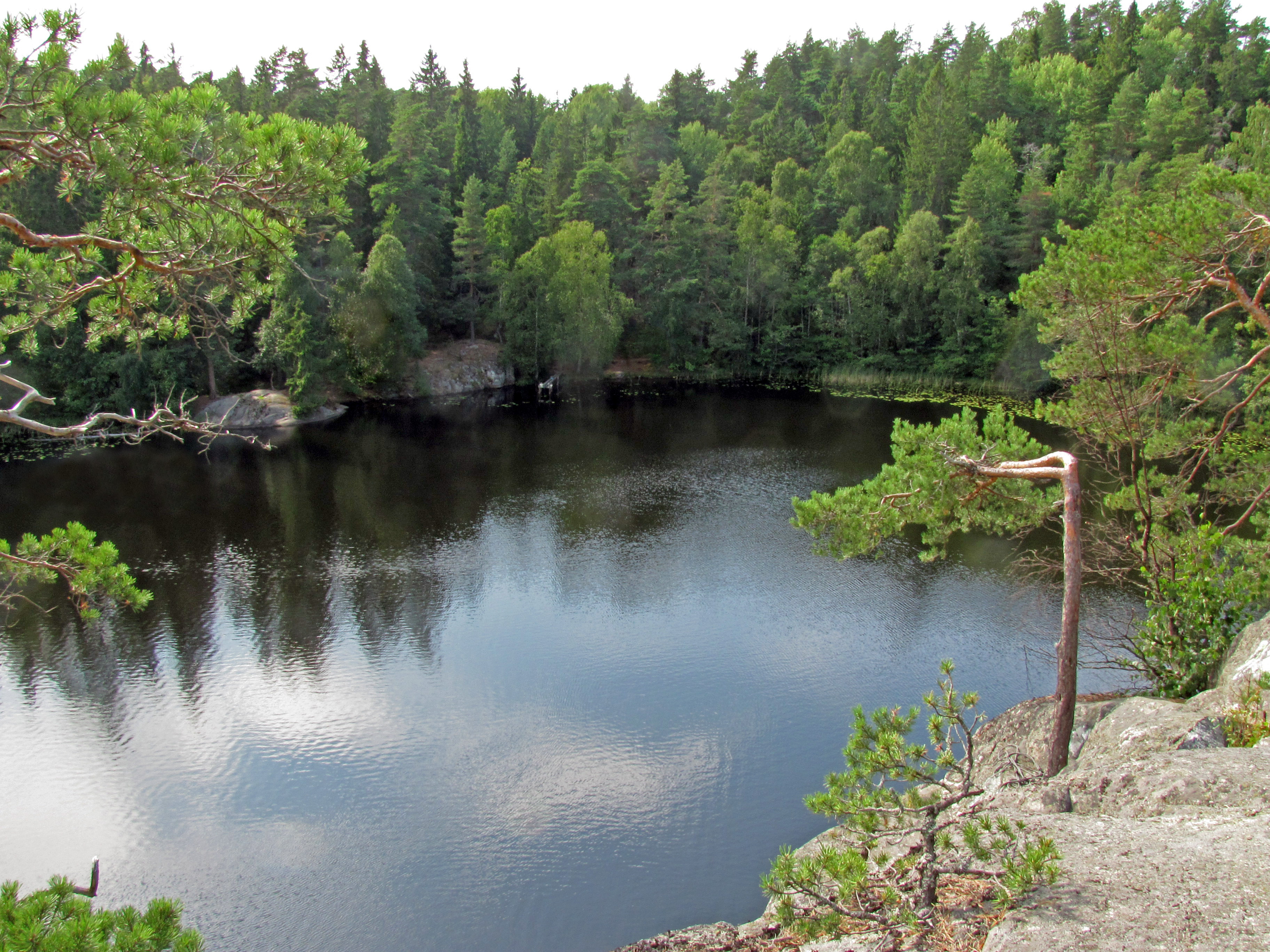

- Location within Stockholm
- Coordinates: 59°19′54″N 18°17′16″E
- Surface area: 1.8 hectares (4.4 acres)
- Max. depth: 5.3 metres (17 ft)
- Water volume: 59,000 cubic metres (2,100,000 cu ft)

Abborrträsk is a small lake in Stockholm County, Sweden. It lies within the Abborrträsk Nature Reserve.

The lake is surrounded by steep rock walls, but there is access to the water at the southern end. Bathing in the lake is possible although there is no official bathing place. Fishing in the lake with a line or rod is permitted and does not require a permit.
