= Västermalmsgallerian =

Shopping center in Stockholm, Sweden

Coordinates: 59°20′4.65″N 18°1′56.12″E

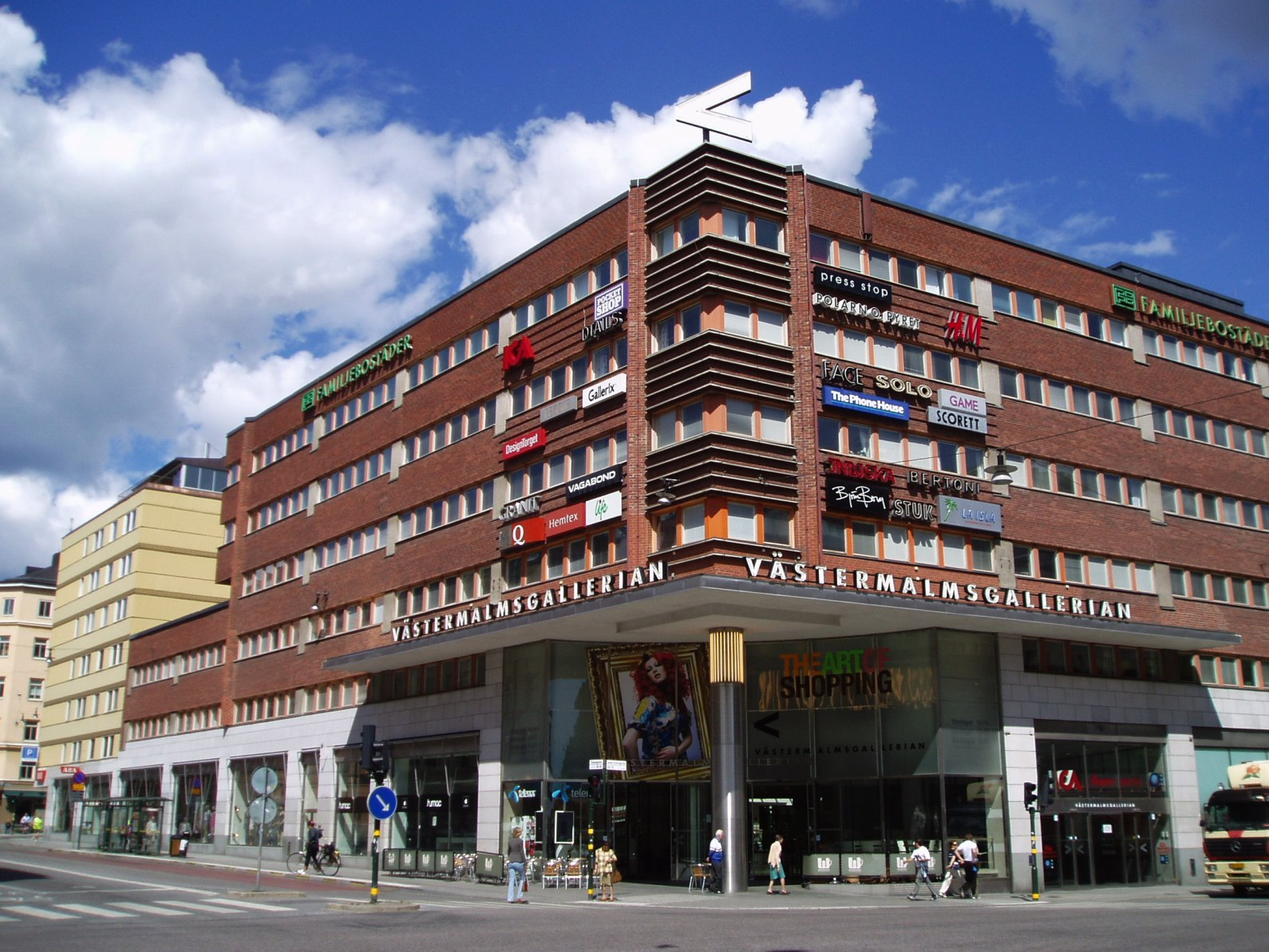
Västermalmsgallerian

Västermalmsgallerian is a shopping centre in Kungsholmen, Stockholm, Sweden, inaugurated on 23 August 2002.

The shopping centre is located in a renovated building dating from the 1970s in the city block "Trossen" near the Fridhemsplan metro station at the intersection of the Sankt Eriksgatan and Fleminggatan streets.

The name Västermalmsgallerian comes from Västermalm, an alternative name for the district of Kungsholmen. The shopping centre is the first shopping centre in Kungsholmen, including shops for fashion, interior decoration and food. It has a total area of 10'000 m^{2}, and includes 45 shops of various sizes and international retail chains.

The shopping centre was owned by Centrumkompaniet, a daughter company of the municipal Familjebostäder, until 2007. In 2007 the city of Stockholm decided to sell the whole shopping centre to the British housing company Boultbee. In December 2011 AMF Fastigheter bought the shopping centre.

== See also ==
- List of shopping centres in Sweden
