= Frölunda Torg =

- Location: Gothenburg, Sweden
- Coordinates: 57°39′07″N 11°54′42″E
- Opened: 8 September 1966
- Manager: Skandia
- Owner: Diligenta
- Architect: Klemming & Thelaus (1966); White, and Thorbjörnsson & Edgren (2007)
- Num. of stores: 140 (2007); 200 (2011)
- Floor area: 68,000 m^{2} (730,000 sq ft) (2007); 75,000 m^{2} (810,000 sq ft) (2011)
- Floors: 3
- Parking: 3,000
- Website: frolundatorg.se

Frölunda Torg is a shopping centre in Gothenburg, Sweden. It is one of the largest shopping centres in Scandinavia, with approximately 200 shops and more than 10 million visitors in 2009. The shopping centre's total area is about 75,000 square metres. The companies housed in Frölunda Torg employ in total 1,500 people and their total annual turnover is in excess of 1.6 billion kronor.

== History ==
Frölunda Torg was inaugurated on 8 September 1966 by Olof Palme as, at the time, Europe's largest shopping centre. The construction had cost SEK 80 million and took eight years to complete.

An expansion of the mall was finished in 1980, which resulted in an additional 13,300 m^{2} and 14 new stores, as well as a restaurant. The mall was further expanded the following years, with new sections opened in 1984 and 1995.

In 2007, the owner Diligenta, was granted building permit for a large renovation and expanding process. The renovation started on 26 October 2007 and the first stage was completed in 2010. The second stage was started in the spring of 2010 and was finished in 2011, after which centre hosts a total of 200 stores in 75,000 m^{2}.

== Location and transportation ==
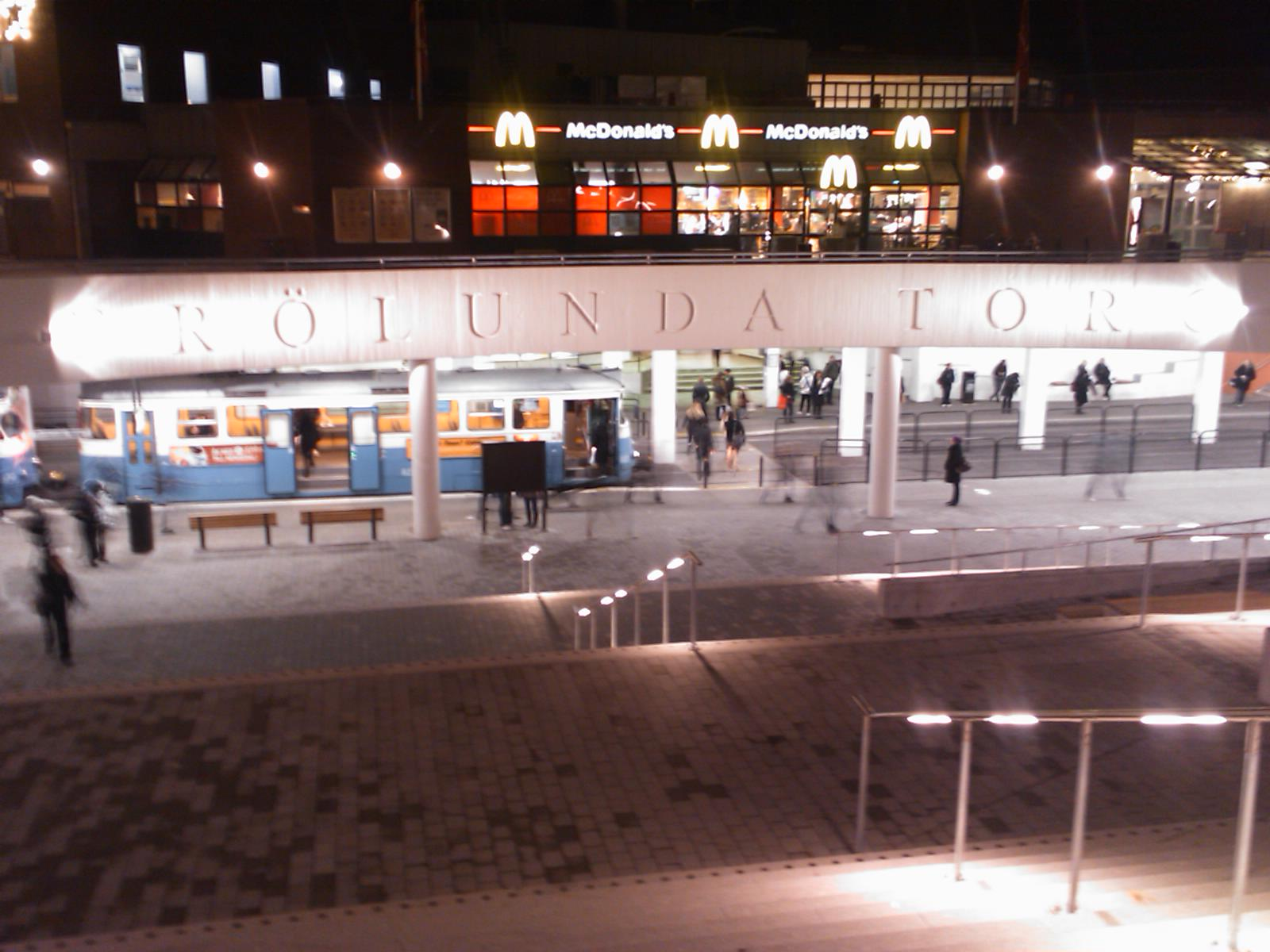
The new tram-station, opened in 2008.

Frölunda Torg is located in west Gothenburg, in Frölunda. The shopping centre also offers parking space to 3000 cars in three parking lots and two parking-decks. Just outside there is a major bus-pit and a tram station with a tram arriving every three minutes. The tram station is accessed with tram lines 1, 7 and 8, with a travel time from the inner city is about 20 minutes. This makes it easy to reach by public transportation, even if many of the visitors use car.

== In popular culture ==
Frölunda Torg is mentioned in the song by the same name by local band ior, released as a single in 2024.

== See also ==
- List of shopping centres in Sweden
