= Atrium Ljungberg =

Swedish urban development company

Atrium Ljungberg is one of the largest urban development companies in Sweden. The company primarily operates in Sweden’s major cities and is listed on the large cap list of the NASDAQ OMX Nordic exchange. Annica Ånäs is the CEO of the company, and Johan Ljungberg, head of one of the families holding significant stakes in the company, is chairman.

Some of Atrium Ljungberg’s more renowned development projects are the Stockholm Wood City, Slussen and Slakthusområdet (the Stockholm Meatpacking District) in Stockholm. About two thirds of its properties are office spaces. The company is also a co-owner of the Stockholm-based company A house, a coworking property development company specializing in creating creative environments.

== History ==
Atrium Ljungberg was established in 2007 following the merger of the previously existing LjungbergGruppen and Atrium Fastigheter. LjungbergGruppen traces its origins back to the construction and real estate business that builder Tage Ljungberg initiated in 1946. The company was listed on NASDAQ OMX Stockholm in 1994.

Atrium Ljungberg owns, develops, and manages properties encompassing over 1,000,000 square meters of leasable area, with a property value of approximately 60 billion kronor. Their focus is on the development of attractive urban environments with a diverse mix of office spaces, residences, and retail blended with culture, services, and education. The majority of their properties are office spaces in the Stockholm area.

In 2018, Atrium Ljungberg was selected by the City of Stockholm as the lead developer for the Slakthusområdet region in southern Stockholm.

In 2023, the company announced the development of Stockholm Wood City. The planned wooden construction project located in the Stockholm neighborhood Sickla, will become the world’s largest known wooden-built urban area, spanning 25 blocks and 250,000 square meters. It has been praised by institutions such as the World Economic Forum as a precedent in sustainable city development.

Industrial properties are a particular specialty for Atrium Ljungberg, as evidenced by their developments in Sickla, Nacka, and the Slakthusområdet area of Stockholm.
