= Duvan =

Duvan Дуван
- Selo
- Location within Bashkortostan Location within Russia
- Coordinates: 55°41′N 57°54′E
- Country: Russia
- Region: Bashkortostan
- District: Duvansky District
- Time zone: UTC+5:00

Duvan (Russian: Дуван; Bashkir: Дыуан, Dıwan) is a rural locality (a selo) and the administrative centre of Duvansky Selsoviet, Duvansky District, Bashkortostan, Russia. The population was 3,669 as of 2010. There are 44 streets.

== Geography ==
Duvan is located 30 km northwest of Mesyagutovo (the district's administrative centre) by road. Ulkundy is the nearest rural locality.
