= Sickla Köpkvarter =

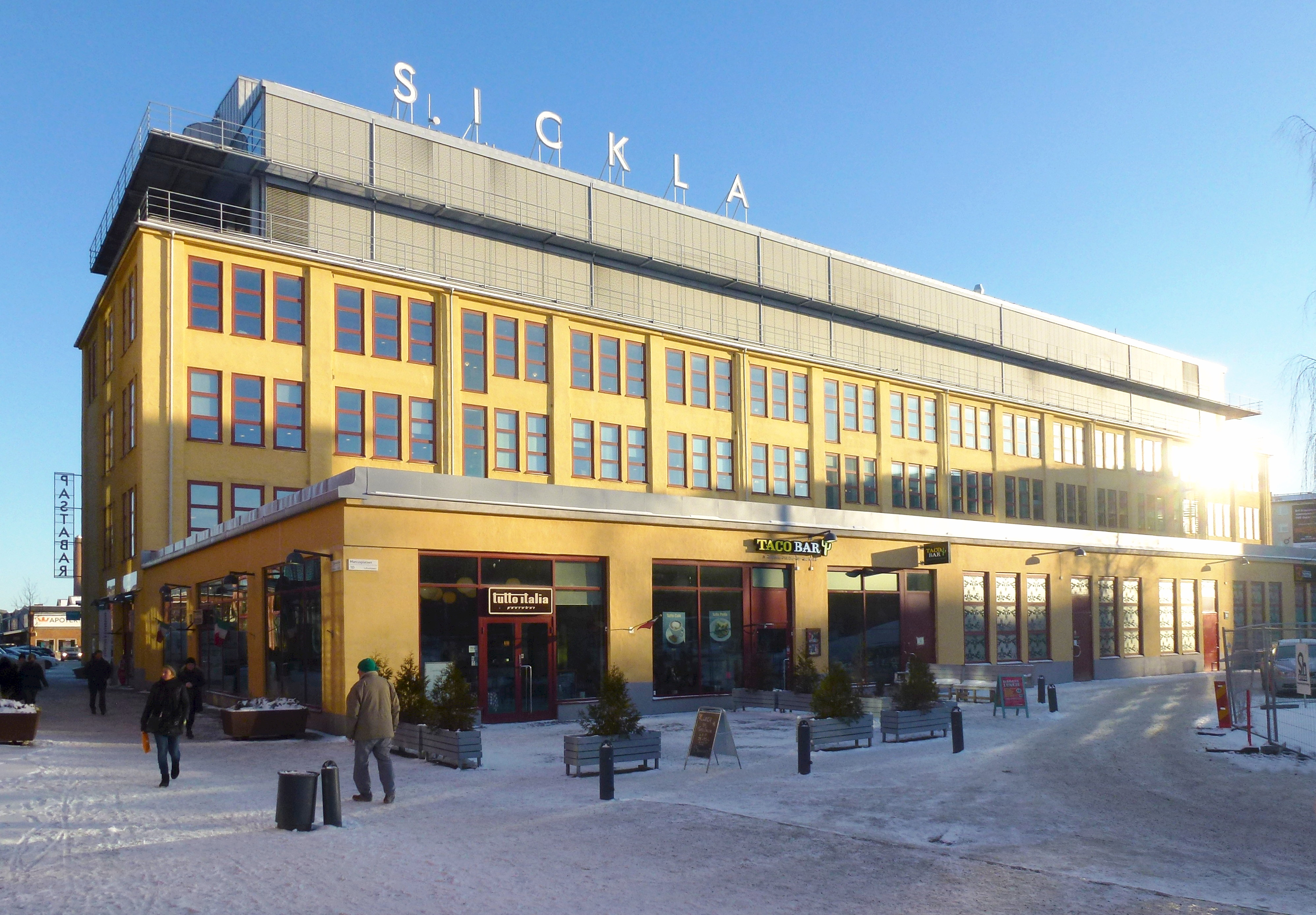
- Sickla Köpkvarter, 2014
- Location: Nacka, Sweden
- Coordinates: 59°18′21.7″N 18°07′32.8″E
- Opened: 1994, 2005
- Owner: Atrium Ljungberg
- Num. of stores: 168
- Floor area: 78,700 m^{2} (847,000 sq ft)
- Parking: 2,600
- Public transit: Sickla Station or Nacka Station, Saltsjöbanan
- Website: kopkvarter.sickla.se

Sickla Köpkvarter is a retail park and shopping district located on a redeveloped industrial estate in Nacka, Sweden. It's wholly owned by Atrium Ljungberg — a real estate company headquartered in the area — and consists of several shopping malls in varying sizes, in addition to office buildings with shops at street level and a civic center housing a museum, art gallery, library and multiplex. In 2013, the shopping center had 2,600 parking spaces, a total of 168 stores with a combined retail floor area of 78,700 m^{2} (847,000 sq ft) and annual turnover of SEK 3 billion. The biggest stores are ICA, Elgiganten, Willys and Best of Brands, accounting for nearly a quarter of the annual rent payments. It's one of the biggest shopping centers in Stockholm in terms of sales.

== History ==
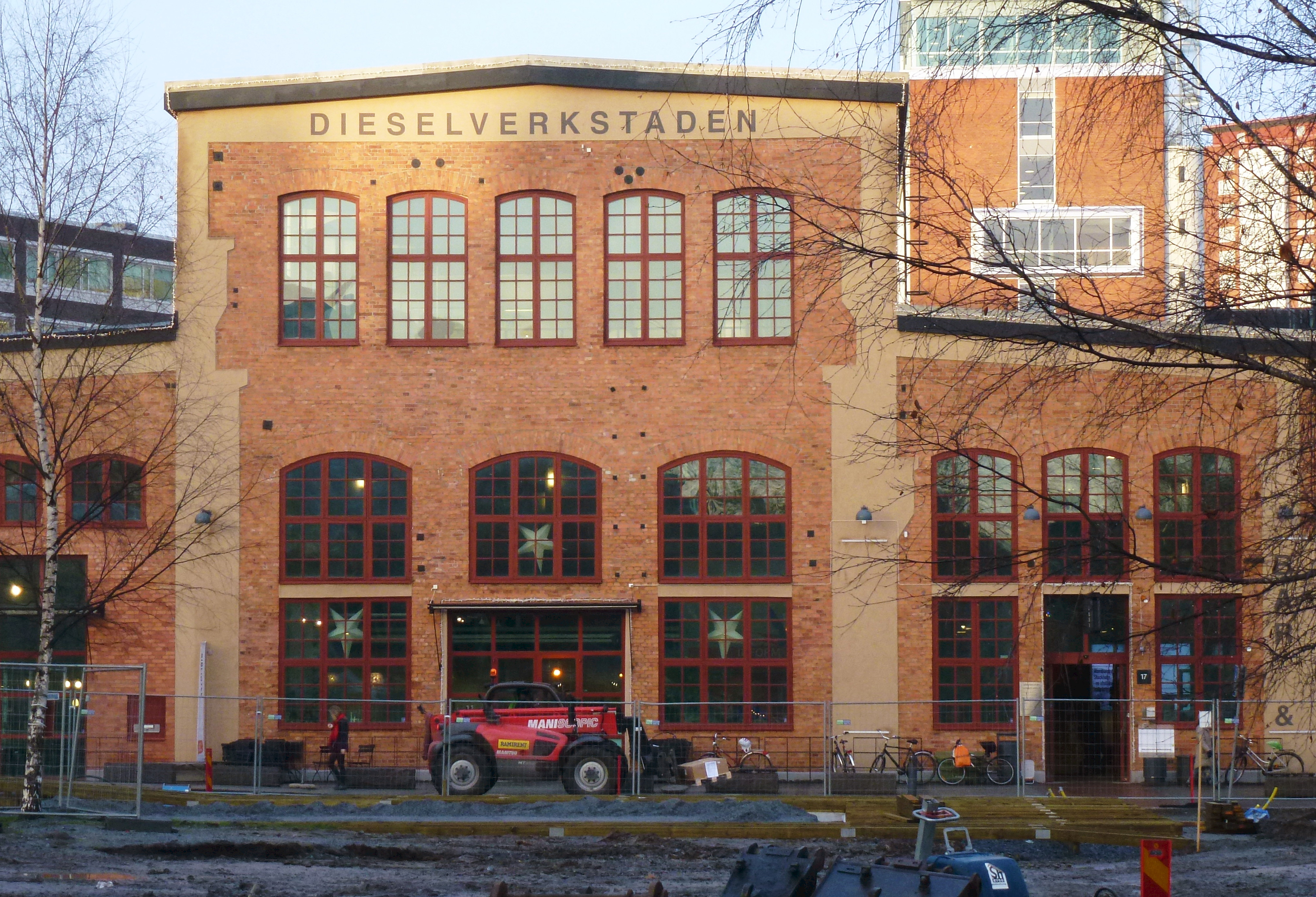
Dieselverkstaden—Old factory turned into civic center

Sickla is an area on the western part of the peninsula Sicklaön, in the municipalities of Nacka and Stockholm. The toponym is said to be derived from Old Swedish, meaning "boggy ground, from which water emerges." The area north of lake Sicklasjön, today known as Sickla Köpkvarter, was previously an industrial estate, established in connection with the Saltsjöbanan railway expansion in the early 1890s. Two companies were active in this part of Sickla, and would later merge to form the global industrial group Atlas Copco; with its factories remaining active on site until the late 1980s.

In 1994, Nacka Municipality rezoned the old factory premises and turned the area into a retail park, in cooperation with a wholly owned subsidiary of Atlas Copco. Real estate company Atrium Ljungberg acquired the property three years later, and began working on reshaping the area into a modern shopping destination. This led to the construction of a new mall, Sickla Galleria, which was inaugurated in 2005. Atrium Ljungberg have continued to develop and manage the area since then, adding more office space and shopping malls.

== See also ==
- List of shopping centres in Sweden
- Stockholm County Museum
