= Nacka =

- Nacka kommun
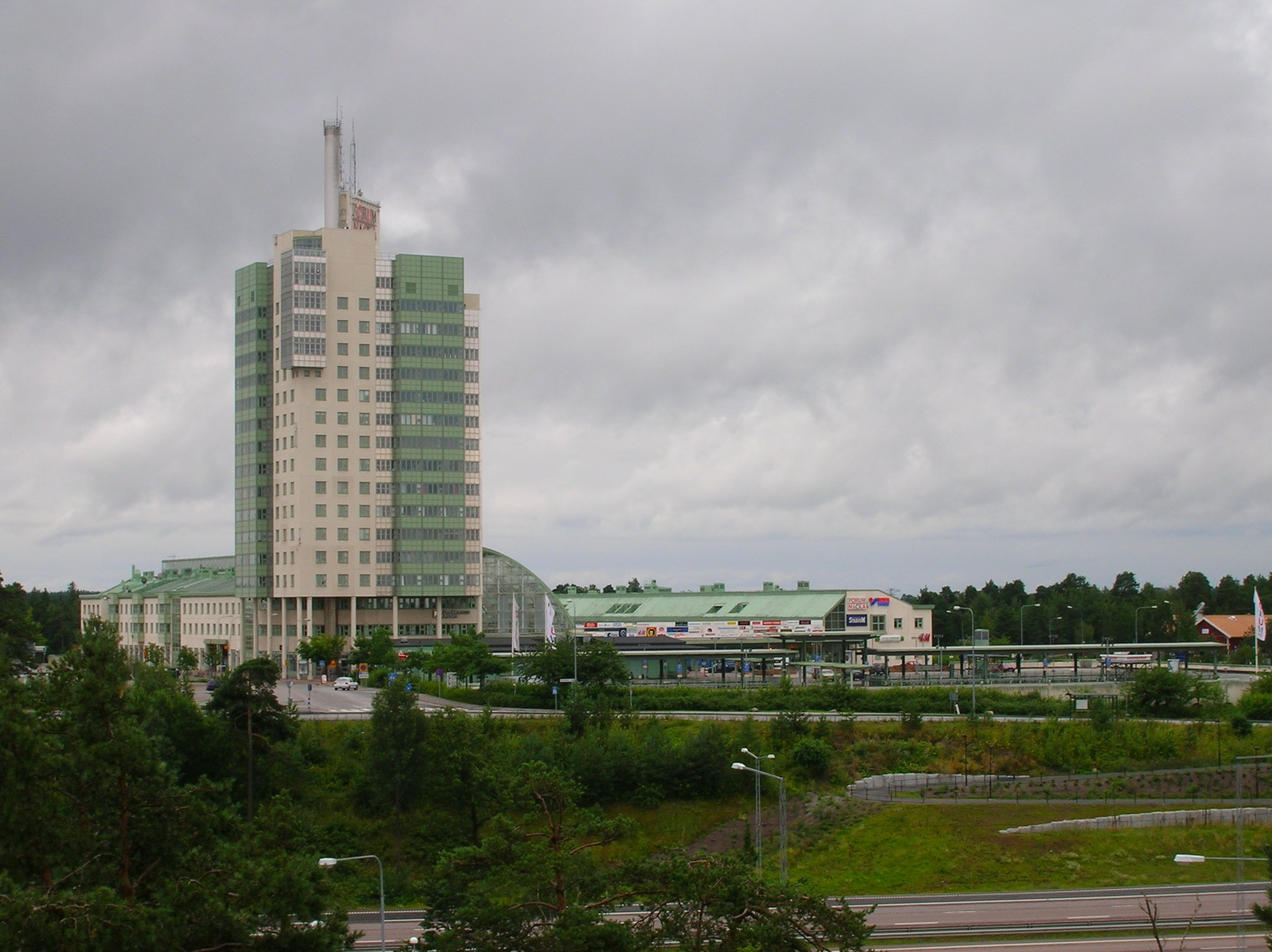
- Nacka Forum

- Location in Sweden Nacka (Sweden)
- Coordinates: 59°18′36″N 18°9′50″E
- Country: Sweden
- Province: Stockholm
- County: Stockholms Län
- Municipality: Nacka Municipality
- Time zone: UTC+1 (CET)
  - Summer (DST): UTC+2 (CEST)
- Website: www.nacka.se/

Nacka (Swedish pronunciation: [ˈnâkːa]) is the municipal seat of Nacka Municipality and part of Stockholm urban area in Sweden. The municipality's name harks back to a 16th-century industrial operation established by the Crown at Nacka farmstead where conditions for water mills are good. However, and somewhat confusingly, that spot is not densely populated today and the municipal seat is on land that once belonged to Järla farmstead on the other side of Lake Järla.

== Events ==
On 9 December 2014, Stockholm police raided a data center in a former bomb shelter under a hill in Nacka municipality. Although it was rumored the raid targeted a popular torrent site The Pirate Bay officials from The Pirate Bay have revealed that this is false.

== See also ==
- Sickla Köpkvarter – a retail park and shopping district in Nacka
- Greenwich, CT - the town's sister city
- Torsten Lord, Olympian, born in Nacka
