= Signum Priset =

Signumpriset (The Signum Award) is a trademark prize awarded to the Nordic company that best manages and foster their brand. The award was instituted in 1995 (30 years ago) by IP law firm Groth & Co.

== Previous winners ==
- 2020 Almedalsveckan
- 2019 Polarn O. Pyret
- 2018 HSB
- 2017 Pippi Långstrump
- 2016 Svenskt Tenn
- 2015 Lantmännen
- 2014 Icehotel
- 2013 Hästens
- 2012 Gröna Lund
- 2011 Indiska
- 2010 Findus
- 2009 Fjällräven
- 2008 Marimekko
- 2007 Löfbergs
- 2006 ICA AB
- 2005 Tetra Pak
- 2004 Svenska Dagbladet
- 2003 Absolut Vodka
- 2002 Atlas Copco
- 2001 ITT Flygt AB
- 2000 Carlsberg
- 1999 Bang & Olufsen
- 1998 Statoil
- 1997 AGA AB
- 1996 Ramlösa
- 1995 Volvo
