= Sara Szyber =

Swedish interior and furniture designer

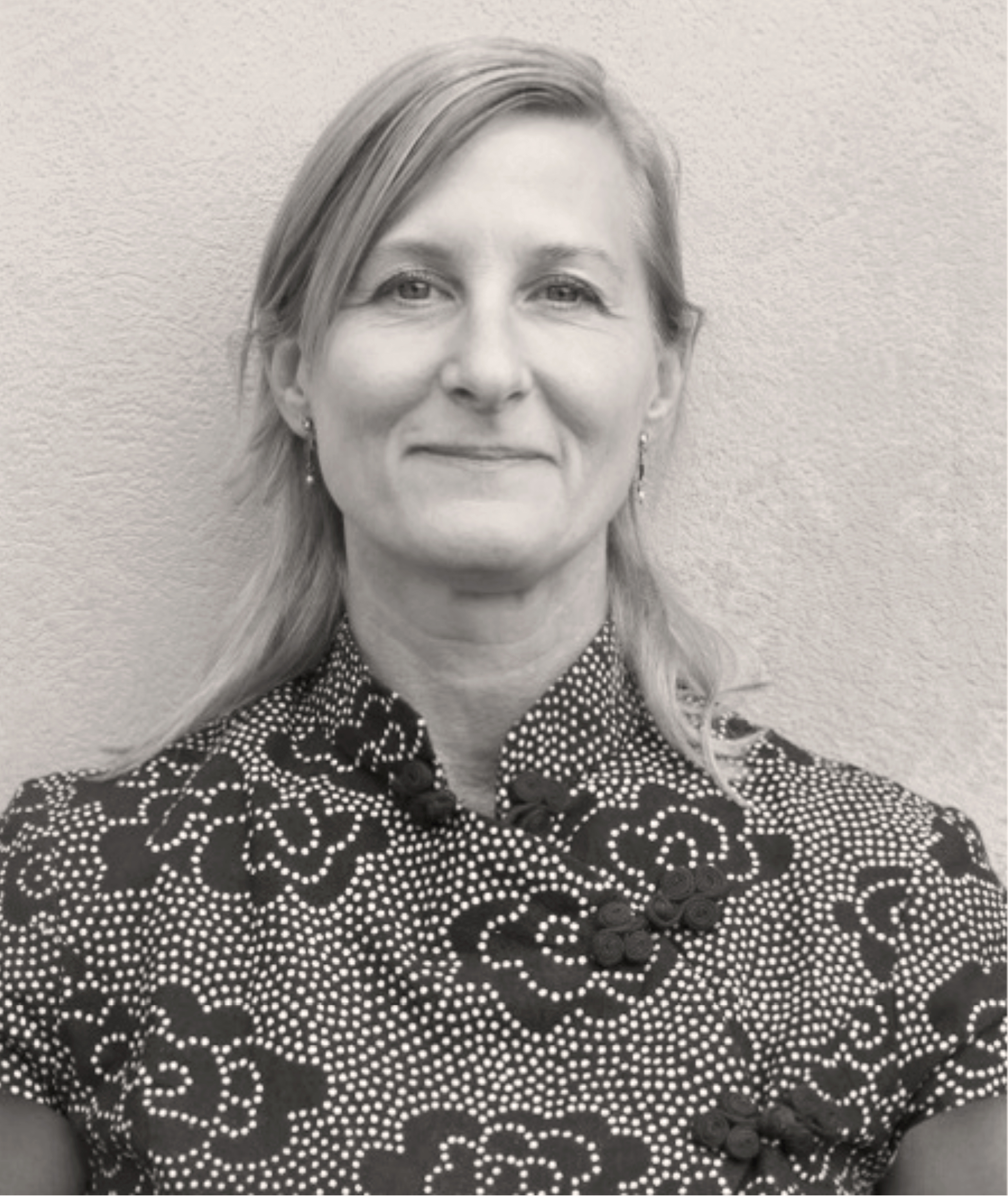
- Sara Szyber
- Born: 19 June 1963 (age 63)
- Education: Konstfack
- Occupation: interior designer

Sara Rebecka Torsson Szyber, born on June 16, 1963, is a Swedish interior and furniture designer.

Szyber's work includes furniture and interiors for Swedish companies including Design House Stockholm, Nola, Kateha and Svenskt Tenn, as well as museums including Historiska museet, Tekniska museet and Riksutställningar. On commission from Länsstyrelsen Gotland, she has designed Gotlands Naturum in cooperation with design agency Futurniture. On commission by Svensk Form, she designed the exhibition 17 Swedish Designers med kvinnliga formgivare, which toured in the US and Europe 2009–2012. 2014-19 member of the board of Svensk Form.
