= Kidiliz =

French children's clothing retailer

Kidiliz Group
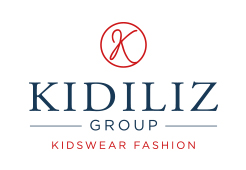
- Company type: Société par actions simplifiée
- Industry: Clothing industry
- Founded: 1962
- Headquarters: Saint Chamond, France
- Area served: Worldwide
- Key people: (founder) Roger Zannier (co-founder)
- Products: Clothing, children's clothing
- Net income: 1B (euro) (2010)
- Number of employees: 5,000 (2010)
- Website: kidilizgroup.com

Kidiliz Group, formerly Groupe Zannier, was a French firm composed of ready-to-wear brands. Its main market was children's clothing.

== History and description ==
The Kidiliz Group was founded in 1962 by Roger Zannier and has purchased existing brands over the years. There are more than 20 brands owned by the group or under licence.

December 1, 2016 : Groupe Zannier became Kidiliz Group The company has a portfolio of 15 brands, including Catimini Z, Absorba, Chipie and Lili Gaufrette.

In May 2017 the CEO Rémy Baume announced to merge the Kidiliz Group with the Semir Group, one of Chinas biggest manufacturers for children's clothing. The Semir Group will hold 80 percent of the new company.

In 2019 the Kilidiz Group filed for bankruptcy.

== Brands ==
=== Children clothing ===
- 3 Pommes
- Absorba
- Esprit
- Alphabet
- Beckaro
- Catimini (vêtements)
- Chillaround
- Chipie
- Confetti
- Dim
- Jean Bourget
- Junior Gaultier (brand under licence)
- Kidiliz
- Paul Smith Junior (brand under licence)
- Kenzo (brand under licence)
- Levi's (brand under licence)
- Lili Gaufrette
- Myfirstdressing
