= MacGinty =

MacGinty is a surname of Irish origin. Notable people with the surname include:

- AJ MacGinty (born 1990), Irish-born professional rugby player
- Raphael MacGinty (1927–2001), English former cricketer

== See also ==
- Tootsa MacGinty, a clothing company
- McGinty
