= Anna's =

Anna's may refer to:

- Anna's hummingbird (Calypte anna)
- Anna's Linens, a US retailer of household linens and other home goods
- Anna's Taqueria, a fast-food chain in the Boston area
- Anna's Swedish Thins, a brand of cookie manufactured by Lotus Bakeries
- Anna's Archive, a search engine for shadow libraries
