= Poron Absorba =

French textile and garment company

Poron
- Founded: 1816
- Headquarters: Troyes, France

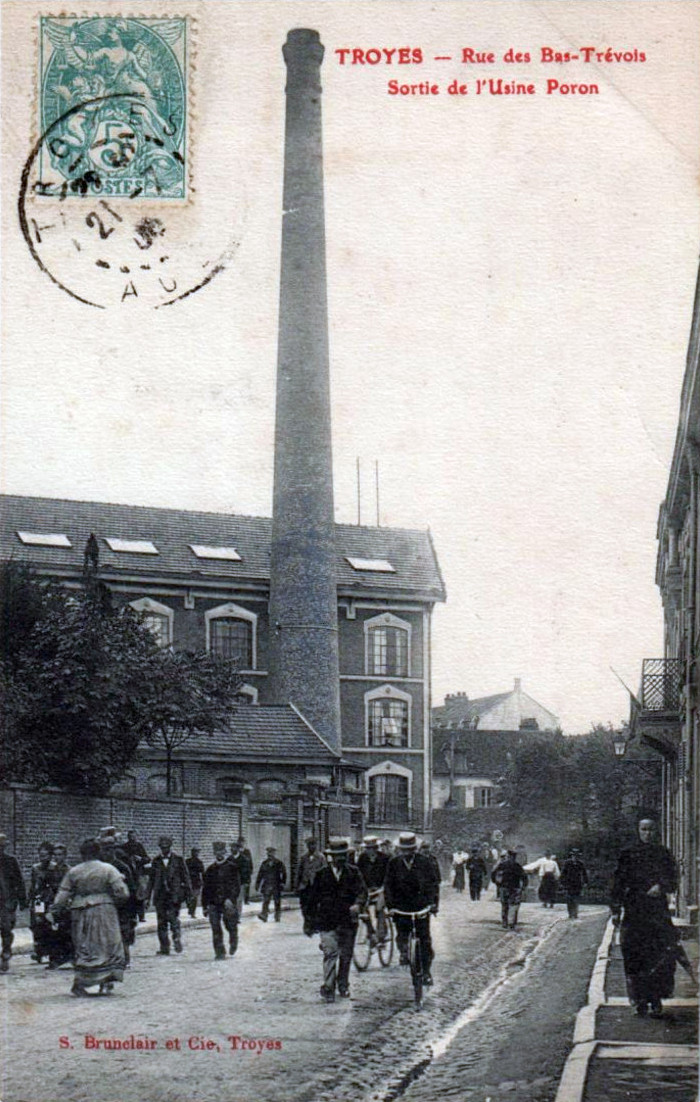
Poron exit, rue des Bas-Trévois, Troyes.

Poron Absorba S.A. of Troyes, was a French textile and garment company founded in 1816 as Établissements Poron. Its head office was located at 33 avenue des Martyrs-de-la-Résistance and its main factory on rue Suchetet at Vendeuvre-sur-Barse.

Its best-known brand was Absorba, a line of diapers introduced in 1949, with baby clothes and childrenswear added later.

The company was bought by Groupe Zannier, which became Kidiliz in 2016. Kidiliz went bankrupt in September 2019, most of its employees were laid off and the assets were bought by 7 other companies.

== Automobile ==
Poron manufactured an automobile in 1898. It was a rear-engined opposed-piston "motorcycle" with friction-drive and tiller steering.
