= List of royal warrant holders of the Swedish court =

Purveyors to the Court of Sweden are entitled to display the royal coat of arms with the motto Kunglig hovleverantör underneath.

Royal warrants of appointment in Sweden are granted to the purveyor (Swedish: Kunglig hovleverantör) by the monarch or other member of the royal family. To qualify for a warrant, the order must come from the Royal Court and the company must deliver its goods or services to the court. A royal warrant is personal and usually awarded to the managing director of the company rather than the company itself. All goods and services are paid for by the court.

== Current royal warrant holders ==
There are c. 130 purveyors:

- Abba Seafood
- Abu Garcia
- Almanacksförlaget
- Almgrens Sidenväveri
- Amanda Christensen
- Annas Pepparkakor
- Aqua Sport i Stockholm
- Arla Foods
- Arne Heine
- Arvid Nordquist
- Askwalls Gravyr
- Atelier Borgila
- Barnängen (Henkel Norden)
- Björn Axén
- Björnekulla Fruktindustrier
- Björnhammarens Naturprodukter
- Bogesunds Väveri
- Bolin, W.A.
- Borås Wäfveri
- BRIO
- Brämhults Juice
- Bukowski Auktioner
- Bölebyns Garveri
- Calligraphen
- Cecil Grafström
- Cloetta
- Delicato
- Designor
- Dr PersFood
- Duro Sweden
- E-foto i Borgholm
- Ejes chokladfabrik
- EKA-knivar
- Ekelund
- Ekströms (Procordia Food)
- Elektriska AB Lennström
- EngmoDun
- Engströms Livs
- Express-Tryck
- Fenix Outdoor (Fjällräven etc.)
- Fotograf Ingvar Arnmarker
- Freys
- Friends of Handicraft
- Frödinge Mejeri
- Fällkniven
- Fällmans Kött
- Fjällräven
- Gaudy Stockholm
- Gense
- Gevalia (Mondelēz International)
- Grand Hôtel Stockholm
- Guldfynd
- Gustavsbergs Porslinsfabrik
- Gysinge Centrum för Byggnadsvård
- Göteborgs Kex
- Hedéns Grafiska Konsult
- HL Hemtextil
- Hogia
- Hovboktryckare Arne Heine
- Hultberg Eftr. Ram & Förgyllning
- Husqvarna Group / Klippo
- HV Ateljé
- Hästens
- Iittala / Rörstrand
- IKEA
- Insjöns Väveri
- Interiör Inredningstextil
- Isaksson Porfyr
- J F Nordlöf
- Jyden
- K.A. Almgren Sidenväveri
- Kittys Hattar
- Klippo
- Klässbols linneväveri
- Konditori Bankett
- Kosta Boda
- Kvänum kök
- Lars Kjellander Ordensateljé
- Leif Ljungquist
- Liljeholmens Stearinfabrik
- Lindvalls Kaffe
- Lisa Elmqvist Fiskaffär
- Loka (Spendrups)
- Ludvig Svensson
- Lundhags Skomakarna
- Lundqvist Inredningar
- Lysekils, Bakkavör Sweden
- Läkerol (Cloetta)
- Löfbergs
- Manfred Ädelsmed
- Martin Olsson
- Mats Jonasson Målerås
- Melanders Blommor
- Militär Ekiperings Aktiebolaget
- Mille Notti
- Mustadfors Bruk
- Målerås glasbruk
- Märta Måås-Fjetterström
- Nordiska Flaggfabriken
- Norma Precision
- Nära Kroppen /Palmgrens
- Observer Sverige
- Operakällaren
- Orrefors
- Oscar Jacobson
- Oscar Wigén
- Önos (Procordia Food)
- Pahne Textil
- Paradisverkstaden Design
- Polaris Optic
- Poseidon Industri
- Pågen
- Ramlösa Hälsobrunn (Carlsberg Sverige)
- Rikstelegram RT
- Rosas Handel
- Saab Automobile
- Sabis
- Sandberg Tyg och Tapet
- Sandegaards Hantverk
- Scand Office
- Seger Europe
- Scandinavian Eyewear
- Skeppshultcykeln
- Bageri Skogaholm
- Skomakeri Framåt
- Skrufs glasbruk
- Skultuna mässingsbruk
- Skånska stearinljusfabriken
- Smedbo
- Solenbergs Bokbinderi
- Sporrong
- Steens Herrmode
- Stenströms Skjortfabrik
- Sterling Finemballage
- Stockholms Militärekiperings
- Strömma Turism & Sjöfart
- Studio Glashyttan i Åhus
- Stutterheim Raincoats
- Svenskt Tenn
- Tarkett Sommer
- TeGe-Produkter
- Tretorn Sweden
- Tryckeri AB Björkmans Eftr.
- Tvätt i Stockholm
- Wasabröd
- Wasasten
- Werner Vögeli
- Vademecum (Hardford)
- Victoria Scandinavian Soap
- Västerbottensost (Norrmejerier)
- Mauritz Widforss
- Vi Engströms Livs
- VO Vapen
- Zia Design
- Z-Metallform
- Örnäs Produkter

== Bibliography ==
- Gunnarsson, Maria; Gunnarsson, Erik (2001). By Appointment to His Majesty the King of Sweden. Uppsala: Bild & kultur. ISBN 91-89210-01-8.
- Gunnarsson, Maria; Gunnarsson, Erik (1999). Konung Carl XVI Gustafs hovleverantöre (in Swedish). Uppsala: Bild & kultur. ISBN 91-89210-00-X.
