= Skultuna mässingsbruk =

Swedish brass manufacturer

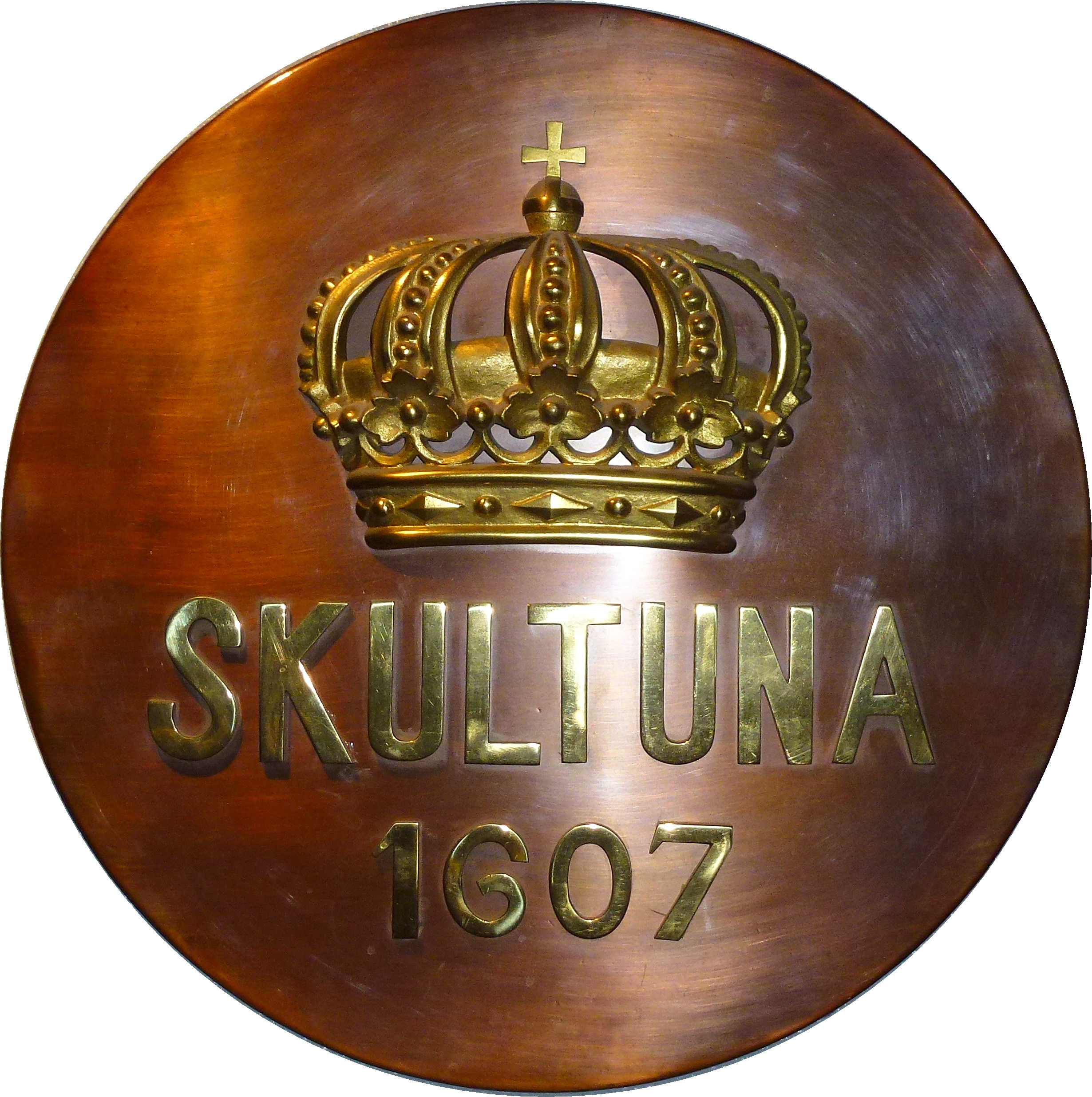
- Type: Brass foundry
- Founded: 1607
- Founder: Charles IX
- Headquarters: Västerås, Sweden
- Key people: Viktor Blomqvist, CEO
- Products: Ornaments, gifts and household products
- Website: skultuna.com/eu/

Skultuna Messingsbruk (literally "Skultuna Brassworks") is a Swedish manufacturer of brass products, founded in 1607 at the behest of King Charles IX. The company is based in Skultuna, near Västerås, and is among the world's oldest continuously operating companies.

== Early history ==
Skultuna Messingsbruk was founded on 11 February 1607 by order of King Charles IX, who sought to establish a domestic brass industry and reduce dependence on imports. Skultuna was chosen for its access to water power, charcoal and copper. Early products included brass sheets, chandeliers and candlesticks. In the late 19th century, designer Carl-Hjalmar Norrström created several works for the company, including a baptismal font that won gold medals at exhibitions in Stockholm (1897) and Paris (1900).

== Present day ==
The production in Skultuna is continuing in an unbroken line since 1607, every year about five hundred chandeliers are built, a couple of thousand candlesticks are mounted and polished, thousands of cuff links are packaged and shipped around the world. There are two product lines today: Home Accessories and Fashion Accessories and it is working closely with some of the world's leading designers like Ilse Crawford, Richard Hutten, Claesson Koivisto Rune, Monica Förster, and Thomas Sandell. Among the many designers that worked with the firm through 1900s Sigvard Bernadotte and Pierre Forssell stands out with their timeless modernism.

== Royal Warrant Holder to the Swedish Court ==
Skultuna is a Purveyor to the Court of Sweden. Since its foundation in 1607, at the behest of King Charles IX, it has been a Royal Warrant Holder to the Swedish court. To qualify for a warrant, the order must come from the royal court to which the company must deliver its goods or services. A royal warrant is personal and usually awarded to the managing director of the company rather than the company itself. All goods and services are paid for by the court. Crown Princess Victoria visited Skultuna Messingsbruk on 14 June 2007 during the 400-year anniversary and inaugurated a bronze memorial plaque of the founder King Charles IX.

== Tourism ==
Skultuna Brassworks is a tourist attraction in Västmanland, Sweden. The historic factory site houses a museum, a café and several shops.

== Gallery ==
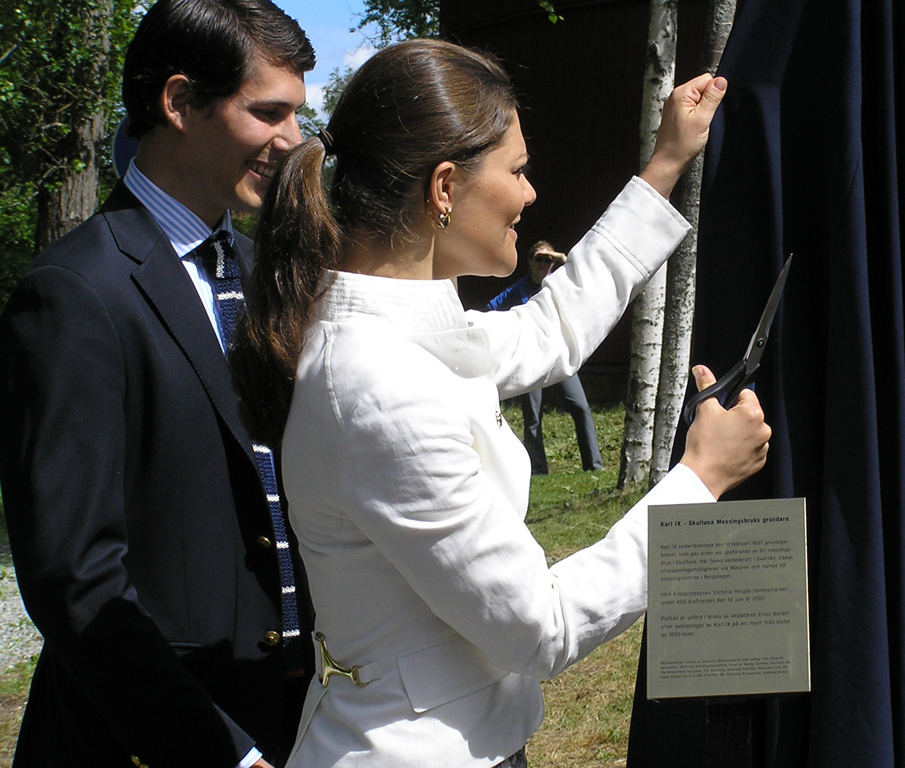
Crown Princess Victoria of Sweden with the present managing director Viktor Blomqvist

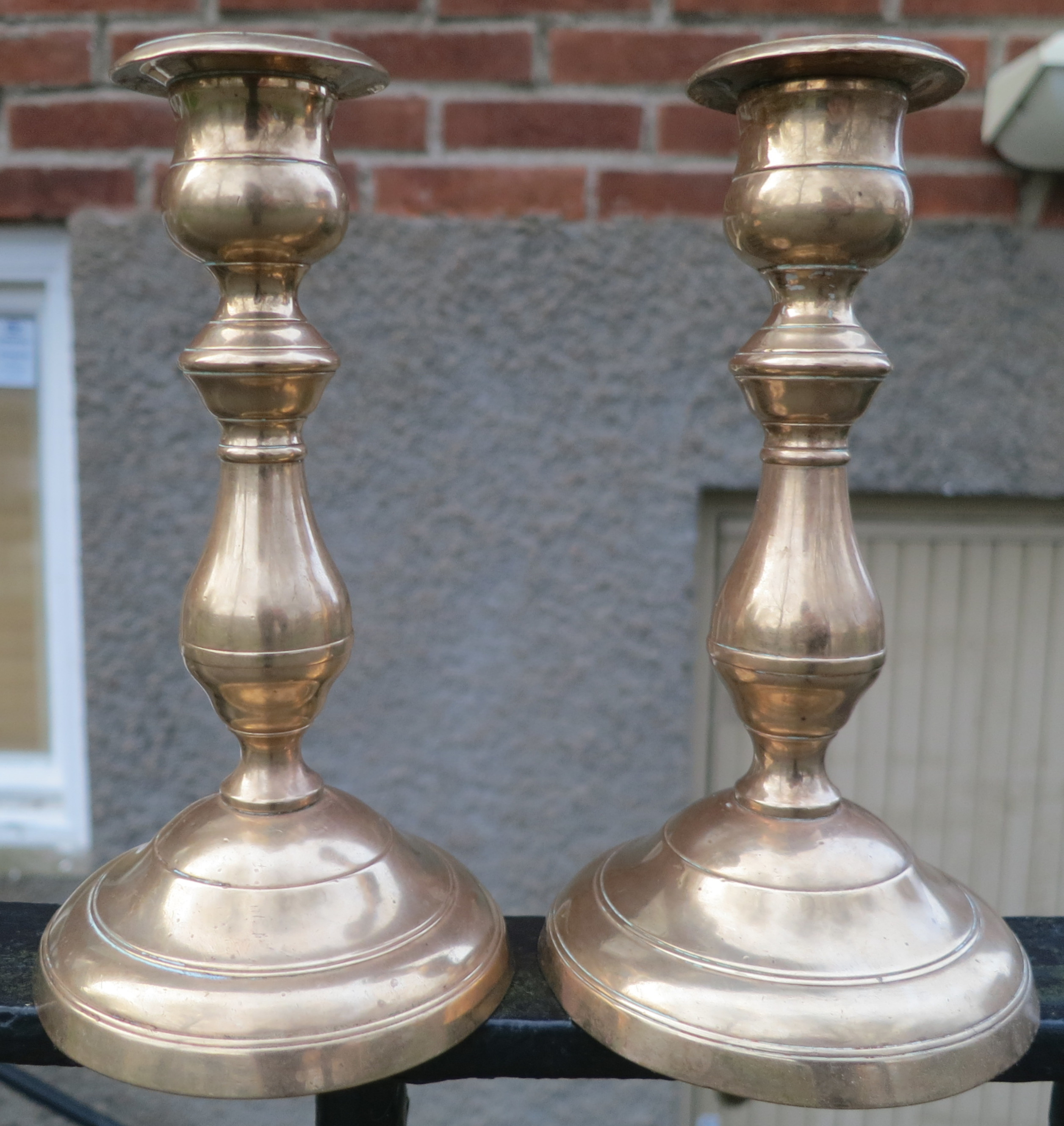
Brass candle holders, model number 13, by Skultuna Messingsbruk

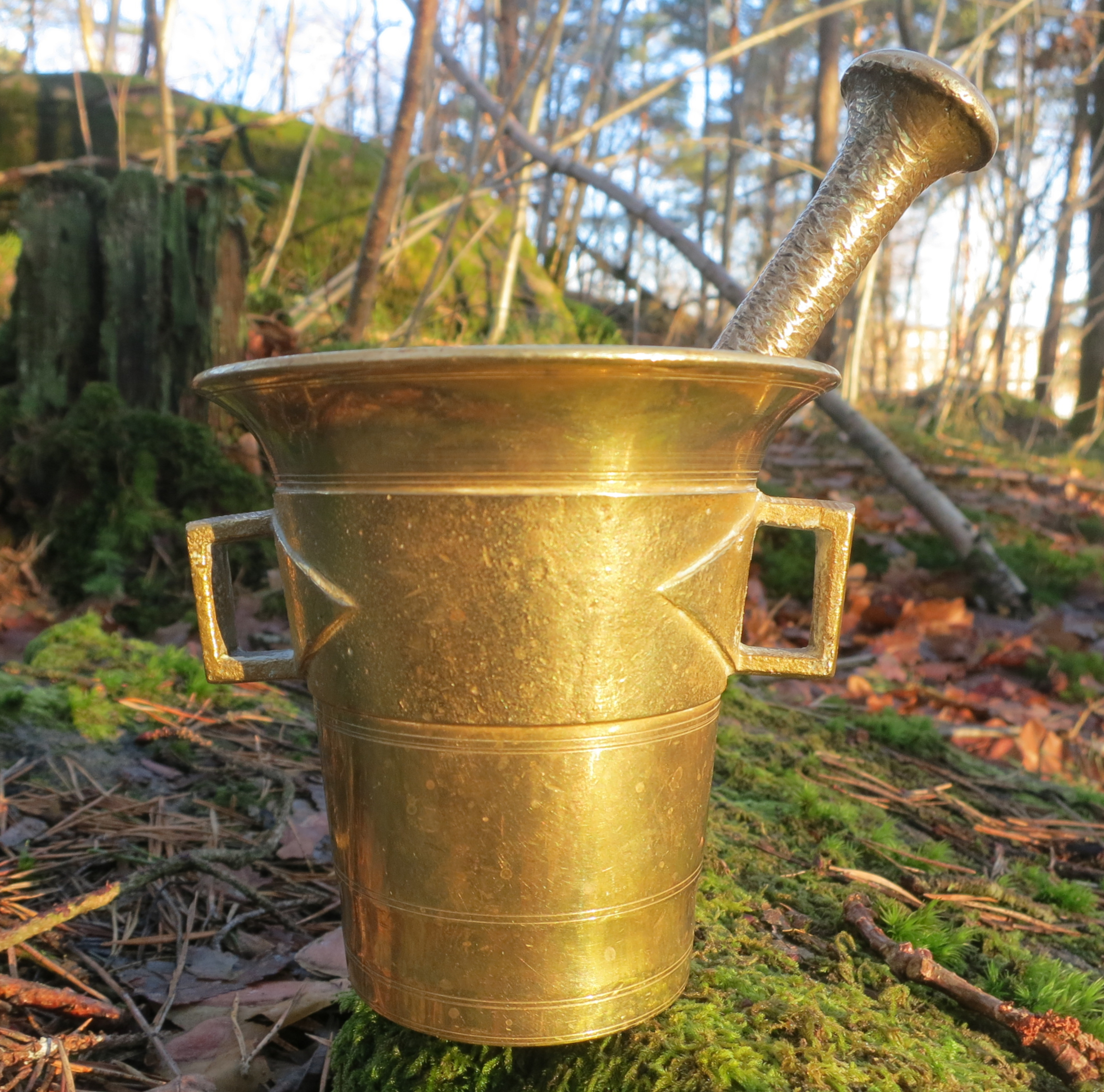
Brass mortar and pestle, model number 4, by Skultuna Messingsbruk

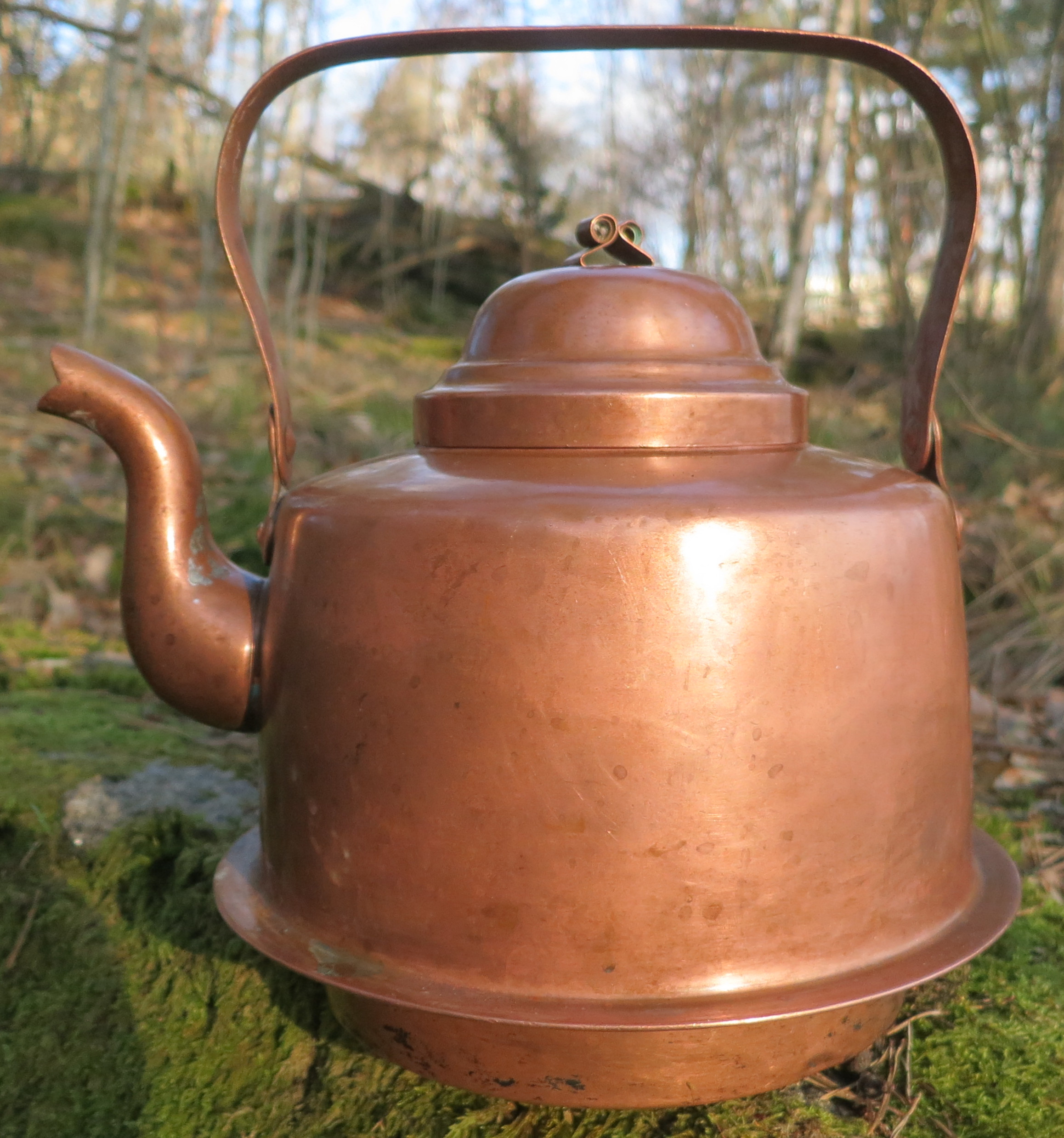
Copper kettle (2.5 l) by Skultuna Messingsbruk

== See also ==
- List of oldest companies
