= Hästens =

Swedish manufacturer

Hästens Sängar AB
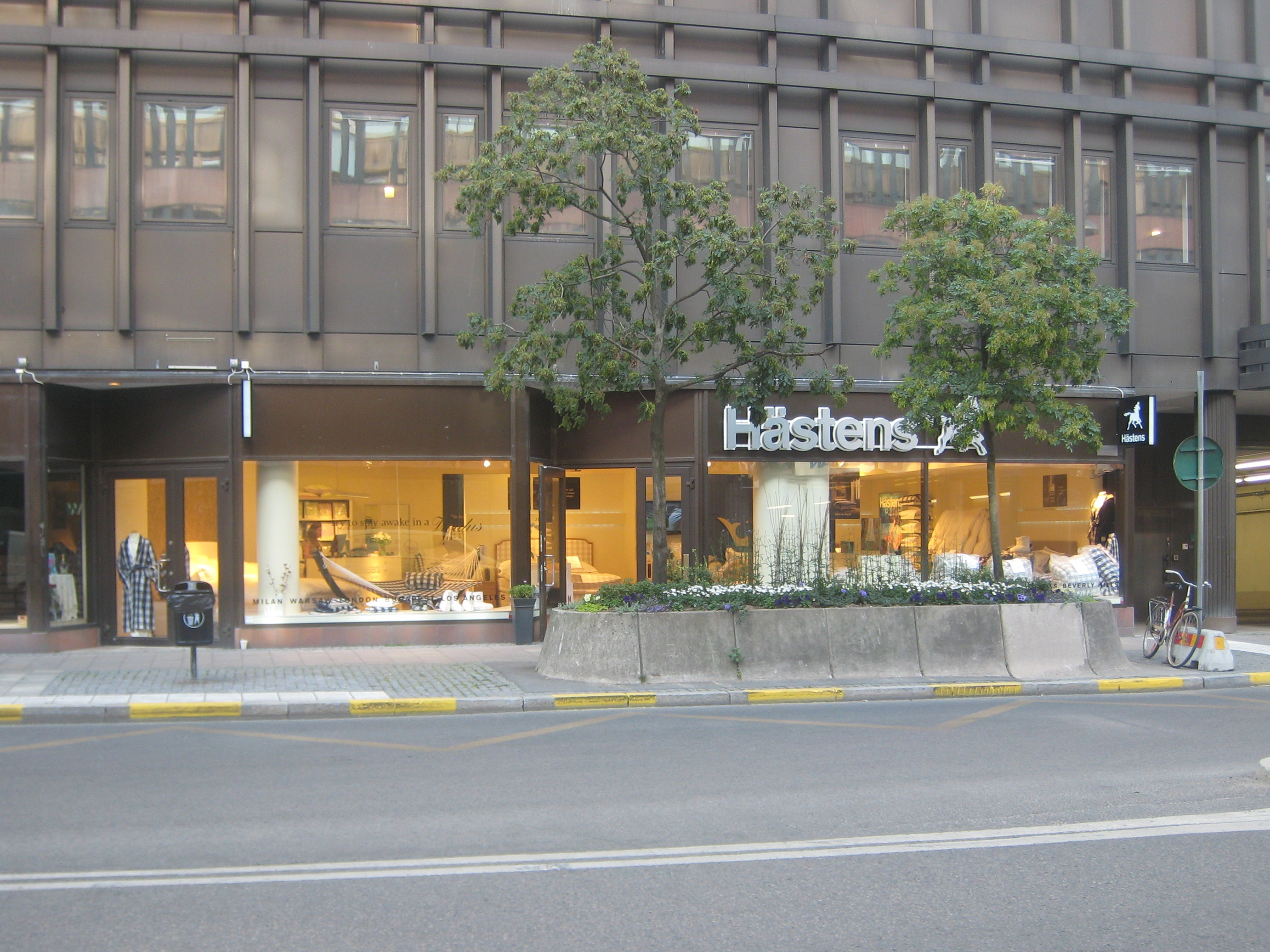
- Type: Privately held company
- Industry: Furnitures / Luxury goods
- Genre: Family business
- Founded: 1852
- Founder: Pehr Adolf Janson
- Headquarters: Köping, Sweden
- Area served: Global locations
- Key people: Jan Ryde (Executive Chairman & Owner), Robert Carlén (CFO).
- Products: High-end Mattress/beds, bedding, accessories
- Subsidiaries: Hästens Beds Ab
- Website: http://www.hastens.com/

Hästens Sängar AB, or simply Hastens (Swedish pronunciation: [ˈhɛ̌sːtɛns], Swedish for "The horse's" as in "the horse's beds"), is a Swedish manufacturer established in 1852, that produces and trades in mattresses, bed linen, bedding pillows and lifestyle accessories.

The company was founded by Pehr Adolf Janson in 1852 as a saddler business and is a family-owned company. David Janson shifted their focus in the early 1900s from making saddles to making beds. By 1952, a century after its foundation, they had become the official bedding supplier of Sweden's royal court, a title they share with IKEA since 1984. The company continues to manufacture all beds in its factory in Sweden.

Hästens manufactures beds and mattresses by using materials such as cotton, horse hair, wool and flax. Hästens retail stores also sell bedlinen, pillows, duvets and accessories.

== History ==
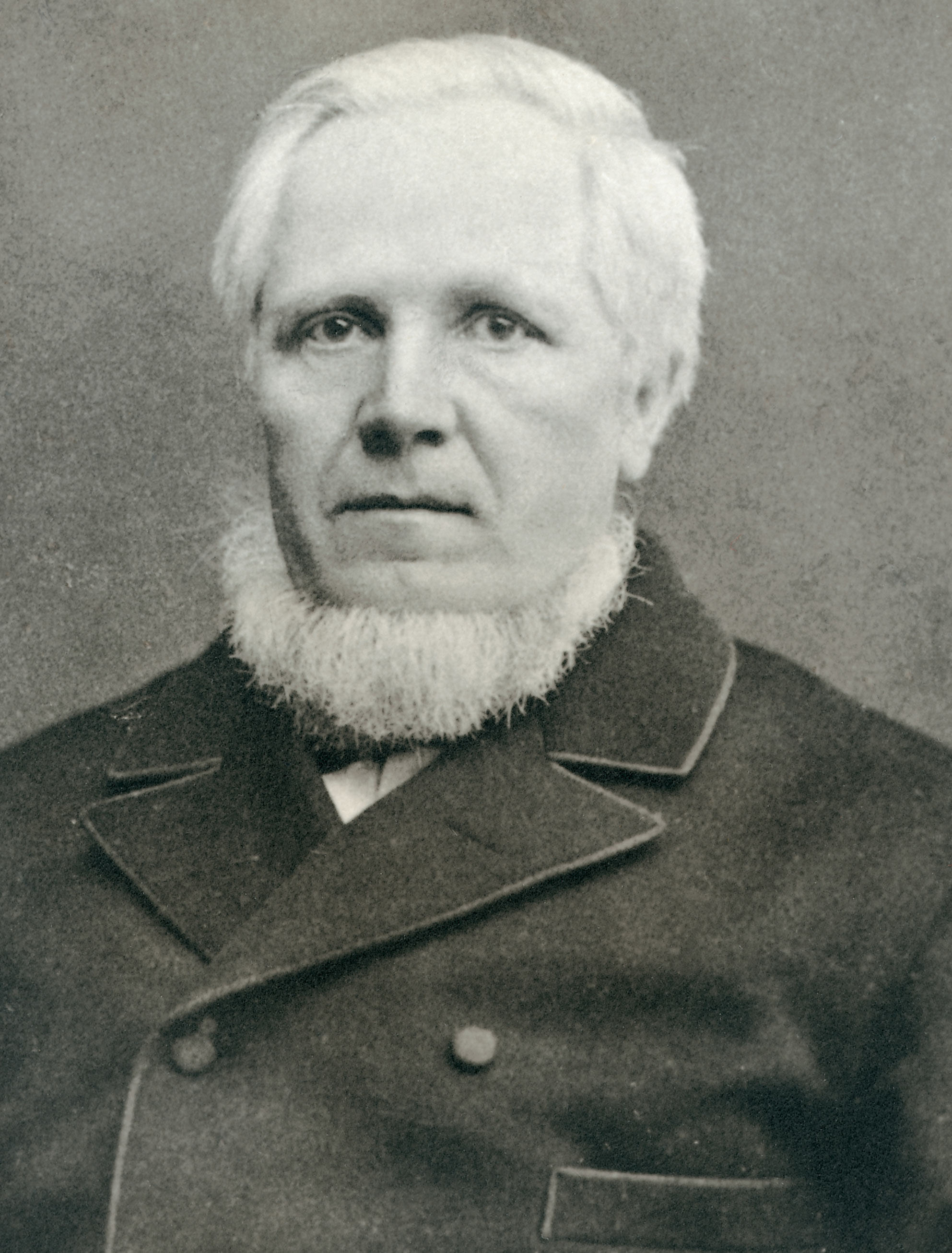
Pehr Adolf Janson, founder of Hästens.

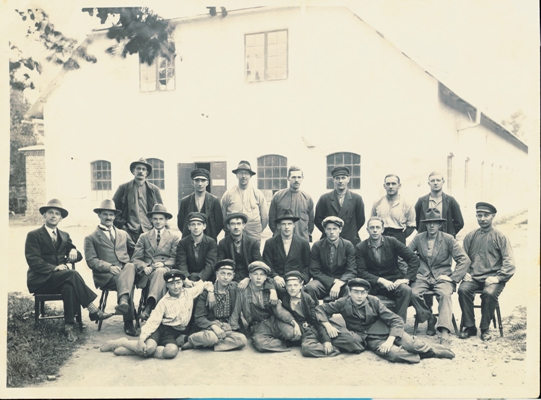
David Janson (to the left) and master craftsmen photographed by David in front of the Hästens factory in Köping in the beginning of the 1900s

Hästens commissioned this 2013 commercial with Dutch attorney Bram Moszkowicz to show how solid their new guarantee policy is.

Hästens was founded in 1852 by Pehr Adolf Janson, a Swedish master saddler after being awarded his master certificate by Oscar I of Sweden. Janson founded a saddlery business in Hede, near Köping, Sweden, producing saddles, harnesses, and mattresses filled with horsehair.

Janson's sons, Adolf Fredrik and Per Thure, both became saddlers. Adolf Fredrik later pursued a career in politics, while Per Thure continued the family business, eventually working alongside his son, David Janson.

In 1917, David Janson became involved in the business to be more focused on bed manufacturing and discontinued the production of saddles and harnesses. That year, Hästens introduced a horse logo referencing its origins in saddlery. With more bed production demand, Hästens established its own horsehair processing mill and began selling its beds through Swedish department stores, including Nordiska Kompaniet.

In 1939, David Janson commissioned British architect Ralph Erskine to design a new factory in Köping, which was completed in 1950.

In 1952, King Gustaf VI Adolf appointed Hästens as a Royal Purveyor to the Swedish Court.

In 1963, David Janson's daughter Solveig Ryde, who had previously served as the company's chief financial officer, assumed responsibility for its operations alongside her husband, Jack Ryde, and her sisters, Ethel and Yvonne.

In 1978, Jack Ryde introduced Hästens' blue-check pattern, which became a registered trademark of the company, as well as the 2000T bed model "at the Stockholm Furniture Fair.

In 1988, their son Jan Ryde assumed leadership of the company. Under Ryde's leadership, the company expanded beyond the Swedish market, entering several European countries during the 1990s, including Finland, Norway, Denmark and Germany, followed by the United States in 1999.

In 1995, Hästens received a renewed Royal Purveyor appointment from King Carl XVI Gustaf.

In 1998, the company partnered again with Ralph Erskine to expand its Köping factory, with architect Ralph Erskine.

In 2000, Hästens opened its first branded retail store in Stockholm.

== Hästens today ==
=== Markets ===
Hästens currently operates retail stores around the world in locations such as: Stockholm, London, Dallas, Houston, Paris, Amsterdam, Munich, Israel, Zurich, Frankfurt, Barcelona, Bari, Brussels, Malta, New York, México City, Beijing, Shanghai, Hong Kong, Taipei, Seoul Manchester and Singapore.

== Awards ==
- 1952 – Purveyor to the Swedish Royal Court
- 2006 – Swedish Trade Council Export Award & Best International Growth Company by Ernst & Young
- 2010 – Wallpaper* Design Award Best Bed
- 2011 – Palme d'Or de la Literie de Prestige
- 2013 – Signum Priset Sweden
- 2015 – Hurun Report: The Best of the Best Awards 2015

== Legal cases ==
In 2000, a Swedish court ruled that Hästens was not allowed to advertise with phrases such as "The finest beds in the world" and "due to [our unique manufacturing process in Köping], we can offer 25 years' warranty on springs and frames". The latter was, among other reasons, because the springs and frames were actually manufactured by a subcontractor. Many companies have tried to copy the check patterns and Hästens has successfully undertaken legal procedures in several countries against infringements and counterfeits. As of 2011, the phrase "At Hästens we set out to make the best beds in the world." is used.
