= Skultuna =

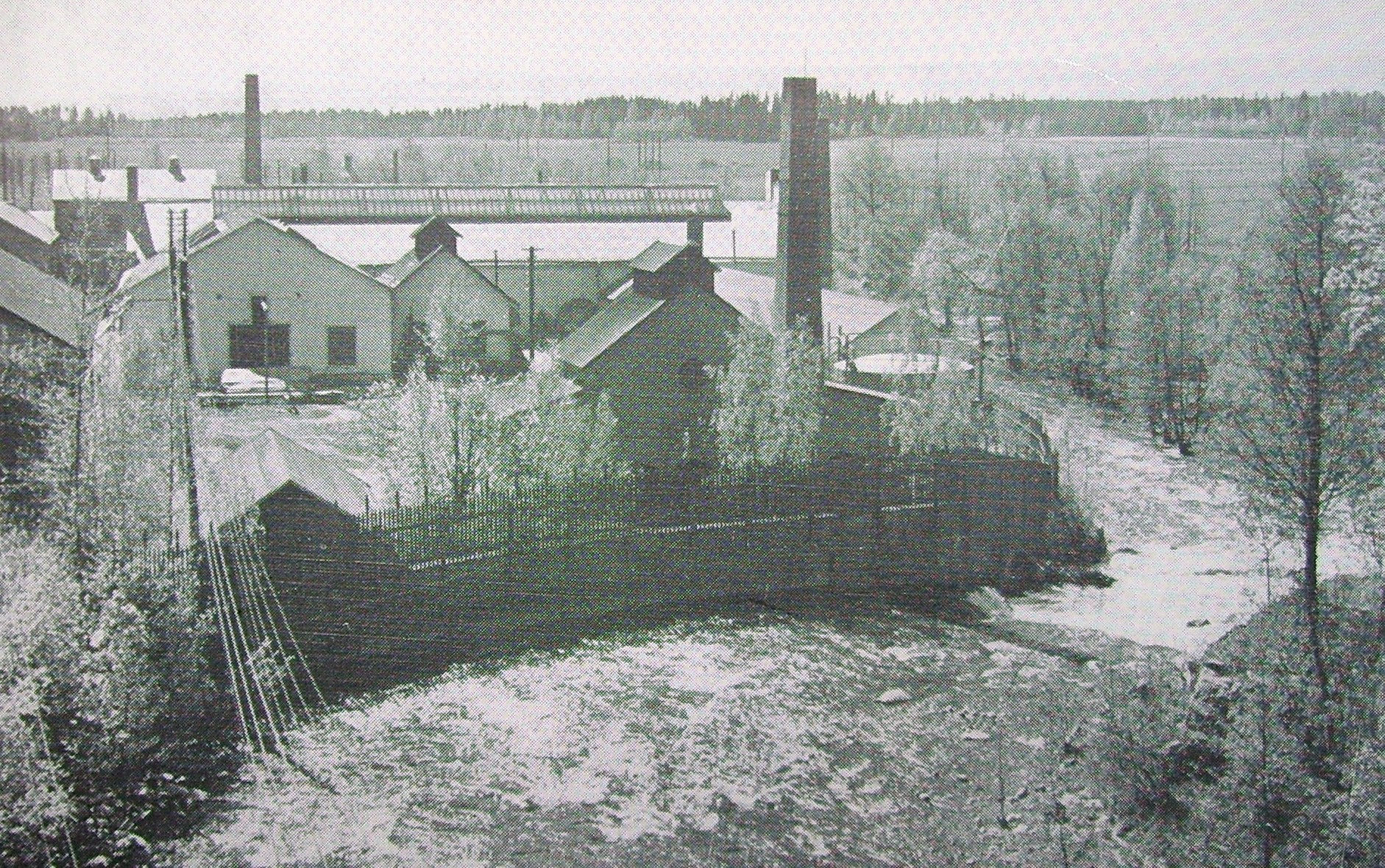
- Skultuna bruk

- Location within Västmanland Location within Sweden
- Coordinates: 59°43′N 16°25′E
- Country: Sweden
- Province: Västmanland
- County: Västmanland County
- Municipality: Västerås Municipality

Area
  - Total: 2.13 km^{2} (0.82 sq mi)

Population (31 December 2010)
  - Total: 3,133
  - Density: 1,470/km^{2} (3,800/sq mi)
- Time zone: UTC+1 (CET)
  - Summer (DST): UTC+2 (CEST)

Skultuna (Swedish pronunciation: [ˈskɵ̂lːˌtʉːna]) is a locality situated in Västerås Municipality, Västmanland County, Sweden with 3,133 inhabitants in 2010.

Skultuna has some of Sweden's oldest industrial sites (including an early 17th-century brassworks, Skultuna Messingsbruk) as well as two runestones.

Skultuna was also the birthplace of:

- Julia Nyberg (1784–1854), author and songwriter
- Esbjörn Svensson (1964–2008), pianist, composer, and band leader
- Magnus Öström (born 3 May 1965), drummer, composer, and band leader. Svennson and Öström were childhood friends who formed their first band in Skultuna.
