= Josef Frank (architect) =

Austrian-Swedish architect and designer (1885–1967)

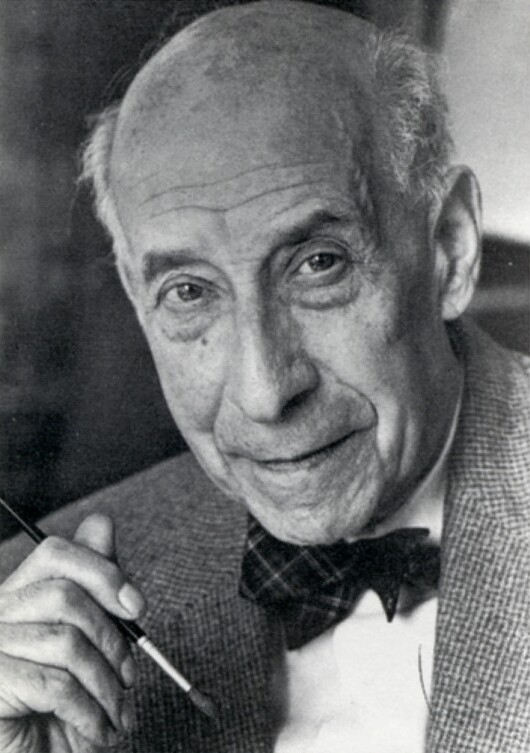
- Josef Frank, circa 1960
- Born: 15 July 1885; Baden bei Wien, Austria-Hungary
- Died: 8 January 1967 (aged 81); Stockholm, Sweden
- Education: Vienna University of Technology
- Occupation: Architect
- Relatives: Philipp Frank (brother)
- Buildings: Leopoldine-Glöckel-Hof, Vienna

Josef Frank (Austrian German: [fraŋk]; 15 July 1885 – 8 January 1967) was an Austrian and later Swedish, architect, artist, and designer. Together with Oskar Strnad, he created the Vienna School of Architecture, and its concept of Modern houses, housing and interiors. After leaving Austria due to rising antisemitism, Josef Frank started working at Swedish interior design store Svenskt Tenn in 1934, where he became a key figure in shaping the company's design identity. He is today considered one of the most important Swedish designers.

== Career ==
=== Austria ===
Born into a Jewish family in Baden bei Wien, with roots in Heves, Hungary, Josef Frank was the son of textile merchant Ignaz (Isak) Frank (1851–1921) and Vienna-born Jenny Frank (1861–1941). He later designed their grave, located in the old Jewish section of Vienna’s Central Cemetery (Group 19, Row 58, Grave No. 52). He was the brother of the physicist, mathematician, and philosopher Philipp Frank.

He studied architecture at the Vienna University of Technology. He then taught at the Vienna School of Arts and Crafts from 1919 to 1925. After being the only Austrian to contribute a house to the Stuttgart Werkbund Estate in 1927, he became the initiator and artistic director of the Vienna Werkbund Estate. From 1929 till 1930 Frank and Oskar Wlach elaborated the overall concept for Villa Beer in Vienna, including the interior design. Frank was the initiator and leader of the 1932 project Werkbundsiedlung in Vienna.

=== Sweden ===
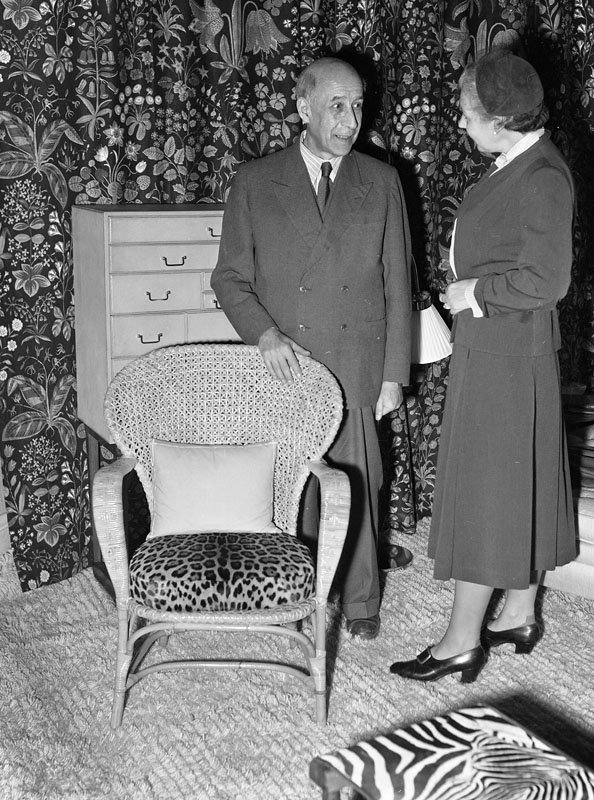
Frank with Estrid Ericson at Svenskt Tenn in 1952

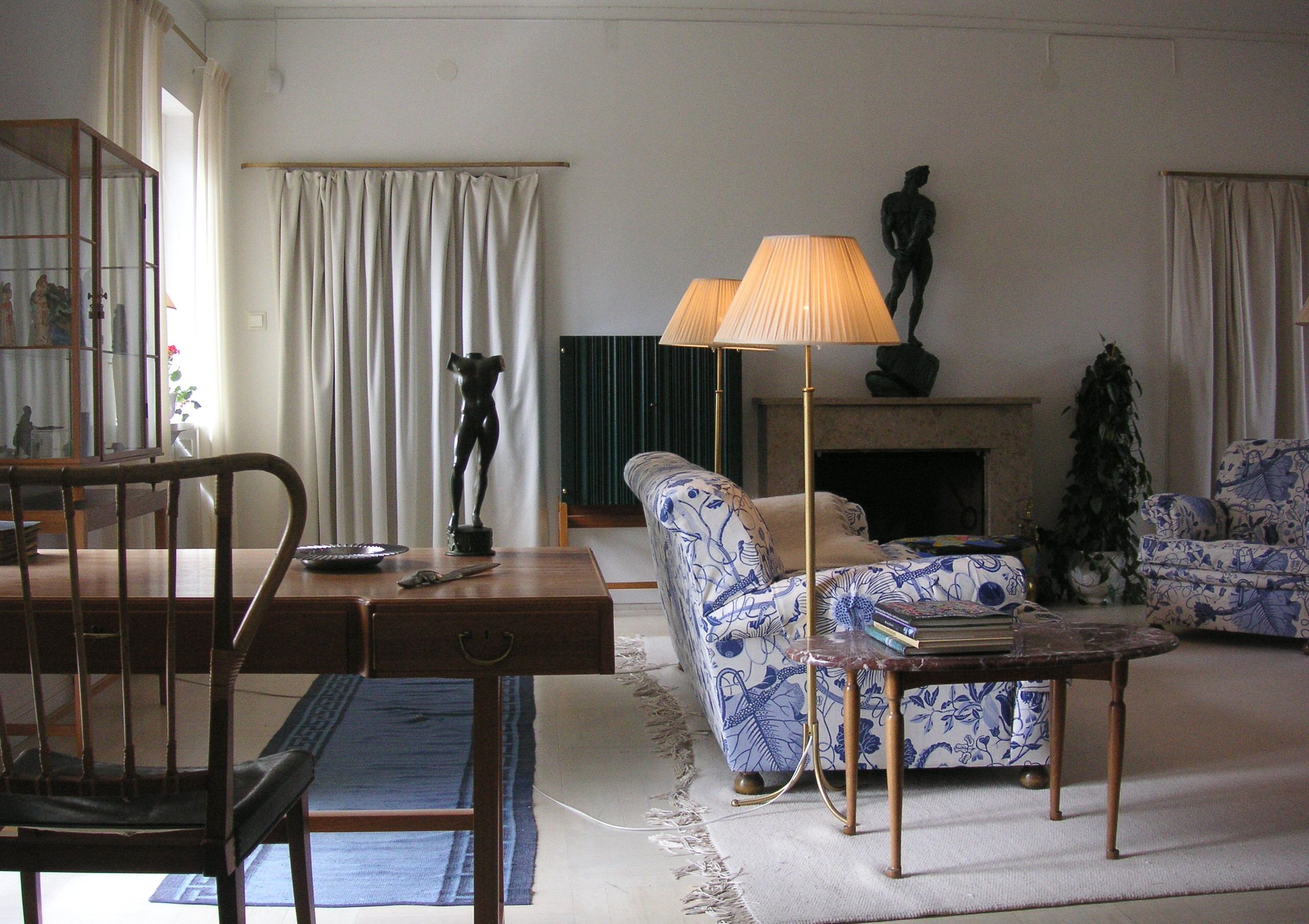
A living room, designed by Ericson and Frank, situated in the curator's building, called Annes Hus, which was built and constructed by Evert Milles in Stockholm's Millesgården on the island of Lidingö

In 1933, Frank and his Swedish wife Anna moved to Stockholm, intending only a temporary stay until the political situation in Austria improved; however, as anti-Semitism in Vienna grew increasingly brutal, Anna feared for Josef’s safety and pushed for their permanent relocation. After Germany annexed Austria on March 12, 1938, and declared all Jews stateless, he lost his Austrian citizenship. Initially denied Swedish citizenship, he was granted it in 1939 after pressure from politician Malte Jacobsson and poet Anders Österling.

In the early 1940s, Frank lived in the Manhattan part of New York City. Frank went on to become the most prestigious floral textile print designer at the Stockholm design company Svenskt Tenn. Frank also designed chairs, sofas, and cabinets. He had been recruited by the founder of the Svenskt Tenn brand, Estrid Ericson. He remained in Sweden after 1945.

== Legacy ==
Today Frank is considered a popular example of second Viennese Modernism. Frank dealt early on with public housing and housing estates. Contrary to most other architects of the interwar period in Vienna, he took the idea of settlement and not the creation of so-called superblocks, in municipal housing. He also rejected facade decor and clearly preferred functional forms. The Viennese architect and furniture designer Luigi Blau refers to him as one of his idols. In addition to his architectural work, he created numerous designs for furniture, furnishings, fabrics, wallpaper and carpet. He has been a painter, as well.

An exhibition of his textile designs was held in 2017 at the Fashion and Textile Museum in London.

== Recognition ==
- 1965 First Austrian Frank exhibition by the Austrian Society for Architecture
- 1965 Grand Austrian State Prize for Architecture
- 1981 Frank exhibition in the Austrian Museum of Applied Arts, Vienna
- 1991 The Josef-Frank-Gasse street in Donaustadt Vienna was named after the architect
- 2007 The exhibition Josef Frank. Architect and Outsider , The Jewish Museum Vienna field office Judenplatz
- 2010 Was honored with a Google Doodle on 15 July in honor of his 125th birthday.
- 2015–16 Exhibition "Josef Frank: Against Design" in the Austrian Museum of Applied Arts, Vienna

== Major architectural projects ==
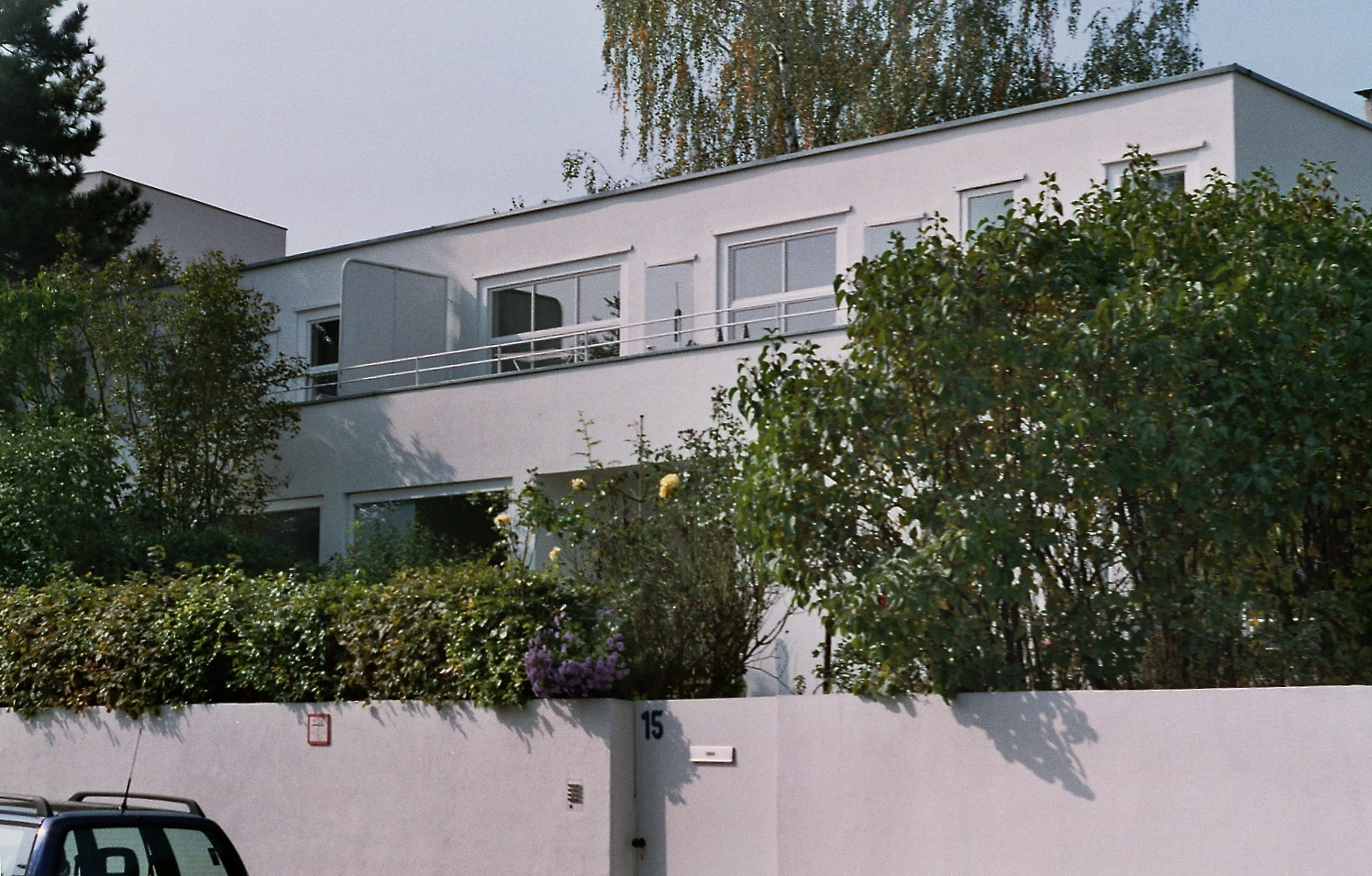
Duplex in the Weißenhofsiedlung, Stuttgart

- Exhibition design of the East Asian Museum in Cologne (1912)
- House Wilbrandtgasse 12, Vienna (1914) with Oskar Wlach and Oskar Strnad
- Municipal housing Hoffingergasse in Altmannsdorf (Vienna), (1921–24), together with Erich Faber
- Residential Building Wiedenhoferhof, Vienna (1924–25)
- Residential Building Winarskyhof (1924–26), together with Adolf Loos, Peter Behrens, Margarete Schütte-Lihotzky
- Duplex in the Weißenhofsiedlung, Stuttgart (1927)
- Residential Building Sebastian-Kelch-Gasse 1–3, Vienna (1928–29)
- House Beer (1929–30 with Wlach) The 800 square meter Villa Beer in Vienna 13th, Wenzgasse 12, realized in 1929 / 1930 for the rubber shoe sole manufacturer Julius Beer together with Oskar Wlach
- Residential Building Simmeringer Hauptstraße 142–150, Vienna, (1931–32) with Oskar Wlach
- Residential Building Leopoldine-Glöckel-yard in Vienna (1931–32)
- Management of the Werkbundsiedlung in Vienna and Project for a house at Woinovichgasse 32 (1932)
- Five villas in Falsterbo, southern Sweden (1927–1936)
- House Vienna 19th, Wilbrandtgasse 3 (1914; former house of Emil and Agnes Scholl), with Oskar Wlach and Oskar Strnad
- House Vienna 19th, Wilbrandtgasse 11 (1914; former house of Oskar and Hanny Strauss), with Oskar Wlach and Oskar Strnad
- Villa Hugo Blitz, Weilburgstrasse 22 in Baden near Vienna, together with Oskar Wlach, "terrace and storey building", visible from the lido to this day (1928, preliminary studies from 1926)

== Publications ==
- Architecture as Symbol: Elements of the German 'New Building', 1931 (in German)
- The International Werkbundsiedlung Vienna 1932, 1932 (in German)
- Josef Frank. Schriften/Writings (Deutsch/English); 2 Bände/2 Volumes; (Ed.): Tano Bojankin, Christopher Long and Iris Meder, Metroverlag, Wien 2012 ISBN 978-3-99300-086-8
