= Hjo =

Place in Västergötland, Sweden

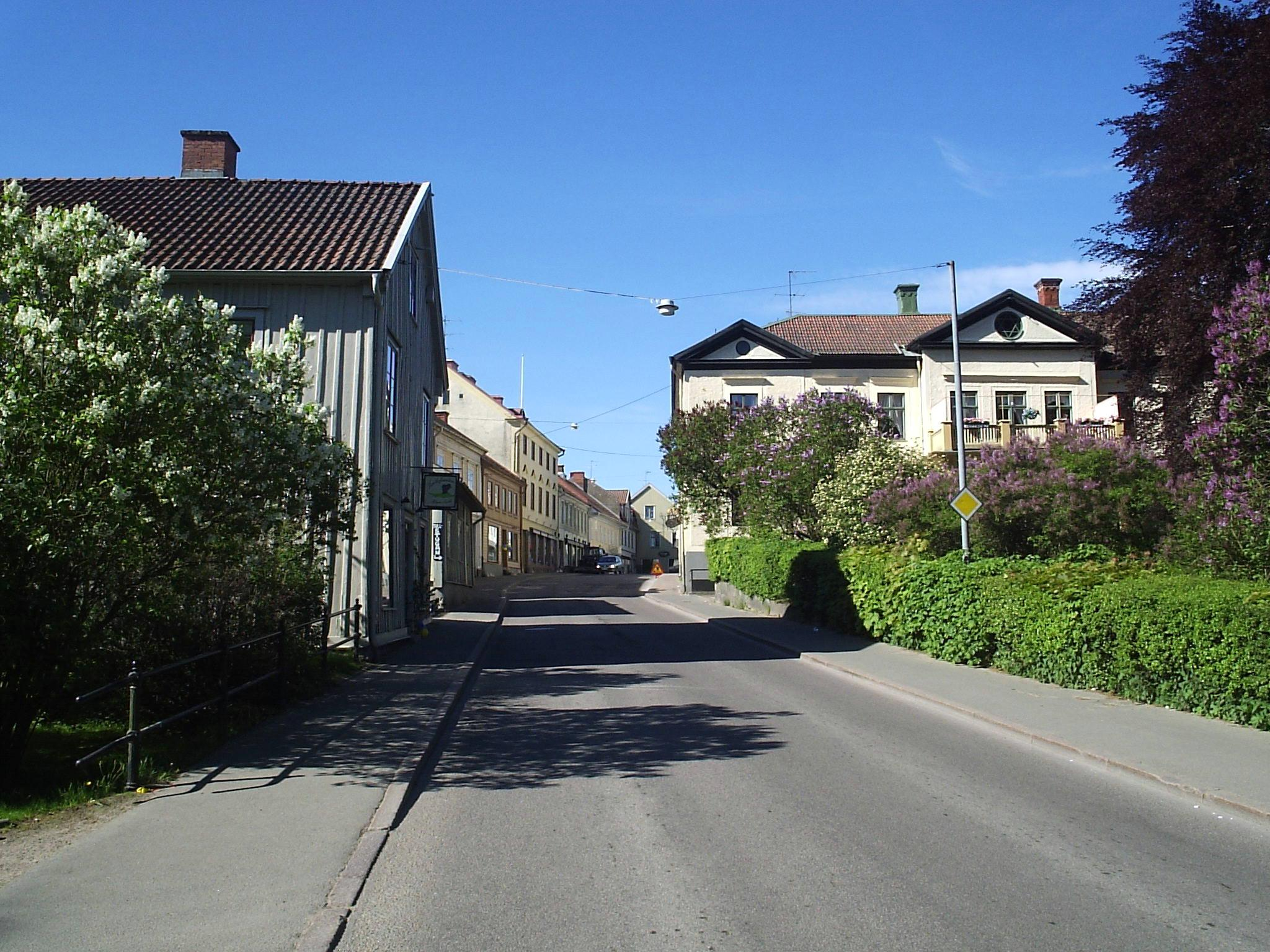
- Hamngatan in Hjo

- Location within Västra Götaland Location within Sweden
- Coordinates: 58°18′N 14°17′E
- Country: Sweden
- Province: Västergötland
- County: Västra Götaland County
- Municipality: Hjo Municipality

Area
  - Total: 4.54 km^{2} (1.75 sq mi)

Population (31 December 2010)
  - Total: 6,094
  - Density: 1,343/km^{2} (3,480/sq mi)
- Time zone: UTC+1 (CET)
  - Summer (DST): UTC+2 (CEST)

Hjo (Swedish pronunciation: [ˈjuː]) is a locality and the seat of Hjo Municipality, Västra Götaland County, Sweden. It had 6,094 inhabitants in 2010. The town is located on the west coast of Vättern.

== Etymology ==
The place is named after Hjoån 'Hjo river'. The meaning of the river name Hjo is probably 'muddy'. The way the name is spelled have been changed many times. Some of the previous ways of spelling the name has been Hyo, Hio, Hiyo and Hioo.

== History ==
Hjo is known to have had a charter as early as 1413. Hjo is, despite its small population, for historical reasons normally still referred to as a city. Statistics Sweden, however, only counts localities with more than 10,000 inhabitants as cities.

Many wooden towns have suffered fires, but Hjo has been relatively spared, apart from when the church and some adjacent houses burnt down in 1794. The city structure is therefore almost exactly the same as in medieval times.

Hjo works together with the cities of Eksjö and Nora to develop wooden towns as tourist attractions, under the joint name "Three wooden towns" (Tre trästäder).

In the year 2013, the city celebrated the town's 600th anniversary.

== Tourist attractions ==
The steamship S/S Trafik is one of the oldest steamships in Sweden. In the summer, it goes on small trips, such as trips to Visingsö, the biggest island in Vättern.

Estrid Ericson, founder of Swedish interior decorating company Svenskt Tenn, grew up in Hjo, where her father ran a hotel.

Guldkroksbadet is a free entry outdoor bath containing 3 pools, the largest one measures 50 by 25 meters. There is also two smaller ones for children. Guldkroksbadet also has a beach where you can swim in the lake.
