= Estrid Ericson =

Swedish interior designer

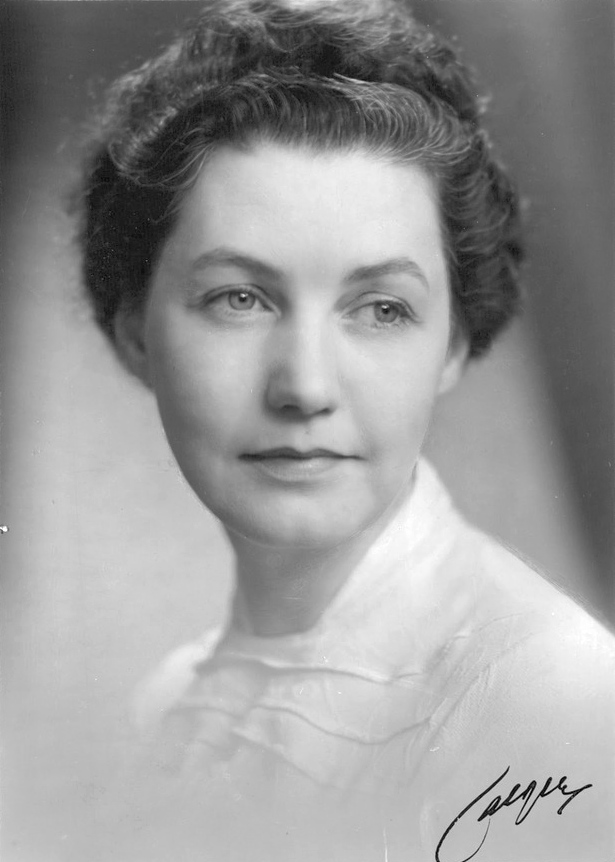
- Ericson in 1939
- Born: Estrid Maria Erikson; 16 September 1894; Öregrund, Sweden
- Died: 1 December 1981 (aged 87); Stockholm, Sweden
- Burial place: Hjo Cemetery, Sweden
- Occupations: Designer; entrepreneur
- Known for: Founding Svenskt Tenn
- Style: Functionalism; Swedish Modern style
- Spouse: Sigfrid Ericson (died 1973)

Estrid Maria Ericson (née Erikson; 16 September 1894 – 1 December 1981) was a Swedish designer, entrepreneur and founder of the interior decorating company Svenskt Tenn.

== Biography ==
Estrid Maria Erikson was born in Öregrund but grew up in Hjo by Lake Vättern in Sweden. Her parents ran a hotel. After they had passed away, she and three of her sisters took over the business. When Ericson had graduated by the age of 19, she moved to Stockholm to attend the art school today known as Konstfack. She specialized in pattern making.

After working a semester as an arts teacher back in Hjo, Ericson was offered a position at Svenska Slöjdföreningen, an arts and crafts company in Stockholm. She started working at the home and furniture department.

From there, Ericson started working as a consultant in home furnishing for her former teacher Elsa Gullberg. There, she got to know the pewter artist Nils Fougstedt, which was to become her partner in founding Svenskt Tenn in 1924. She got the money to start the company from a small inheritance from her father. The focus of the company was creating modern pewter decorative objects that Ericson designed herself, made by Fougstedt and two other staff members. These objects were displayed at the International Exhibition of Modern Decorative and Industrial Arts in Paris 1925, as well as in other fairs in Sweden and Europe. Later on, Ericson also employed other designers and architects, such as Uno Åhrén to create pewter furniture. Ten years later, in 1934, Ericson employed the Austrian functionalist designer Josef Frank to Svenskt Tenn. This companionship was the start of a new era for the company, expanding in furniture design and interior decorating. Svenskt Tenn, Frank and Ericson were representatives for the "Swedish Modern" style – a new interpretation of functionalism, a softer and more nature inspired functionalism. In her later years, Ericson again started creating pewter objects of her own design, up until her death in 1981.
