= Polarn O. Pyret =

Swedish childrenswear clothing brand

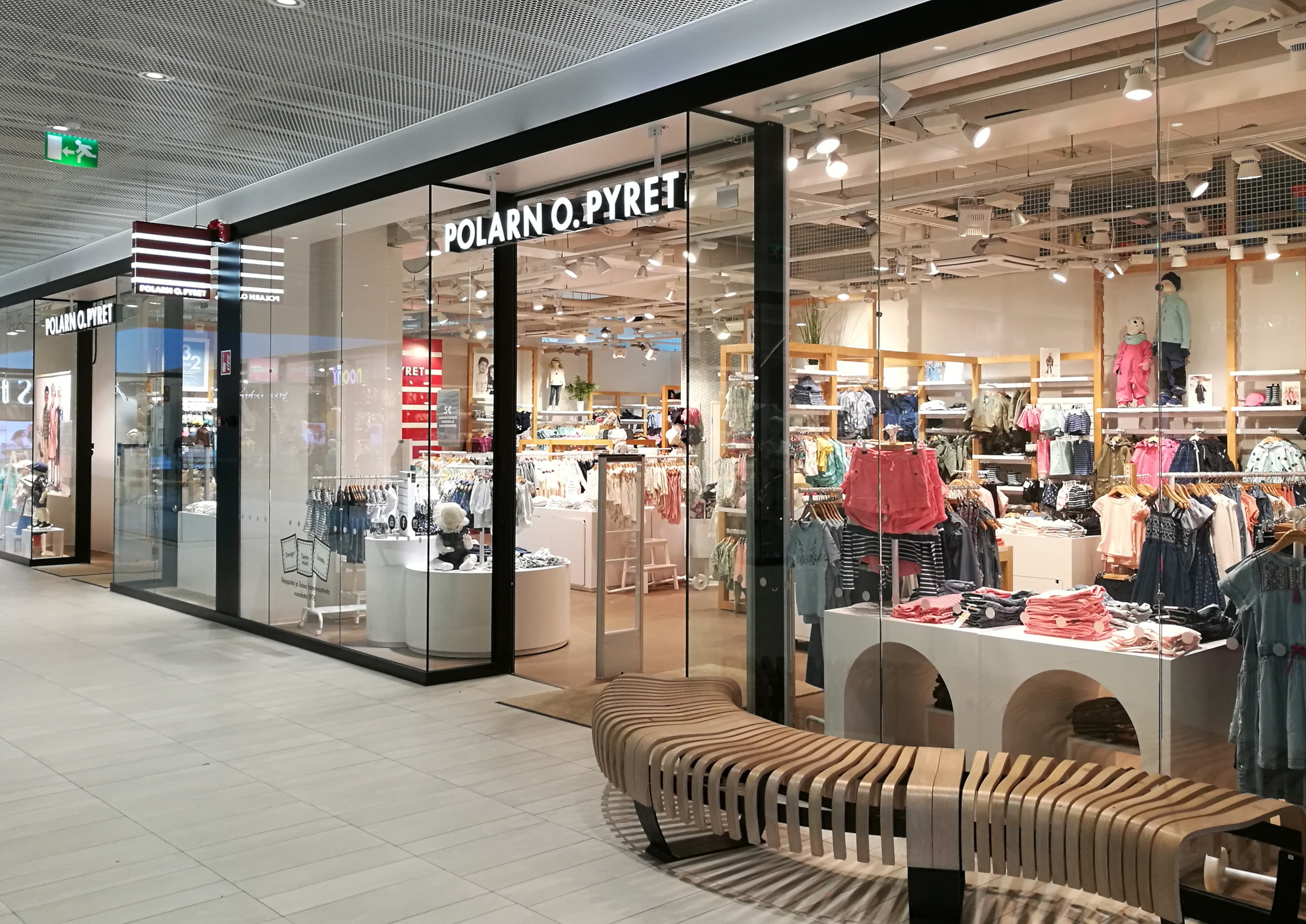
A Polarn O. Pyret shop in Oulu, Finland.

Polarn O. Pyret is a Swedish children's clothing brand, based in Stockholm. Polarn O. Pyret designs, produces and distributes baby and childrenswear, and operates a chain of shops in Europe and the US. The name means "Buddy and The Little One" in Swedish, although it is often shortened to "PO.P".

The brand gained media attention when one of their garments was worn by Prince George for his first official Christmas portrait in November 2014.

== History ==
Polarn O. Pyret began by selling condoms. In the early 1900s, Nils Adamsson travelled around Västergötland in Sweden selling sewing machines. He was struck by the size of families – and how poor they were. He wanted to help them have fewer children. In 1909, Adamsson bought a tobacco shop in Falköping, where he began selling condoms imported from Germany. Nils and Karin Adamsson sold medical products alongside tobacco, which gave their business a certain legitimacy. In the early 1940s, they began selling baby products under the name of “Pyret”, Swedish for "The Little One".

Their shops had two different departments – one for medical products, the other for baby products. The idea was that mothers would not have to pass through the “men’s department” – and that men would not have to be around women and children when they bought their products. The last restrictions on condom sales in Sweden were lifted in the 1970s, which reduced prices. As a result, in 1976 the company phased out contraceptive sales and changed its name to Polarn & Pyret AB.

The driving force behind the creation of Polarn O. Pyret in the mid-1970s were CEO Katarina af Klintberg and designer Gunilla Axen. It was also a coincidence that Axen's French husband is called Paul-Arnaud Pirette, almost a homonym of the company's name.

== Products ==
Polarn O. Pyret makes clothing and outdoor wear for children aged up to 12 years. The company does not merchandise its clothing by gender and much of its range is gender neutral. Their clothing is known for being durable and easy to hand down.

== Charity campaigns ==
Polarn O. Pyret has previously participated in fundraising for Children in Need by asking its customers to return outgrown clothes in exchange for store credit. The returned clothes were then resold at a lower price to raise money for the charity. fashion= conference of special needs https://en.wikipedia.org/w/index.php?title=Polarn_O._Pyret&action=edit&editingStatsId=vgid69dv50cgvhhpum6s6t1oue013ni4&editingStatsOversample=1&gesuggestededit=1 https://en.wikipedia.org/w/index.php?title=Polarn_O._Pyret&action=edit&editingStatsId=vgid69dv50cgvhhpum6s6t1oue013ni4&editingStatsOversample=1&gesuggestededit=1
