= Anna's Swedish Thins =

Swedish cookie company

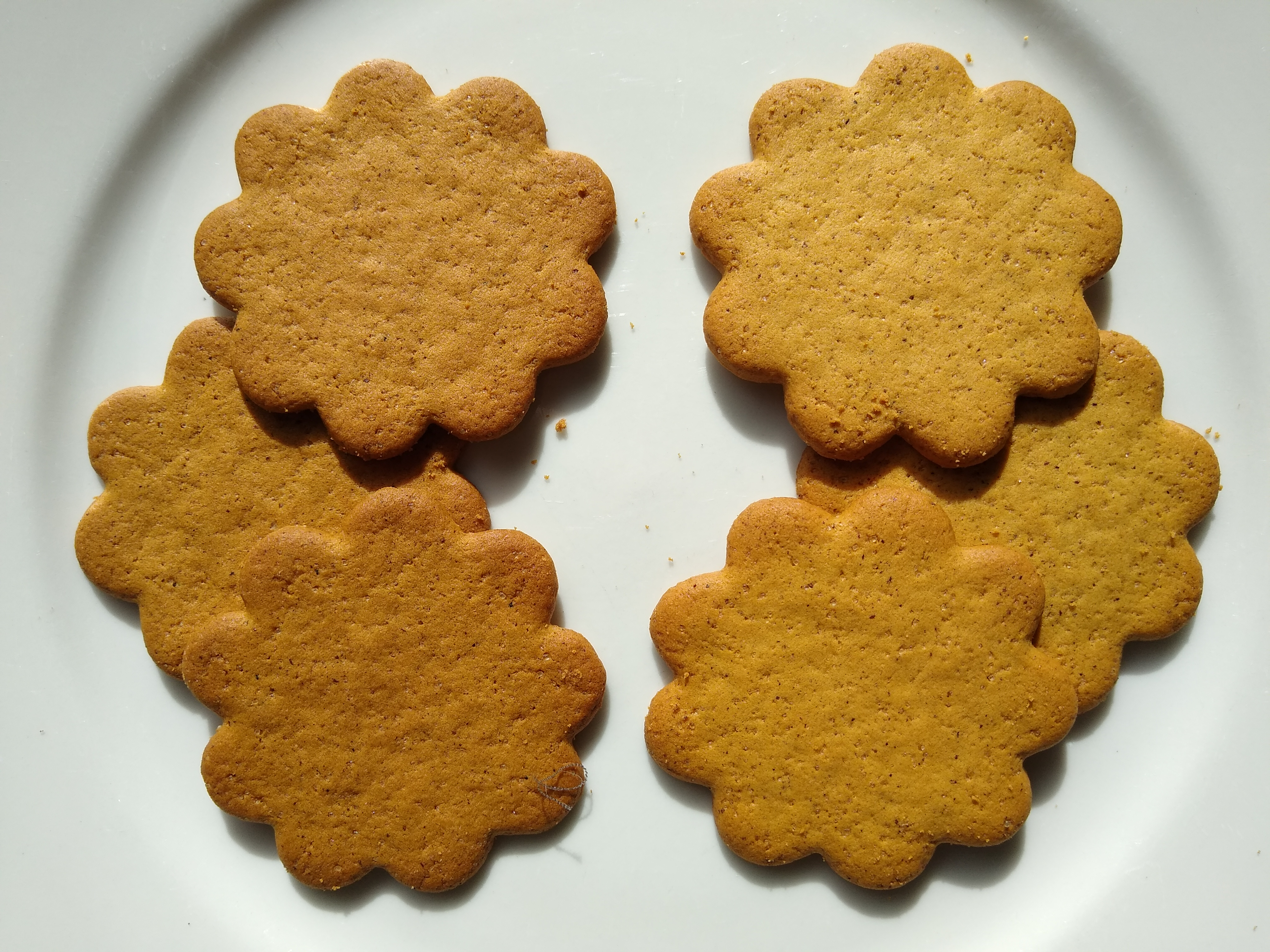
Anna's Ginger Thins (left) and Almond Thins (right)

Anna's Swedish Thins or (in Swedish) Annas Pepparkakor is a brand of Swedish ginger thin. It is produced by the Swedish company AB Annas Pepparkakor in Tyresö outside Stockholm. The thins are marketed as being under Royal Warrant to the King of Sweden.

== History ==
The company was founded by the sisters Anna and Emma Karlsson in 1929 and was owned by the Mattsson family from 1963 to 2008. The company was appointed Purveyor to the Royal Court of Sweden (kunglig hovleverantör) in 2002.

In November 2008, it was announced that the Belgian company Lotus Bakeries was taking over the company, with the intention of distributing the famous cookies all over Europe.

== Distribution ==
The ginger thins are available in supermarkets all over Sweden, exported to other countries in Europe, Middle East, and North America. In North America, from 2002 to 2011, the company Anna's of North America had a bakery in High River, 50 kilometres (31 mi) south of Calgary in Alberta, Canada, and sold the biscuits under the brand name Anna's Swedish Thins. The thins are exported to more than 20 countries including Germany and the United Kingdom. In 2025, 35% of the annual production of more than 2,000 tonnes is exported overall.

== Types ==
The thins are available in ginger flavour as standard but alternative flavours have been issued on an annual basis. Production has been extended to various flavours beside the traditional Swedish ginger flavour, including orange and blueberry.

== Folklore ==
“Anna's Thins are also known as "Swedish wish cookies." To make a wish, place a cookie on the palm of your hand and tap it gently with your index finger. If it breaks into three pieces, your wish will come true.”
