= Children's clothing =

Clothing worn by children

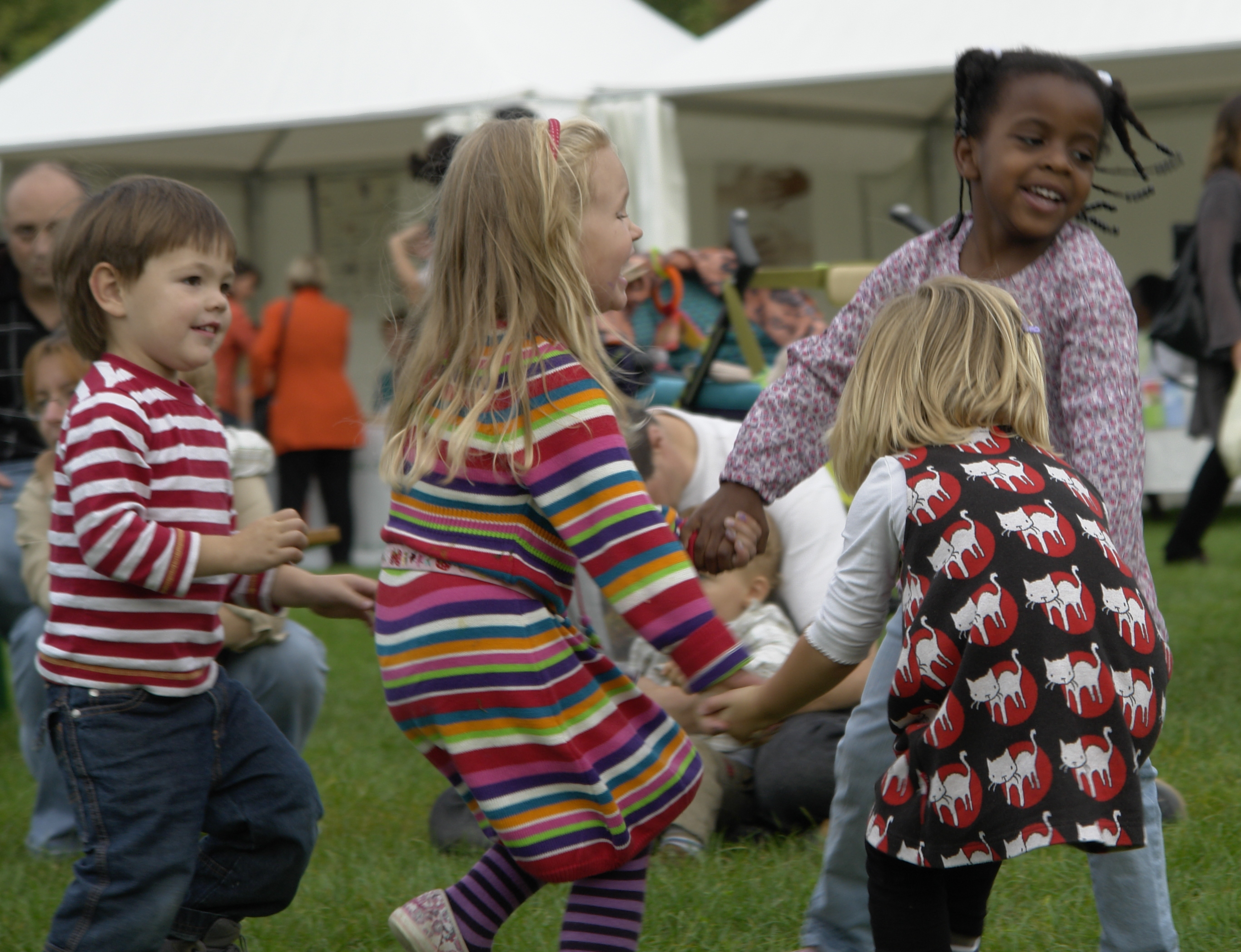
Children's clothing needs to be useful for playing.

Children's clothing or kids' clothing is clothing for children who have not yet grown to full height. Children's clothing is often more casual than adult clothing, fit for play and rest.

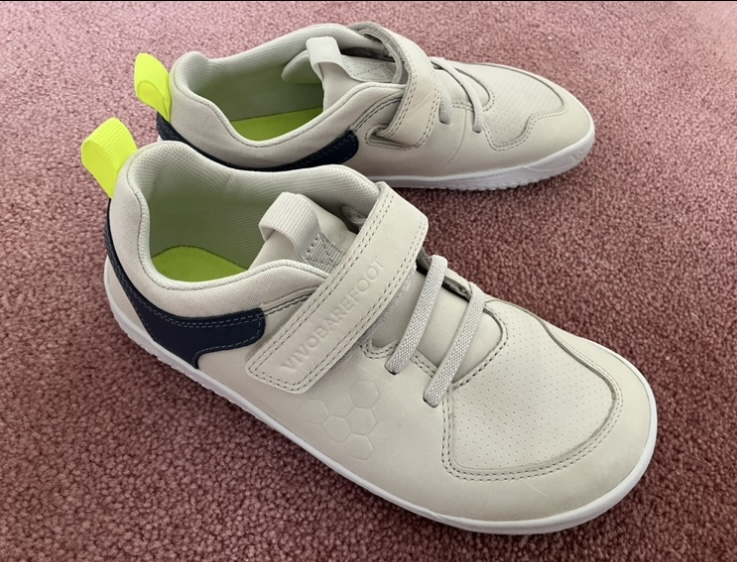
A pair of children's sneakers.

In the early 21st century, however, childrenswear became heavily influenced by trends in adult fashion. Grandma bait is a retail industry term for expensive children's clothing. Due to the rise of social media platforms such as Instagram, celebrities and fashion bloggers have been using their accounts to post pictures of their children wearing luxury "street style" clothing, thus inspiring parents to dress their children as they would dress themselves. Good quality, well-designed garments are a priority for some parents, and children's clothing is getting a prime place in top-label stores and high-end fashion retail outlets. Clothes are also getting separately designed for boys and girls at a very early age.

== History ==
Childhood is distinct from certain parameters in all societies, from infancy to adolescence; societal expectations about children's abilities, limitations, and how they look are present at all stages of their development. In every era, clothing plays an important role in the "look" of childhood. An overview of the history of children's clothing reveals changes.

=== Early children's clothing ===
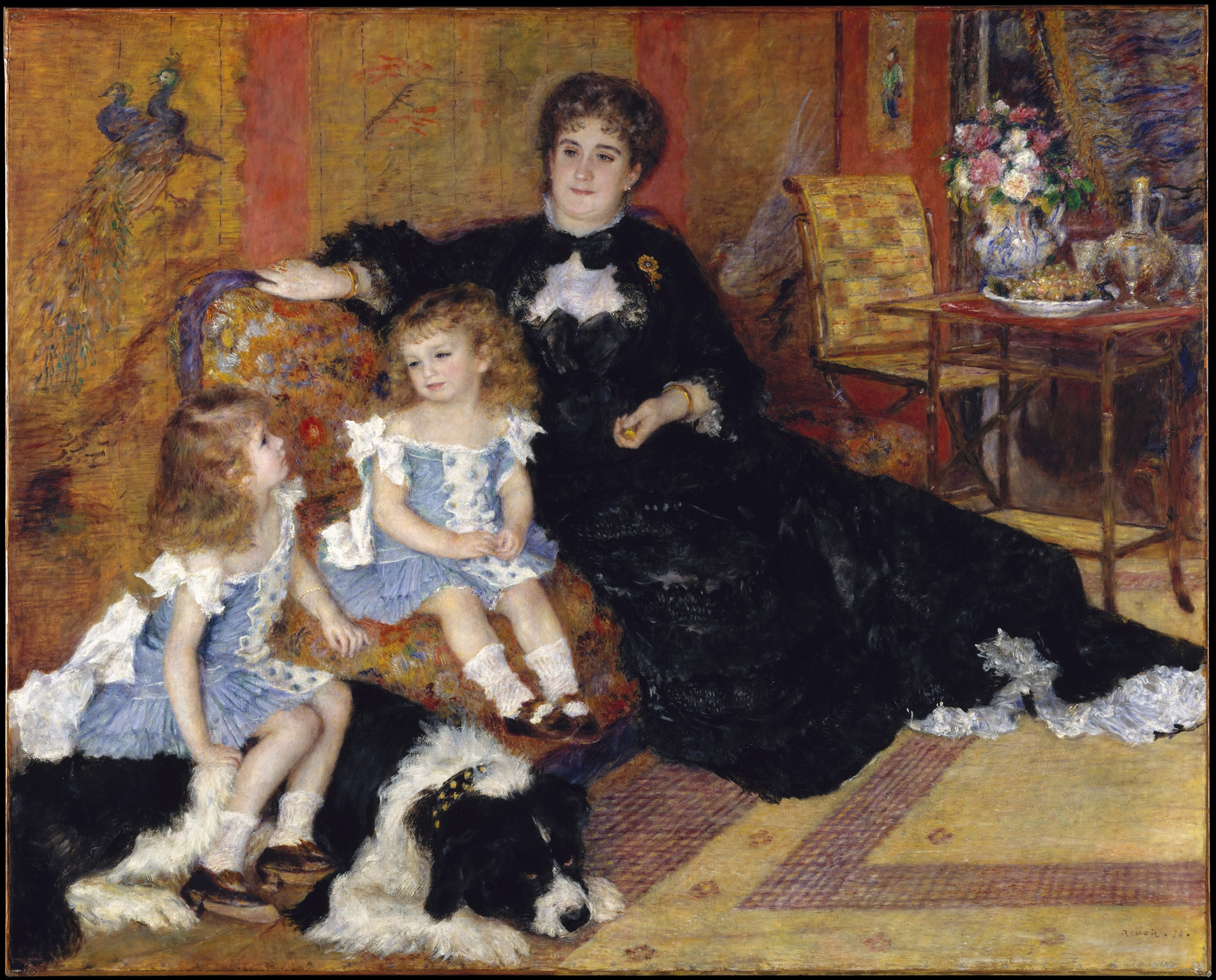
Identically dressed daughter and son in an elegant Parisian home (1878)

Children, regardless of gender, shared styles and cuts before the twentieth century. From the sixteenth to the twentieth centuries, both men and women wore gowns, tunics, and robes. The gown became a thing for women, newborns, and toddlers only after men's attire evolved into two-piece clothes, shirts, and breeches. Children's styles evolved from gowns to adult garments as they grew older.

=== Gowns for women and babies ===
Swaddling was popular for a short period, but ankle-length white frocks and slip skirts for babies and crawling toddlers were popular around the 1500s since women wore ultra-fine muslin and chemise dresses in the 1700s, which looked remarkably similar to the attire worn by young children since the middle of the century. Children's gowns were given additional accessories like waist belts as kid's fashion grew.

Another look that gave the ideal example of women's neoclassical fashion was this one. Most women, girls, and toddler boys wore garments made of lightweight fabrics like silk or cotton during the 1800s.

=== Girls' dresses ===
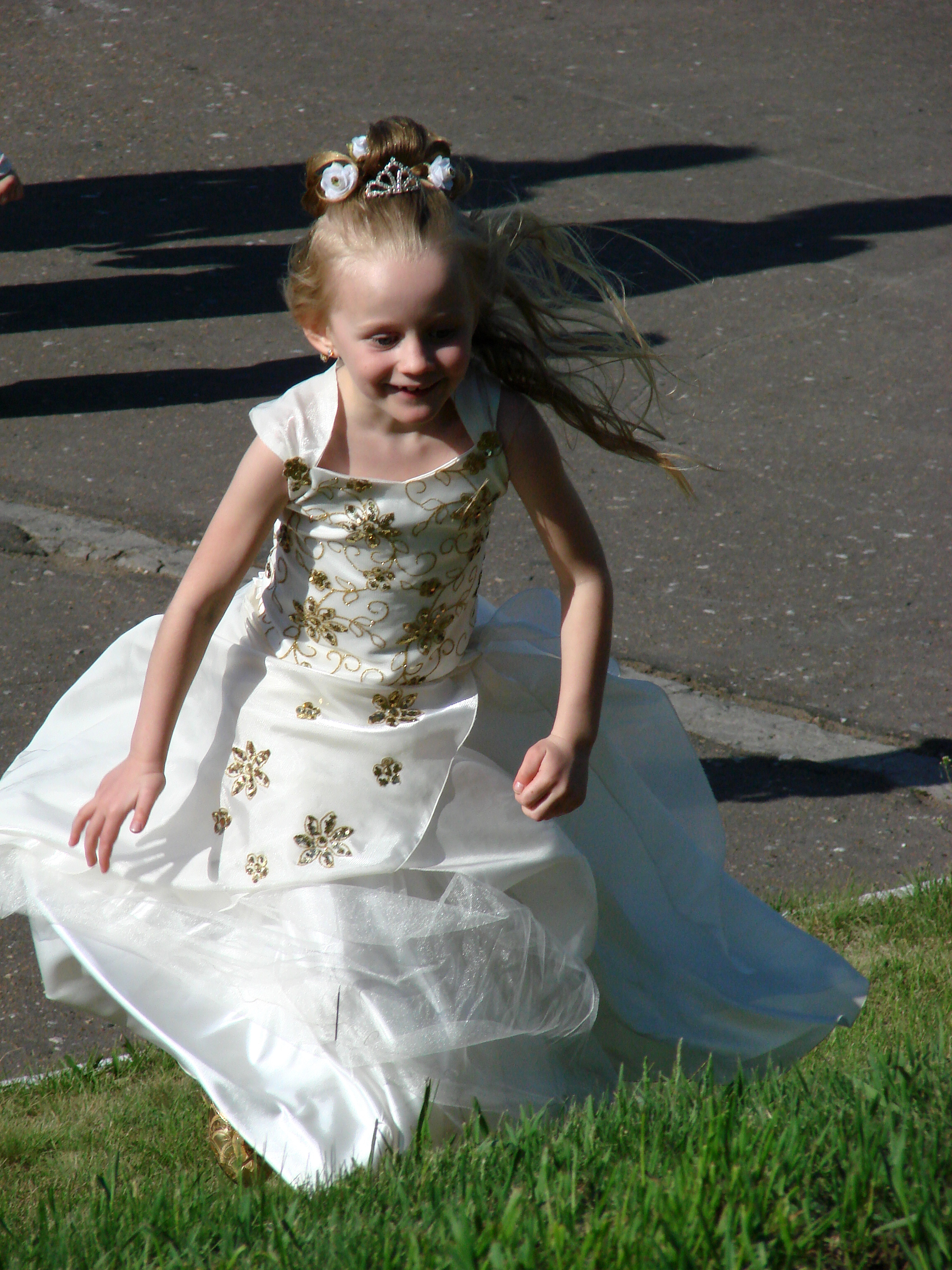
A girl in a dress.

While men's clothes changed dramatically as they grew older in the nineteenth century, girls' dresses stayed relatively unchanged. Women's attire did not alter much in terms of cut or stylistic detail, from their birth robes to the skirted outfits they wore their entire lives. The fundamental distinction between children's and women's fashion was that the length of the dress steadily increased, eventually reaching the floor by mid-adolescence.

== Function ==
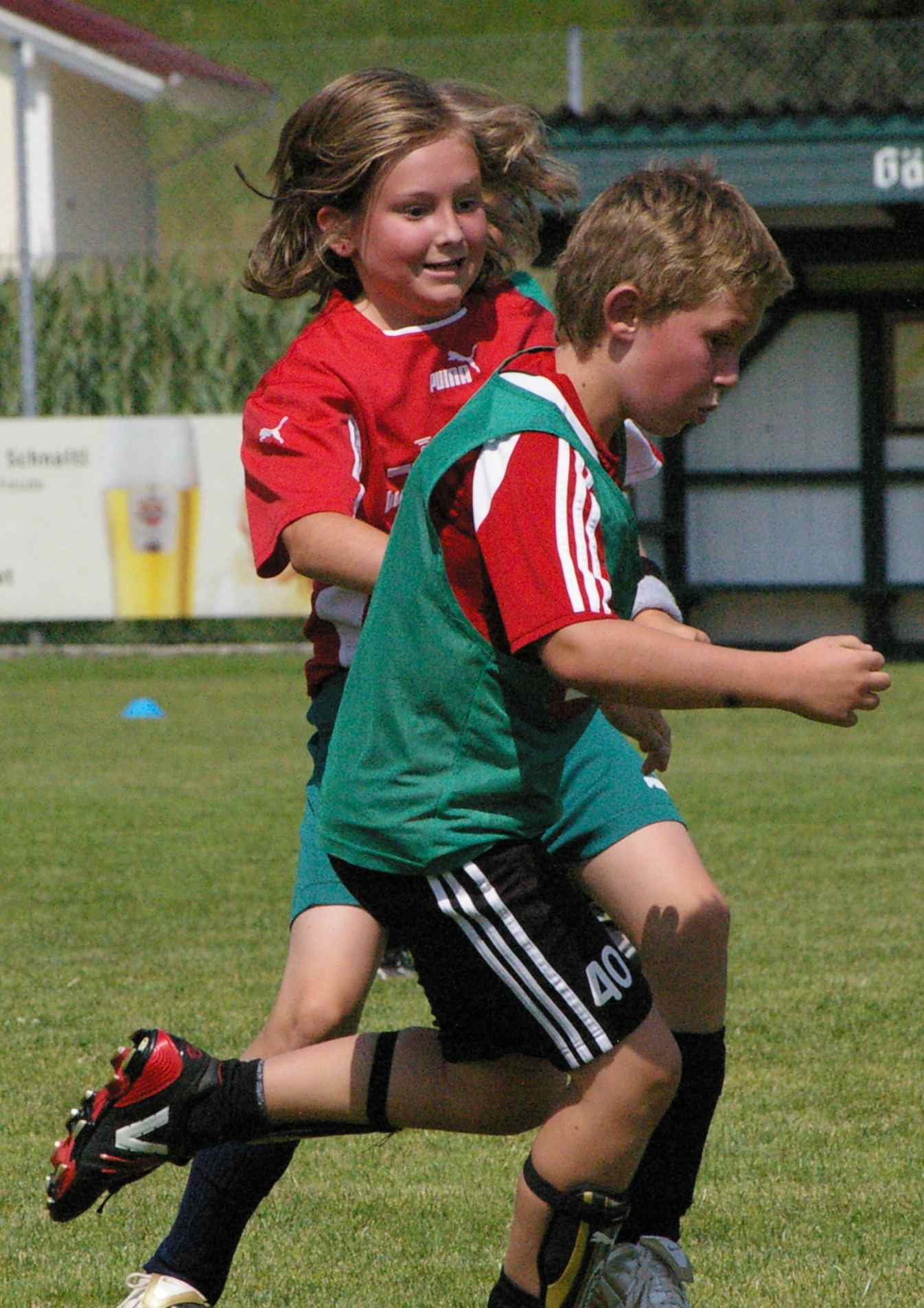
Children's clothing includes sports uniforms, which allow the children move freely to play the game, as well as to show which team each player belongs to

Function and design must meet at the right proportions in children's clothes for them to be popular and accepted. Fabric choices, openings and fastenings, fit and ease, and trimmings used are all major considerations when designing children's wear. Some other factors a designer designing for children's clothing should focus on are the changing shape of the growing kid and different proportions of the different parts of the body.

Leisurewear and sportswear are two very prominent design styles in children's clothing.

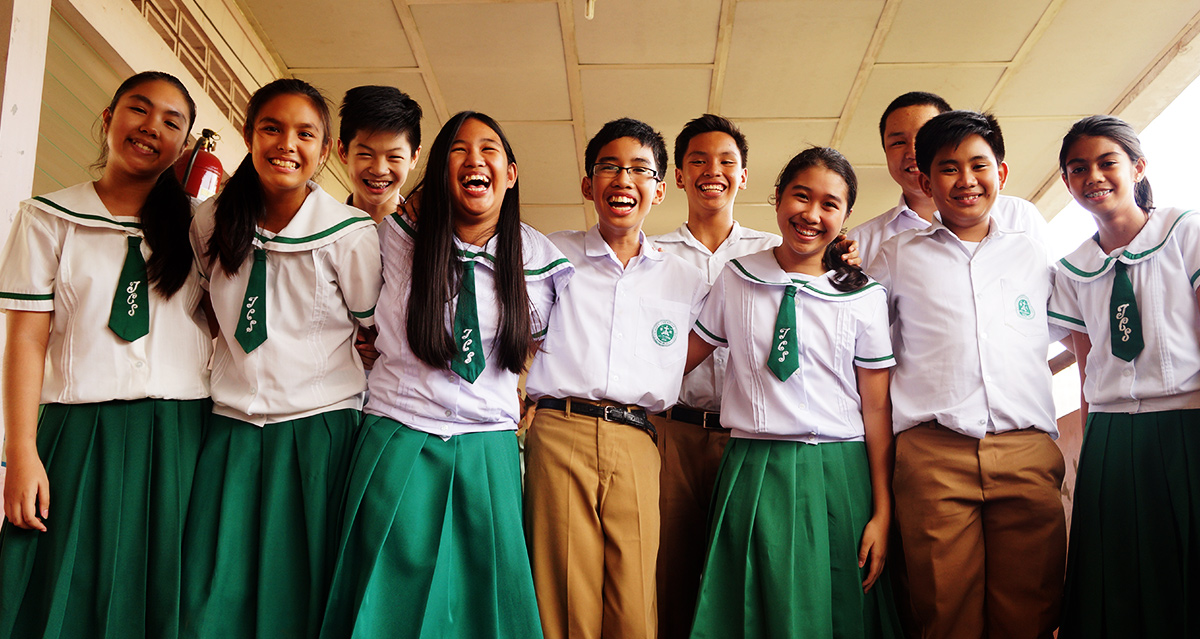
School uniforms are common around the world.

School uniforms are another type of specialized clothes for children.

== Sizes ==
American sizes for baby clothes are usually based on the child's weight. European sizes are usually based on the child's height. These may be expressed as an estimated age of the child, e.g., size 6 months (or 3–6 months) is expected to fit a child 61 to 67 centimetres (24 to 26 in) in height and 5.7 to 7.5 kilograms (13 to 17 lb) in weight.

Children's clothing is also sometimes worn by adults who are very short.

== Children's clothing and gender ==
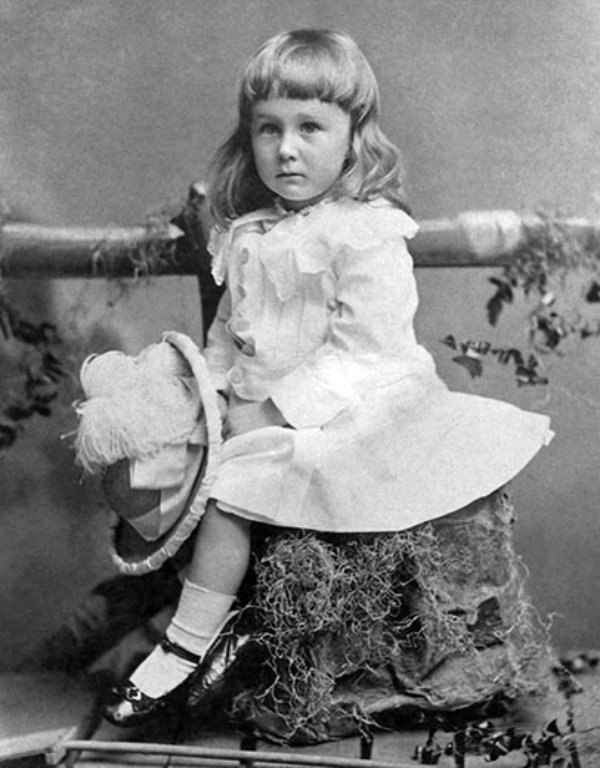
Like most children in the late 19th century, when he was a toddler, the future US president, Franklin D. Roosevelt, wore white dresses.

Gender-specific clothing for young children was rare throughout most of history, for purely practical reasons. This included both the type of clothing and the color. Before birth, the parents did not know whether the baby would be a boy or girl; white clothes were easier to clean; and less clothing was needed, since all of it could be used for any baby, instead of parents feeling like they should buy or make a full set of pink dresses for one baby and then a full set of blue overalls for the next baby.

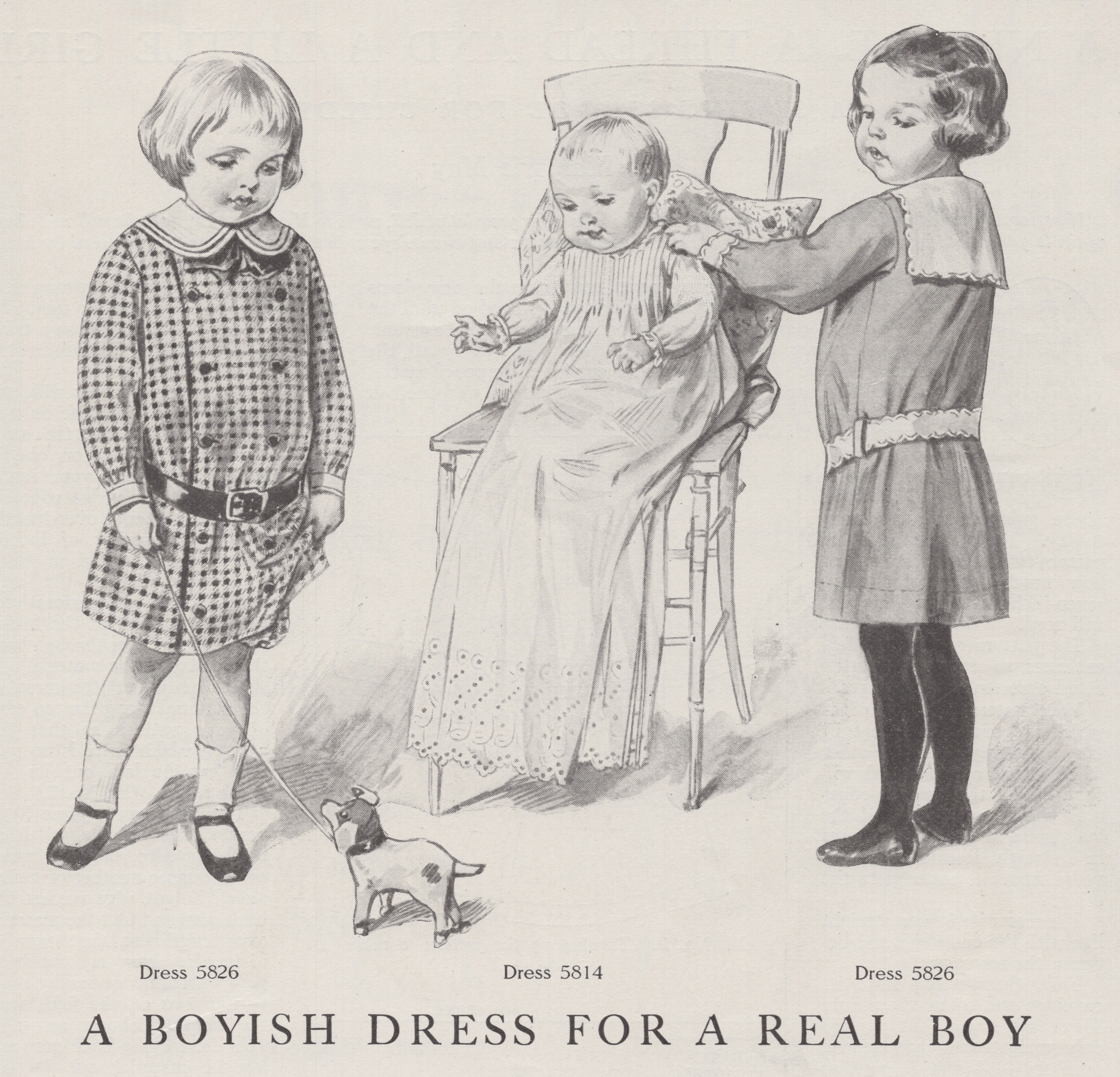
1912 advertisement for boy's clothing was titled "A Boyish Dress for a Real Boy".

Before the 1940s, young boys and girls alike wore short dresses. In the US, during the 1940s and 1950s, boys were dressed like their fathers, which meant shirts and trousers and the same colors that their fathers wore. From the mid-1960s through the mid-1980s, the fashion for American girls was unisex clothing, such as jeans and T-shirts. Thus American fashion transitioned from having both boys and girls frequently wear dresses in the 19th century to having neither always wearing dresses by the 1970s.

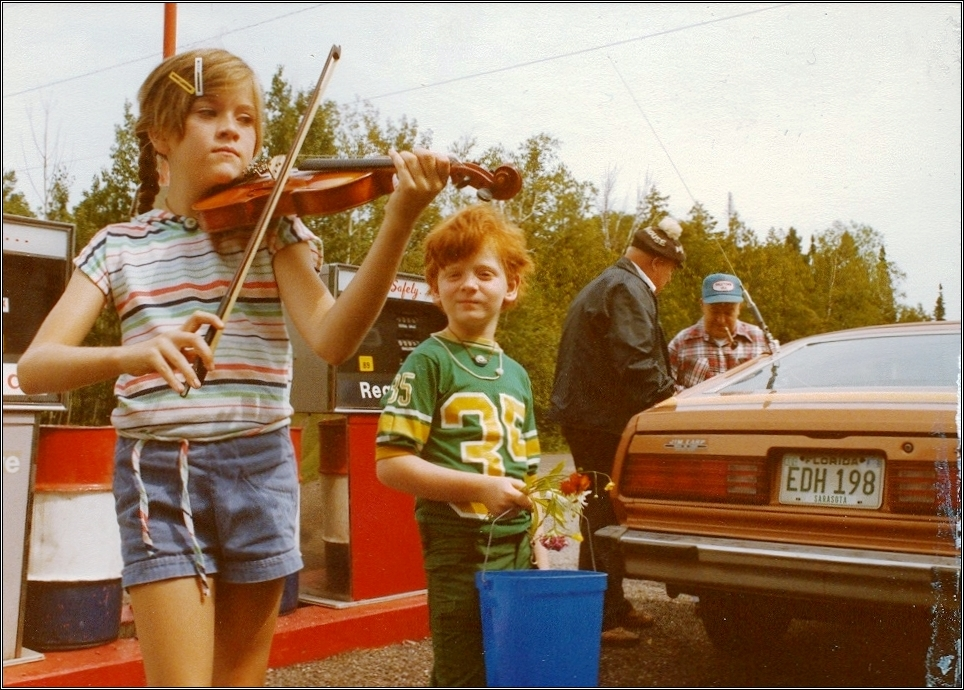
In the 1970s, girls and boys could wear similar styles of clothes. Feminine frills were not fashionable.

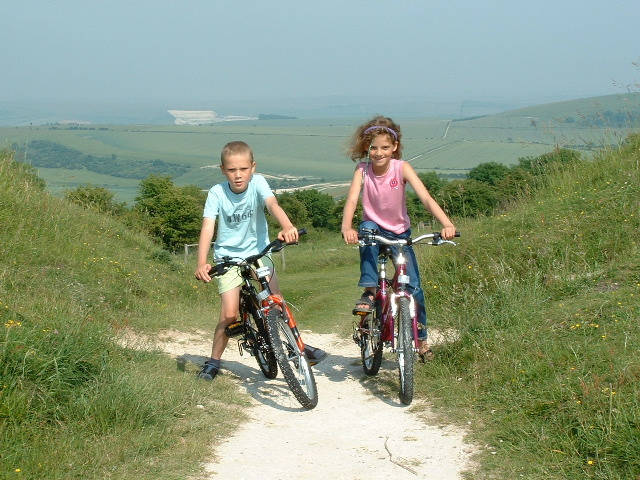
This boy wears a blue shirt and shorts. This girl wears a pink shirt and jeans.

Gender-specific colors emerged in the middle of the 20th century. Clothing was expensive, and white clothes could be bleached when they became dirty. Consequently, colored clothes were not used for babies until the Victorian era, and at that time, any child could be dressed in any color. The color code of using pink primarily for girls' clothes and blue primarily for boys' clothes did not appear until the 1940s onwards. In fact, in the first part of the 20th century, light blue clothes were recommended for American girls, as being the more "delicate and dainty" color, and pink was recommended for boys because it was the "stronger color". Other color-coding schemes recommended that the colors be selected to coordinate with the child's hair or eye color, with blue being recommended for blond hair or blue eyes.

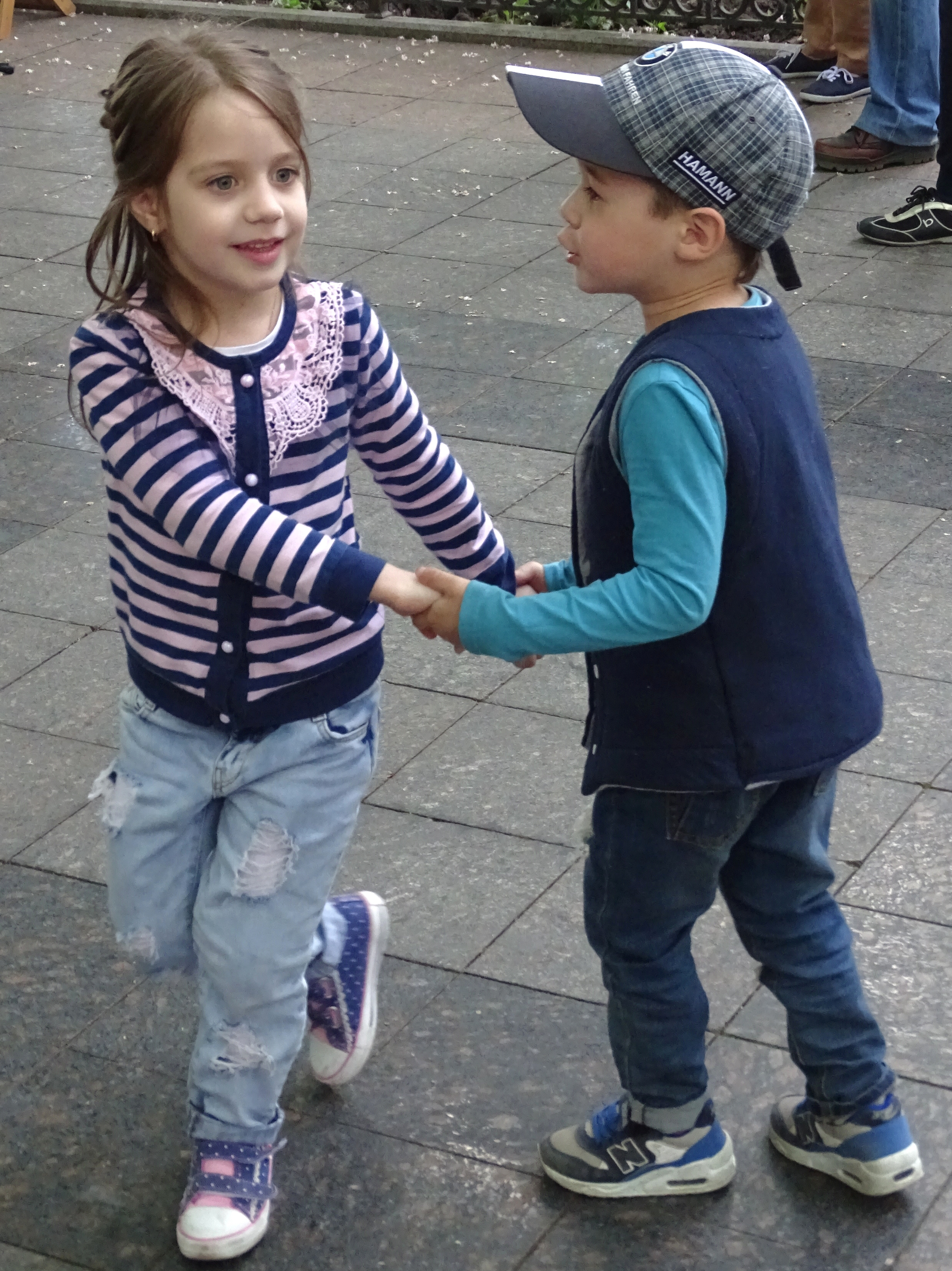
A boy and a girl, both wearing jeans, knit shirts, and sneakers

Children's clothing in the English-speaking world has become increasingly segregated, with young girls especially being expected to wear pink. Peggy Orenstein writes in her book, Cinderella Ate My Daughter, that pink-coloured and princess-themed clothes are almost ubiquitous for young girls in shops in the United States. She sees this as problematic because it limits girls to not only one colour, but also to one spectrum of experience, and it "firmly fuses girls' identity to appearance." In reaction to this situation, a campaign group Pinkstinks was formed in the UK in 2008 to raise awareness of the gender stereotyping of children. Further, clothing companies have started to sell clothes that are unisex or gender-neutral, such as the Swedish company Polarn O. Pyret, while others have been founded specifically to offer such items, such as Tootsa MacGinty.

== See also ==
- Infant clothing
- Lolita fashion
- Sailor suit
- Youth culture
