= Tootsa MacGinty =

Clothing company focused on kids clothing

- The Tootsa MacGinty logo
- Type: Private
- Industry: Retail
- Founder: Kate Pietrasik
- Headquarters: London, UK
- Area served: UK and Ireland, USA, France, Russia, Italy, and Australia
- Key people: Dan Shaw
- Products: Children's clothes
- Owner: Inc Retail
- Number of employees: 4
- Parent: Inc & Co
- Website: tootsamacginty.com

Tootsa MacGinty is a clothing company that makes unisex clothes for children between the ages of 0 and 8.

== History ==
The company was started by womenswear designer Kate Pietrasik in 2011. It is one of the first to bring unisex kidswear to the market in the UK. In 2013 the company introduced its first adult item, in response to enquiries.

Pietrasik had previously worked designing streetwear and sportswear for brands including Hilfiger and Roxy. The company currently consists of Pietrasik, her two parents, and a PR and Brand Manager. She says she was inspired to create unisex children's clothing after being shocked by the gender segregated children's clothing available in the UK High Street, after having lived in France for 10 years where the situation was less pronounced.

Tootsa MacGinty manufactures its clothes in Portugal.

== Collaboration ==
The company has collaborated with UK environmental campaign group, Surfers Against Sewage, to produce a series of fundraising T-shirts.

Beyond using social media, trade fairs and word-of-mouth marketing, the company doesn't advertise.

In 2021, Tootsa was purchased by Inc Retail, which is part of Inc & Co.
