= Svenskt Tenn =

Swedish interior design store

- Company type: Interior design store
- Founded: 1924; 102 years ago
- Headquarters: Stockholm, Sweden
- Key people: Maria Veerasamy (CEO); Karl Johan Anders Wall (Chairman)
- Products: Interior Design
- Number of employees: 92
- Website: www.svenskttenn.com

Svenskt Tenn ("Swedish Pewter") is a Swedish interior design company, founded in 1924 in Stockholm by Estrid Ericson, an art teacher and pewter artist from Hjo, Sweden. Since 1928, the company has been appointed as a royal warrant. Since 1975, it is owned by the Kjell and Märta Beijer Foundation and all surplus generated is donated to research in areas such as environmental sustainability, genetics, biomedicine and pharmaceuticals. The brand’s only physical retail space is located on Strandvägen 5 in Stockholm.

== History ==
=== 1924–1999 ===
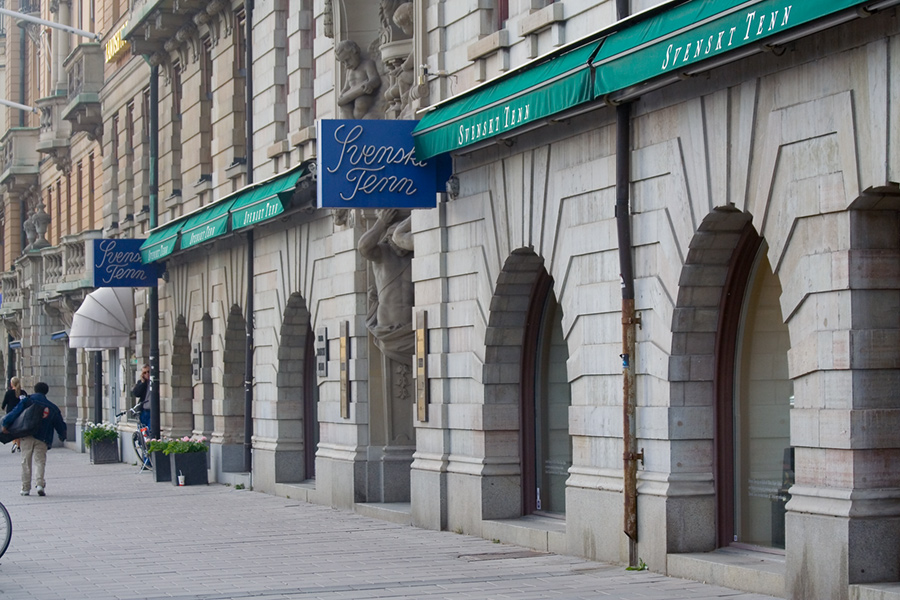
Storefront with tea salon as part of the building complex Kvarteret Bodarna in Stockholm.

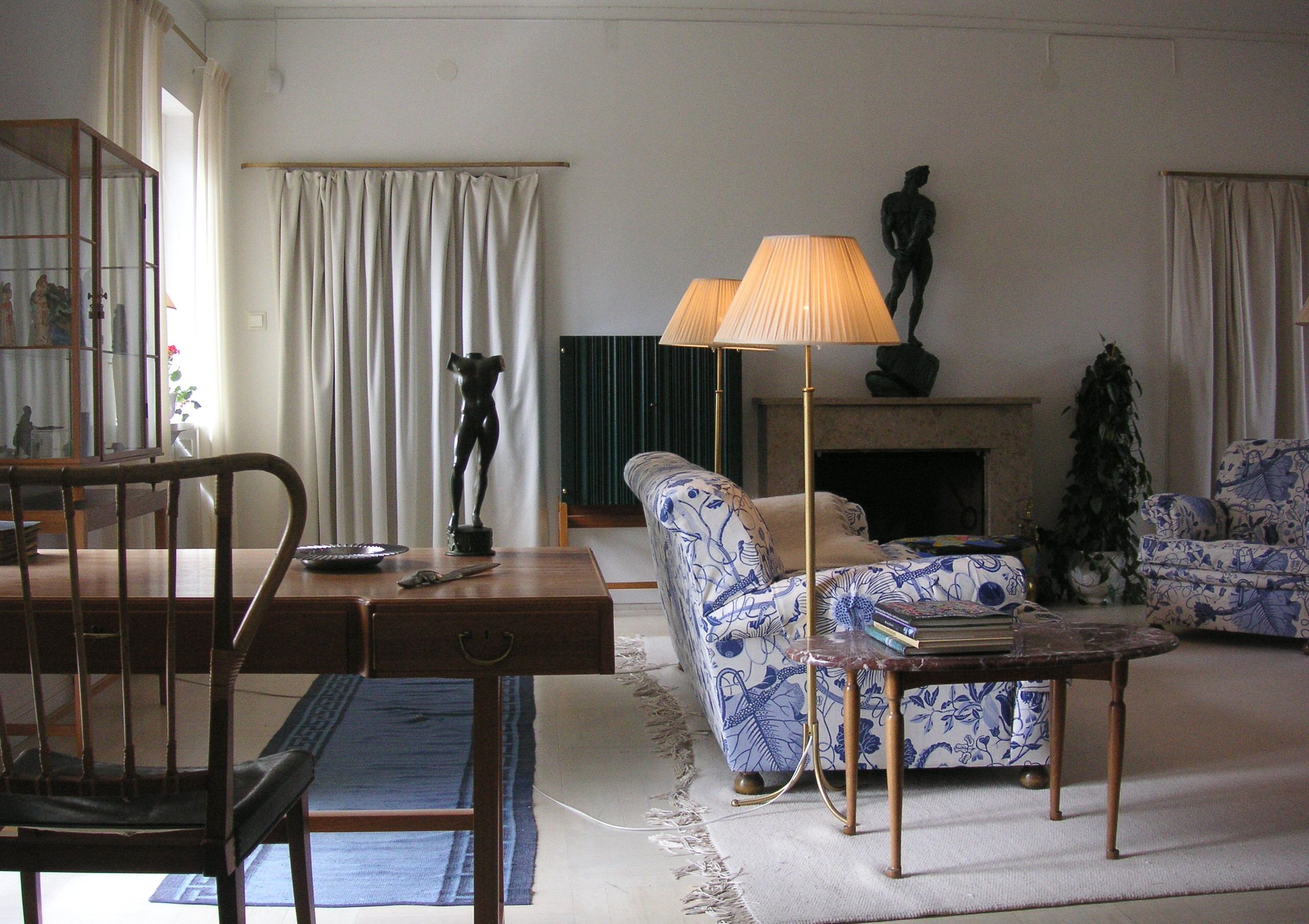
A living room, designed by Ericson and Frank, situated in the curator's building, called Annes Hus, which was built and constructed by Evert Milles in Stockholm's Millesgården on the island of Lidingö.

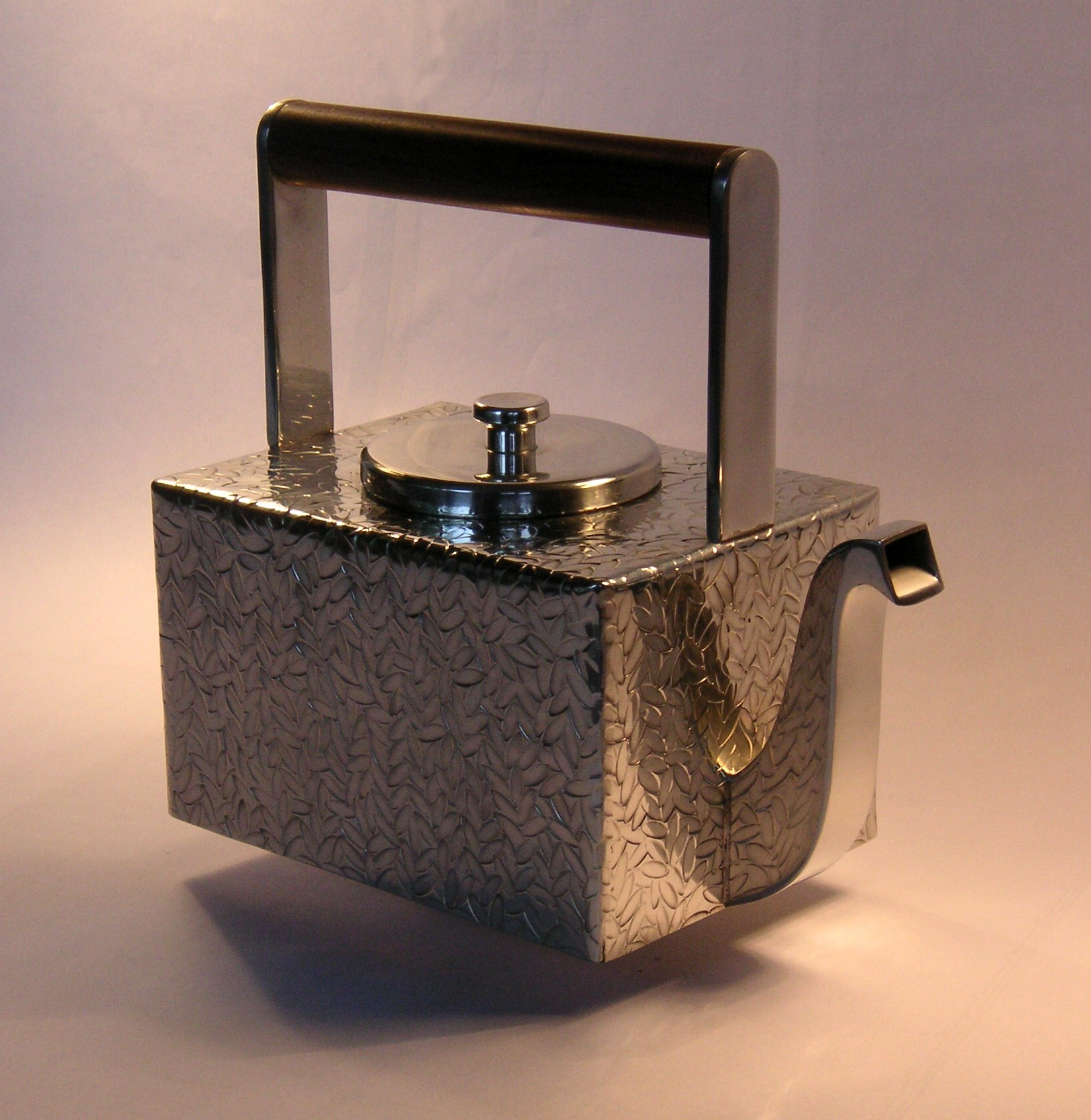
A teapot, designed in 2004 by Signe Persson-Melin on the occasion of the 80th birthday of Svenskt Tenn and in memory of Estrid Ericson.

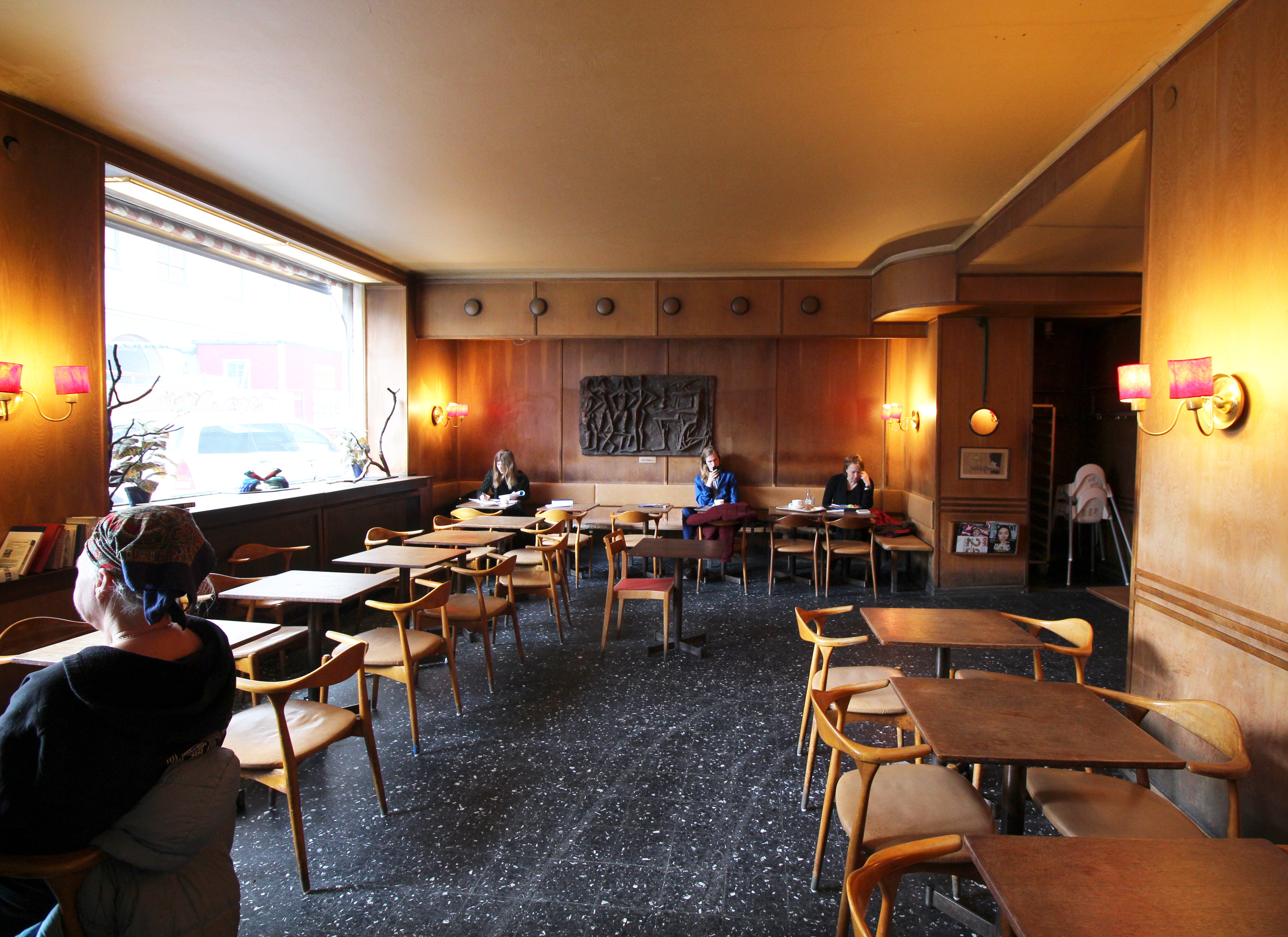
Wall lights by Svenskt Tenn in the pastry shop Valand on Surbrunnsgatan 48 in Norrmalm.

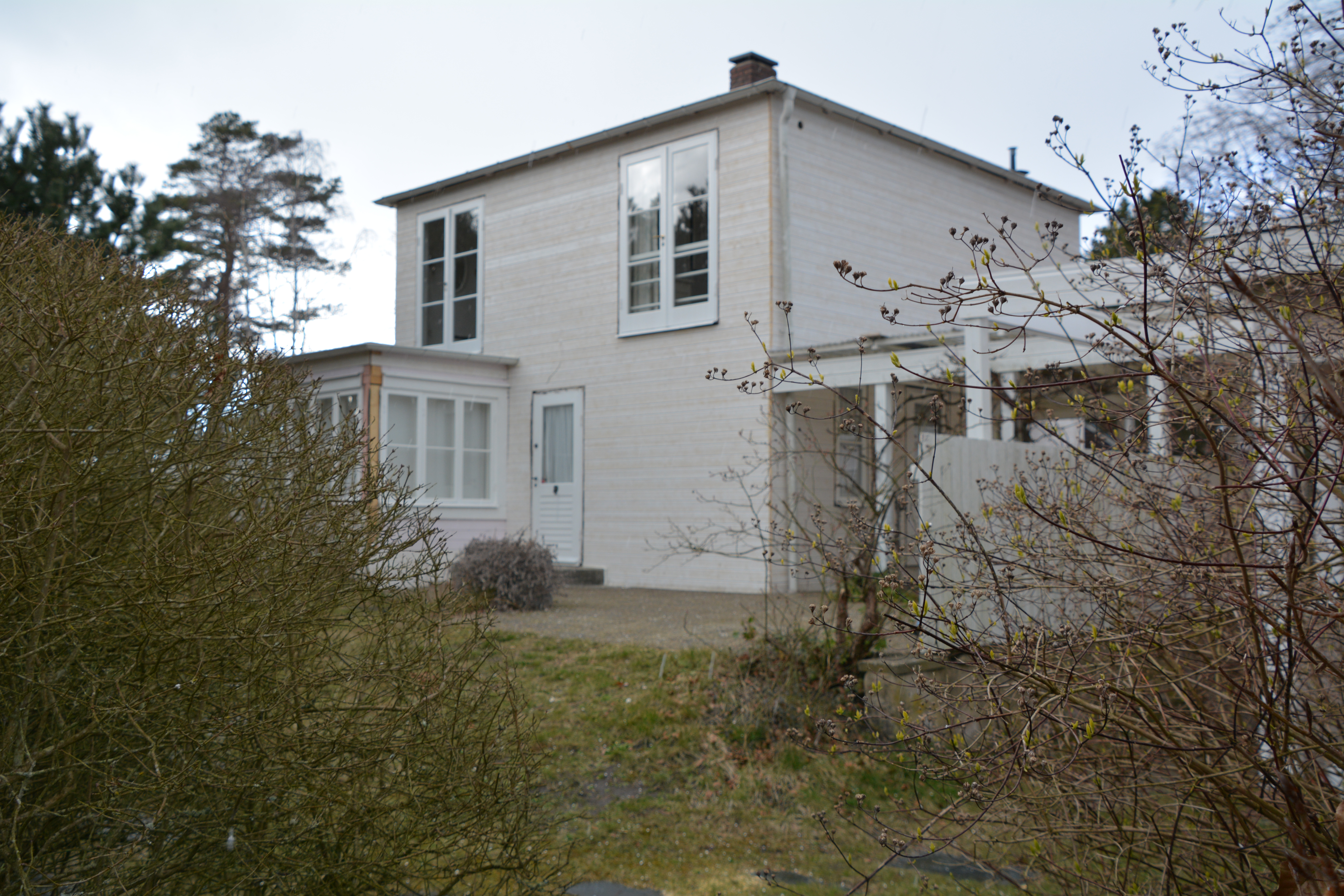
Frank's Villa Carlsten at Fyrvägen 26 in Falsterbo, Skåne.

Ericson's father's inheritance served as seed capital for starting the company. With pewter artist Nils Fougstedt as a close colleague, Estrid Ericson produced modern pewter objects and thus Svenskt Tenn quickly gained recognition as a brand of quality, eventually leading to a gold medal at the 1925 Exposition des Arts Décoratifs et Industriels in Paris. Further successes in the USA were following, beginning in 1927 with an exhibition of Swedish design at the Metropolitan Museum of Art in New York that also toured to Chicago and Detroit. As a result of her success, in 1927, the store moved from Smålandsgatan to larger premises on Strandvägen, where it is still located today.

At that time, the Swedish functionalist architects Uno Åhrén and Björn Trägårdh started to design for the company. In 1932, Ericson ordered the first furniture designs from the already well-established Austrian architect Josef Frank. Two years later, she hired Frank after he fled the burgeoning Nazism in Austria for Sweden at the age of 50 together with his Swedish wife Anna.

Svenskt Tenn's exhibition room at the world exhibitions in Paris (“Exposition des Arts et Techniques dans la Vie Moderne”) in 1937 and New York in 1939 was completely contrary to the ideal of the time with its bold contrasts in materials, colours and prints. The duo of Frank and Ericson received a great deal of attention and were quickly associated with the expression “Swedish Modern”.

Over time, the designer duo won many notable clients. In 1932, Sigvard Oskar Bernadotte commissioned Svenskt Tenn for a new interior design of his residence. Similarly, Ericson and Frank were commissioned to design the house of Anne Hedmark (Annes Hus) on the site of the Swedish sculptor Carl Milles’s studio and home.

During the Second World War, Josef Frank was forced into exile yet again. At the height of the war he fled to Manhattan, resulting in a number of new textile designs between 1941 and 1946. Sweden’s Prince Eugen was among those who took a great delight in them; he felt that the new designs actually exceeded those of the legendary print designer and Frank role model, William Morris.

Estrid Ericson and Josef Frank jointly developed the interior design philosophy that Svenskt Tenn remains well known for today. In 1939, Estrid Ericson published her own writing on interior design, a publication she dubbed ”Interior Catechism”. Josef Frank developed his own philosophy called ”Accidentism” – an idea of that ”we should design our surroundings as if they originated by chance. This, he considered to be true for cities as well as living rooms.

After Frank died in 1967, Ericson Ericson continued to run the daily operations of the business until 1975. At the age of 81, she sold the company to the Kjell and Märta Beijer Foundation, which provides research grants within ecology, medicine and the preservation of Swedish interior design tradition. Ericson, however, remained as the managing director of the company. In 1979, Ann Wall took over her role and transformed Svenskt Tenn into a profitable business by modernising the product range, administration and organization, as well as renewing the marketing concept. Collaborations with selected new designers, as well as art and design schools, were also established under her direction.

=== 1999 – today ===
After Wall’s retirement twenty years later, the Kjell and Märta Beijer Foundation established the Ann Wall Design Prize in her honor as a part of Svenskt Tenn’s new business concept, which was “to preserve the spirit of Estrid Ericson and Josef Frank in a modern form.” In that context, the foundation in 2015 bought Frank's residence Villa Carlsten in Falsterbo, a town located at the southwestern tip of Sweden in Vellinge Municipality in Skåne. Frank had also designed a number of summer houses in that area.

Today, eighty percent of Svenskt Tenn's range consists of products that are of its own design. Josef Frank alone left behind 2,000 furniture sketches and more than 250 pattern designs. Alongside design by Josef Frank, Estrid Ericson and their contemporaries, Svenskt Tenn also collaborates with leading designers, architects and artist in the industry today. Recent collaborations have been made with Lars Nilsson, India Mahdavi, Margeritha Maccapani MIssoni, Alekos Fassianos Estate and Michael Anastassiades among others.

In 2009, Prince Carl Philip of Sweden debuted a silver cutlery collection at Svenskt Tenn. The following year, he presented a fireplace screen that he had co-designed.

Frank's designs are highly esteemed not the least among today's young and established designers and his textiles are a source of inspiration for many contemporary print designers both in Sweden and other countries. A famous fan of Frank is Apple designer Marc Newson. Many of Franks furniture designs can be found in Swedish embassies around the globe, such as in Algiers and even the Consulate General residence in New York.

At auction, Frank's and Ericson's designs fetch high prices and can be found in the collections of the Museum of Modern Art in New York (MoMA) and the National Museum of Stockholm. In 2022, auction house Bukowskis sold Josef Frank’s ”Apskåpet” (’The Monkey Cabinet’) for a record final price of SEK 4,625 000 – the highest price for a Swedish 20th-century furniture ever sold at auction.

In 2014, Svenskt Tenn initiated an annual design scholarship, given to a graduate student at Stockholm’s Beckmans College of Design. It is one of three collaborations between Svenskt Tenn and the school, alongside a glass-design scholarship and a returning interdisciplinary project in which Visual Communication students at Beckmans interpret research from the Beijer Institute of Ecological Economics.

In 2024, Svenskt Tenn celebrated 100 years. The jubilee was honoured with a series of archival reintroductions as well as an extensive jubilee exhibition at the Liljevalchs ‘kunsthalle’ in Stockholm. In 2025, Phaidon published the 400-page monograph Svenskt Tenn: Interiors, edited by Nina Stritzler-Levine. The book is the first extensive publication to ever be published about Svenskt Tenn.

== Craftsmanship ==
Inspired by the British Arts and Crafts designer William Morris, Ericson held the highest esteem for work that was crafted by hand. Today, large portion of Josef Frank's furniture is made at the same carpentry shops in the Stockholm area, Småland and Södermanland that have been producing them since the 1930s. The glass is made at, among other manufactories, the celebrated Reijmyre glassworks in Östergötland. All of Svenskt Tenn's textiles are made from 100 percent cotton and linen. The pewter workshops in Western Götaland in Sweden are also counted among Svenskt Tenn's long-time suppliers.
