= Economy class =

Tertiary travel class

Economy class, also called third class, coach class, steerage, or to distinguish it from the slightly more expensive premium economy class, standard economy class or budget economy class, is the lowest travel class of seating in air travel, rail travel, and sometimes ferry or maritime travel. Historically, this travel class has been called tourist class or third class on ocean liners.

== Marine ==
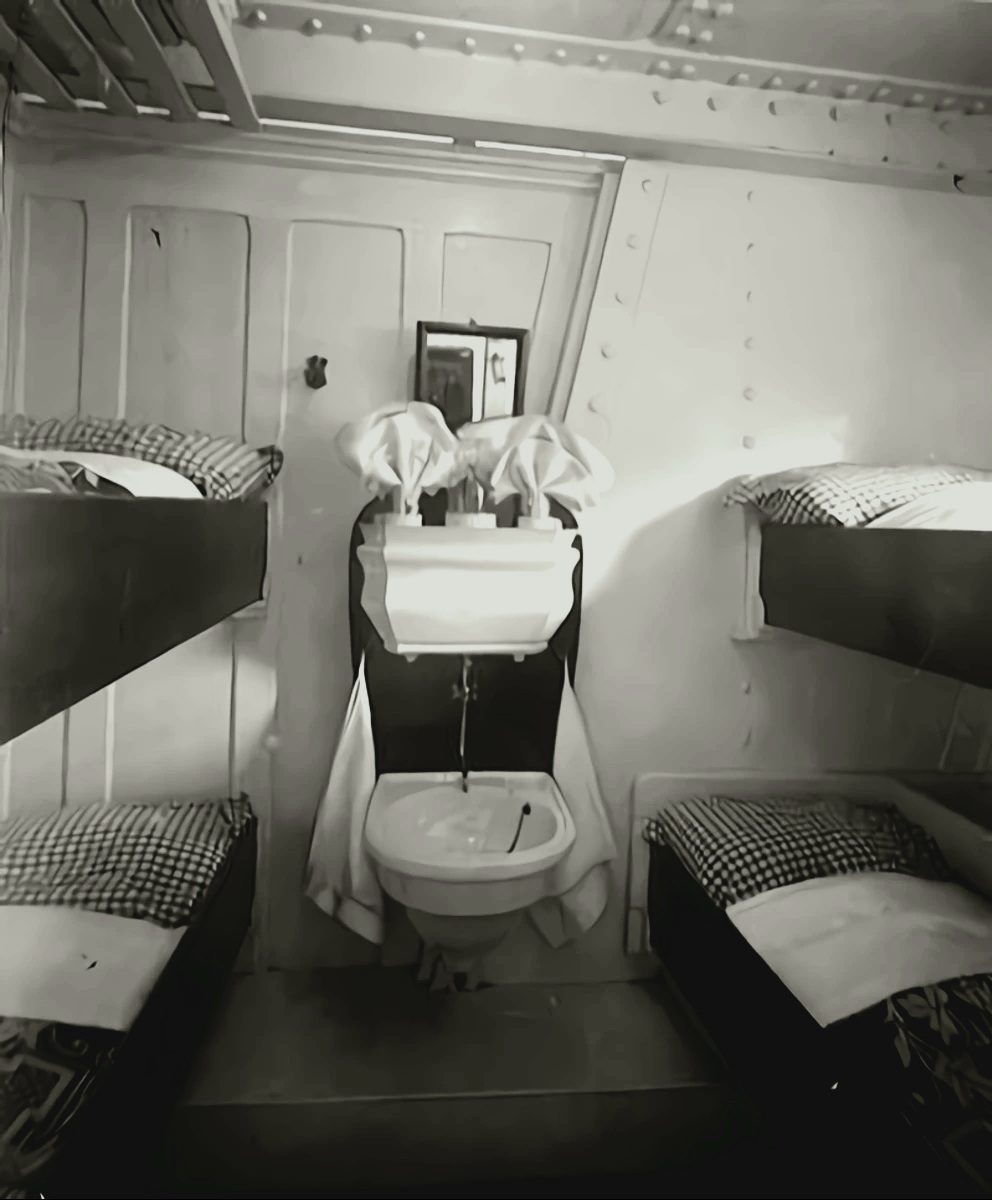
Third Class cabin aboard the RMS Olympic, Titanic's sister ship

Travel classes originated from a distinction between "cabin class" and "steerage" on sailing vessels in the 18th century. Cabin class for wealthier passengers included small cabins and a shared dining room, while "steerage" provided open decks with bunks, often near the tackle that operated the rudder or in converted cargo space on the "between decks" area, where poorer passengers cooked their own meals.

With the arrival of steamships, competition between ocean liner companies led some companies like the Inman Line to offer additional options to economy passengers seeking to immigrate including small shared cabins and regular meals which were termed "Third Class". Many large liners evolved three and sometimes four segregated cabin, dining and recreation spaces for First, Second, Third and Steerage Class passengers.

After immigrant travel dropped beginning in the 1920s, steerage class was abandoned and Third Class cabins were often upgraded, redecorated and offered to budget travellers as "Tourist Class". This became the main low budget class for ocean travel, gradually replacing Third Class especially during the boom in immigration after World War Two.

As ocean liners adjusted to the loss of passengers to air travel and switched to recreational cruising in the 1960s, most ships became "one class" to save on separate recreational and dining levels. However the evolution of the cruise ship led to a variety of premium services and exclusive dining areas. Many ferries operating on shorter routes have continued to offer cabin fares and large open accommodation for economy travellers similar to the cabin/steerage divisions of earlier eras.

== Railways ==
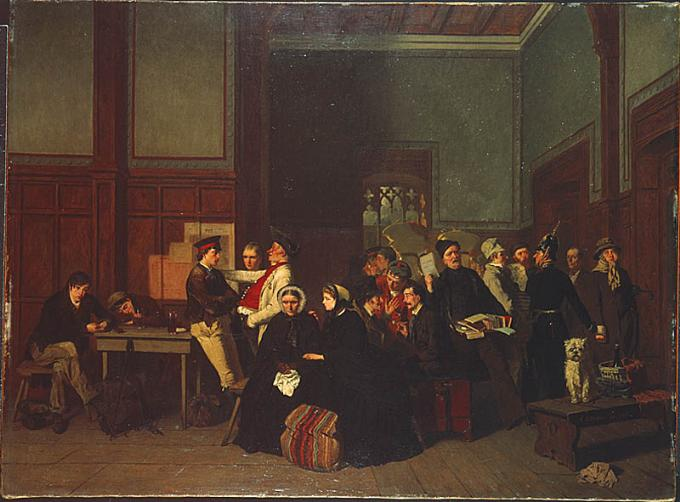
The Third-class waiting room, 1865 painting by Carl d'Unker

In North America, it is known as coach class by companies such as Amtrak. Most European railways call it second class, except in the United Kingdom and Ireland, where it is referred to as standard class (abbreviated "STD" on tickets) instead. It has been re-branded in some cases to broaden expectations. In Canada Via Rail refers to coach as economy class. In India, the lowest class of service was branded third class under the British colonial rule. It was re-branded as second class following independence to avoid its former segregationist connotations. Today Indian Railways offers Economy AC-3 also in the same class.

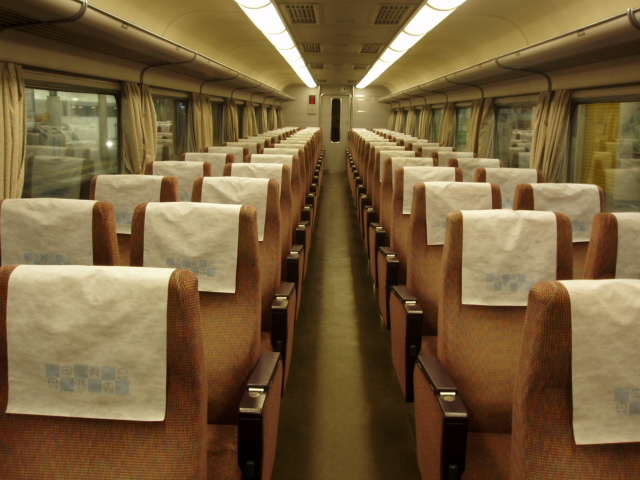
Economy class seats of Kintetsu 16000 series train (Japan)

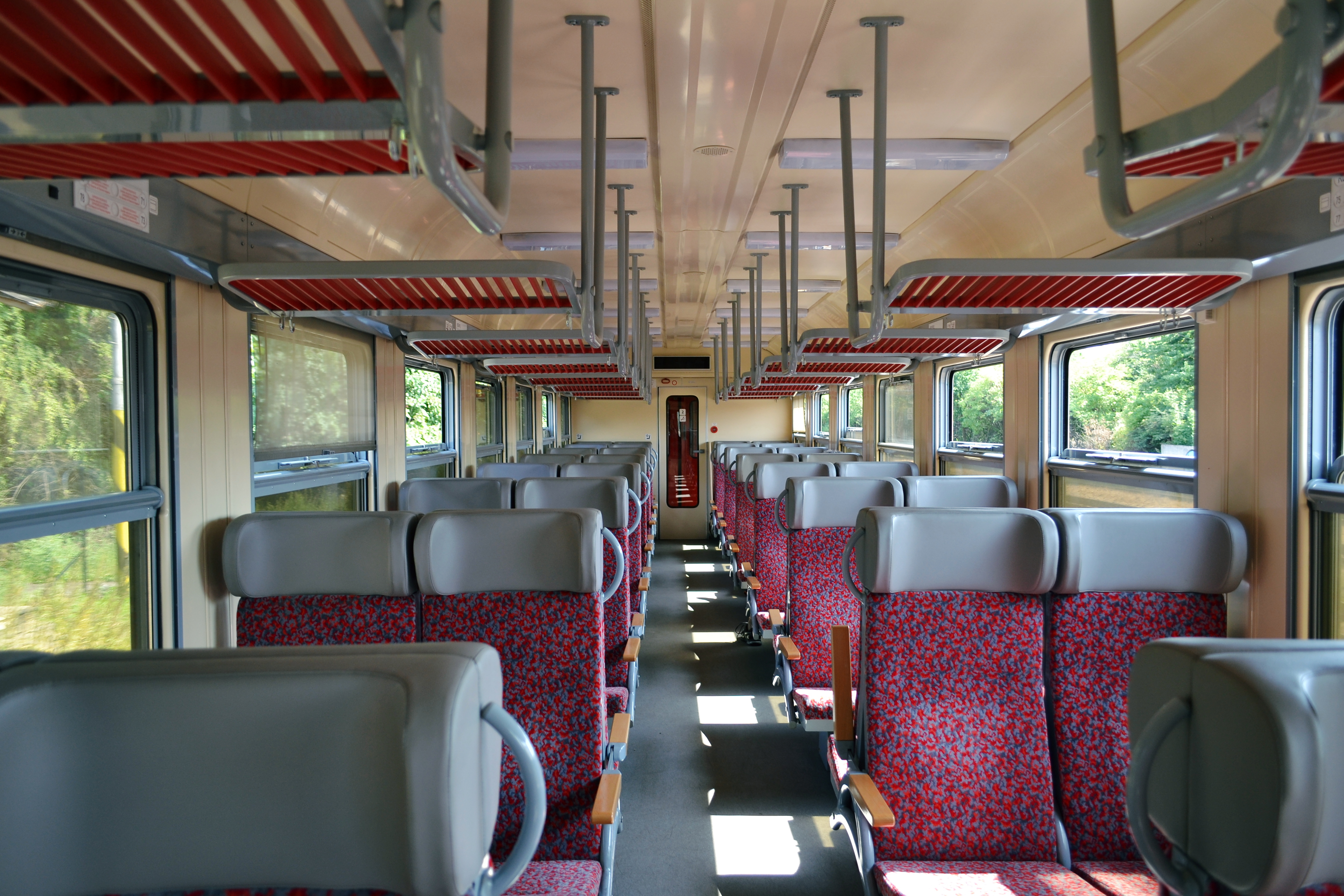
An economy class train operated by ČD

Generally economy class seats consists of a seat, sometimes with a fold-down tray, that may recline. The seat may also include a pocket attached to the back of the seat in front for storage of small items such as magazines. Depending on the configuration of the passenger compartment, luggage can be stowed in overhead racks or at each end of the coach cars. Historically the lowest travel class on rail often used wooden benches without upholstery as seating, hence the term "Holzklasse" ("wood class") in the German language for the lowest class of service, now colloquially used for air travel as well.

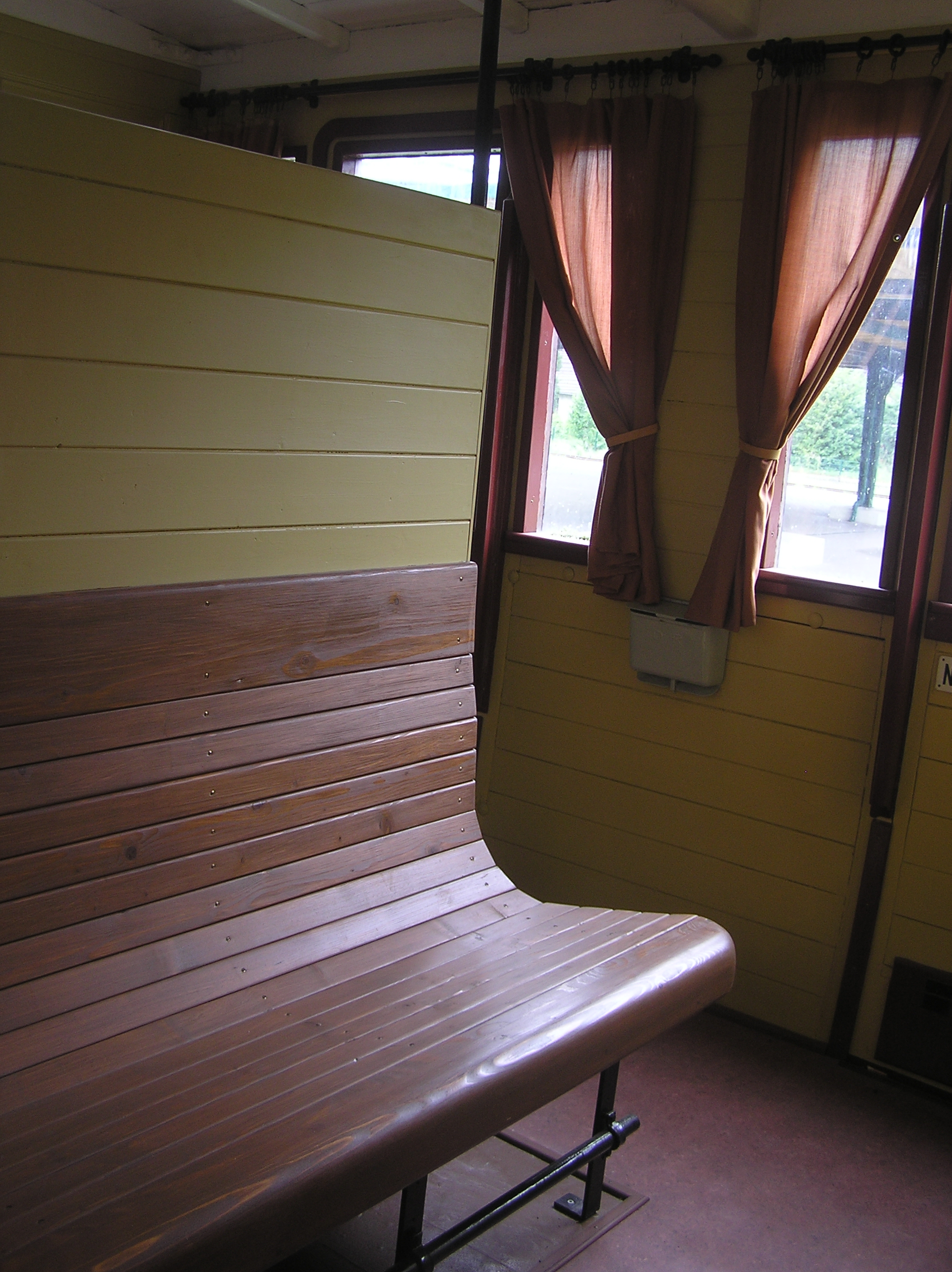
"Holzklasse" (third class) on a 19th-century Prussian Railways car

Standard class seating on British intercity trains often includes seating around permanent tables. Power sockets are available and some services offer (chargeable) Wi-Fi Internet access.

In continental Europe, second class mostly consists of open interior coaches with 2+2 seating arrangement, with or without air-conditioning, in rows or face to face, or (in some express trains) compartments of six to eight seats. Some commuter trains have a higher seating density, with 3+2 seating arrangement.

In Spain 2nd-class cabins are called Tourist class on the AVE superfast trains. They offer electric sockets and there are video and audio services on most major routes.

North American intercity passenger trains are separated into different coach classes by the type of car (e.g., sleepers). Economy seating on North American passenger trains typically does not include meal service in the fare.

Economy class also exists on some sleeper services, most notably on most Russian Railways routes, which designates the class as "Platzkart", with cars featuring an open 9-bay layout, where each bay has six bunk beds in two tiers – four transversally, and two longitudinally on the opposing side of the aisle, with the lower bunks functioning as seats in daytime. Several European railways also provide similar "coach class" sleeper cars, commonly dubbed Couchette cars. There is a debate, though, whether Platzkart class is a full tier down from the traditional second class/"coupe", or is just a cheaper variant, as there used to exist an even cheaper "hard bed" class with three-tier bunks and no bedding, which is long since discontinued in Russia, but is still employed in China.

== Airlines ==
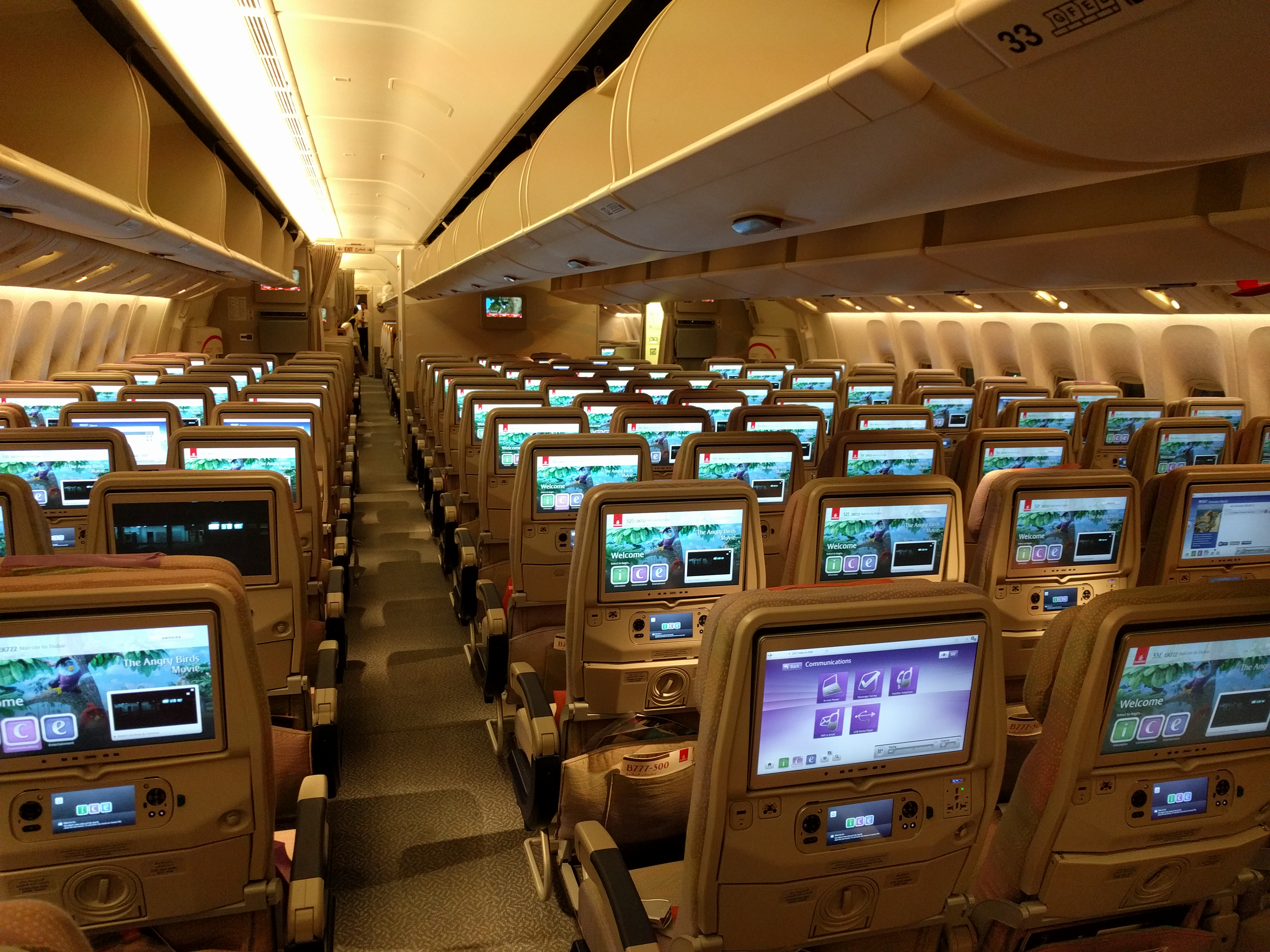
Economy Class on an Emirates Boeing 777-300ER

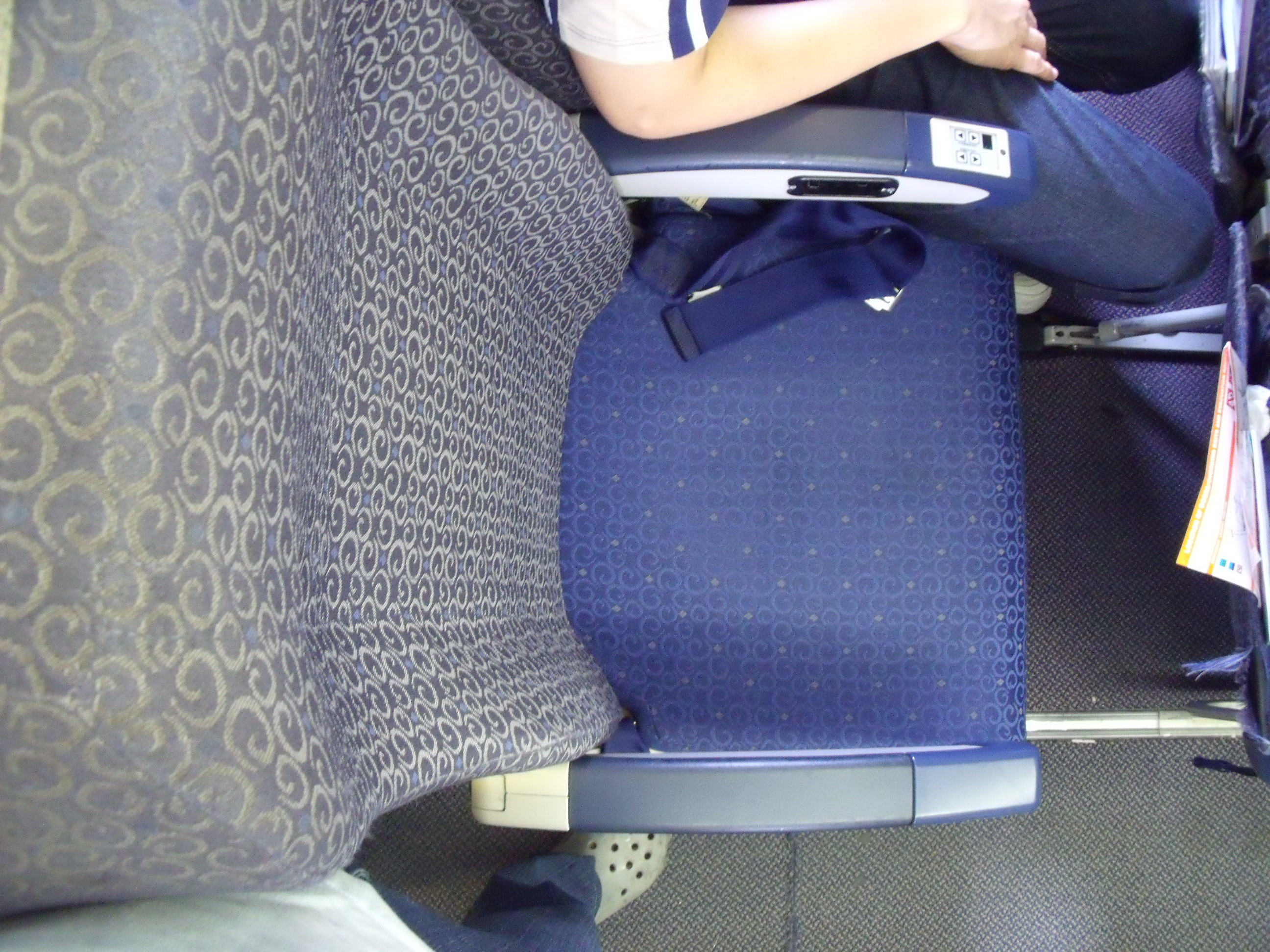
An economy seat on an aircraft

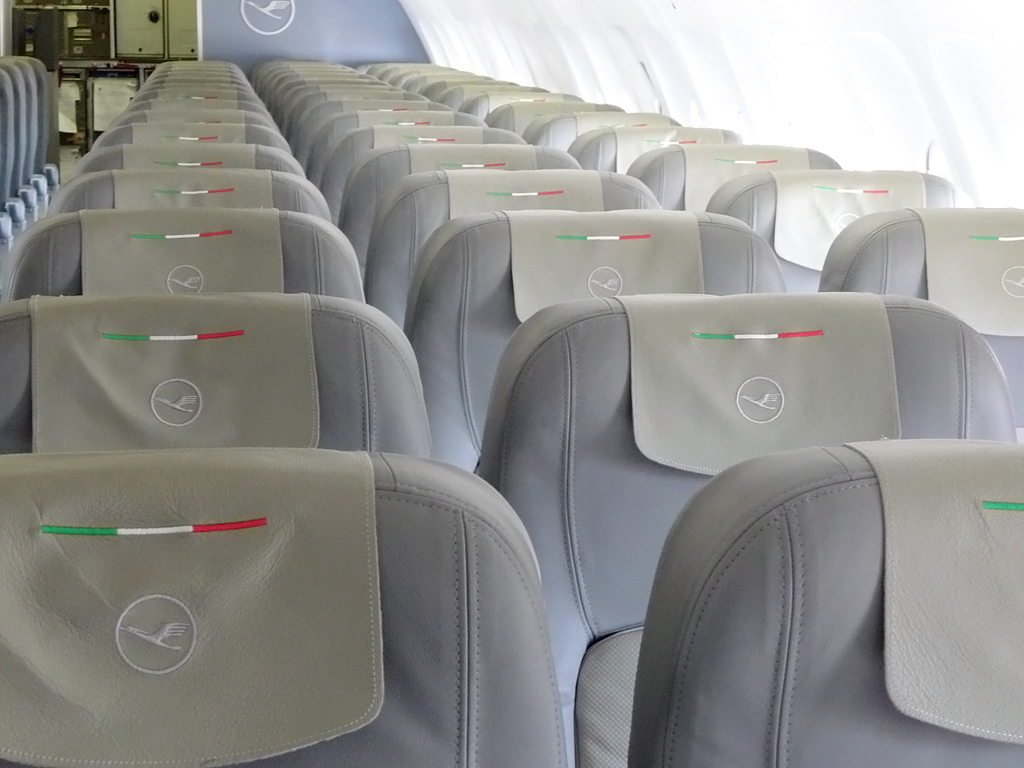
Economy class on a Lufthansa Italia Airbus A319

Economy class seats usually recline and have a fold-down table. Seat pitch ranges from 28 to 36 inches (71 to 91 cm), usually 30–32 in (76–81 cm), and 30 to 36 in (76 to 91 cm) for international economy class seats. Domestic economy seat width ranges from 17 to 18.25 in (43.2 to 46.4 cm). Full economy class is usually denoted 'Y' with schedule flexibility, but can be many other letters.

A pocket on the seat in front will typically contain an airsickness bag, an inflight magazine, a duty-free catalogue, and a safety and evacuation card. Depending on the airline, extras might include a blanket, an amenities bag (e.g. ear plugs, toothpaste, eye mask), and headphones. In-flight entertainment in economy class is usually consisted of individual screens for each seat that may show video on demand. For passengers sitting immediately behind a bulkhead or on the same row as an emergency exit, the in-flight entertainment screen may be contained within one of the armrests of the seat. Some low-cost carriers can charge a fee for headphones. However, economy standards vary between carriers. Aeroflot, Qantas, and Cathay Pacific offer in-flight audio and visual entertainment and meals on both international and selected domestic routes to all passengers, including those in economy, while other airlines such as Transaero may charge an additional fee for the in-flight entertainment.

Availability of food also varies. Some major carriers no longer serve meals in economy for short flights. Meals are now only generally provided on international flights. Some airport vendors have started to offer packaged meals to economy travellers that can be carried on to flights. Low-cost carriers, such as EasyJet and Ryanair, charge for food and drinks on flights. In addition, many carriers, particularly within the United States and Canada, also make economy passengers pay for airport check-in, checked bags, pillows, blankets, and headphones.

Many airlines have created a slightly enhanced Economy class with, for example, a slightly larger pitch between seats such as Economy Plus from United Airlines. Arguably, such enhanced Economy classes only restore some of the comfort and amenities that were lost over the past few decades.

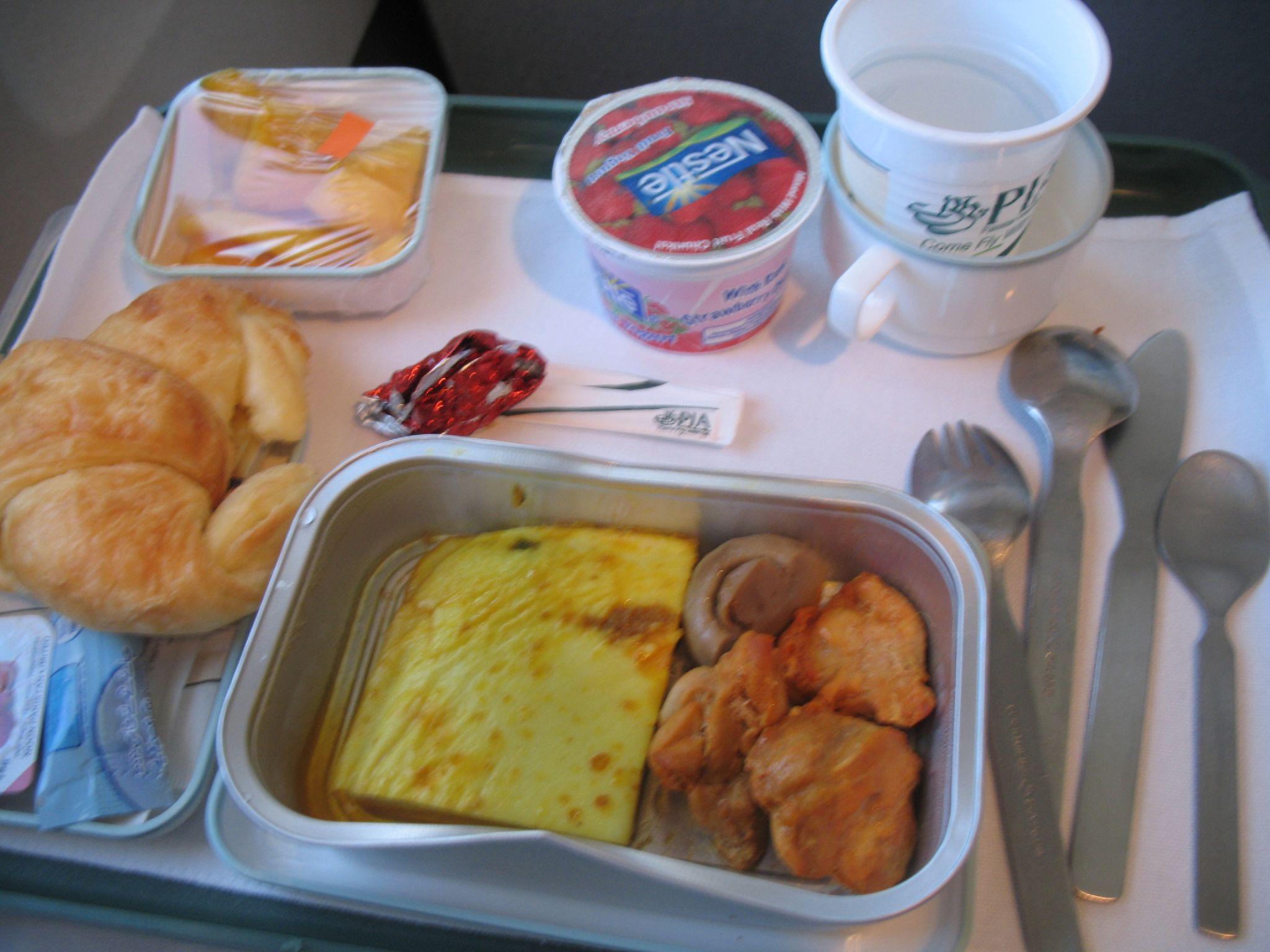
Breakfast in Economy Class of a Pakistan International Airlines Boeing 777

Perhaps the first cheaper-than-standard airline flights were United's Boeing 247s between San Francisco and Los Angeles (Burbank) in 1940. Their non-stop DC-3s carried full-fare passengers ($18.95 one way) and Boeings flew a couple of two-stop flights each way for $13.90. That ended in 1942, and low fares did not reappear on scheduled airlines until 1948 when Pan Am started one DC-4 flight a day from New York La Guardia to San Juan Puerto Rico with a $75 fare instead of the normal $133. In 1949, a tourist seat on a Pan Am DC-4 from New York to Rio cost $382 instead of $460 on the standard DC-4 making the same stops.

In late 1948, Capital Airlines started one DC-4 flight each way a day between Chicago and New York La Guardia. Each flight left at 1 AM and stopped for ten minutes at Pittsburgh (Allegheny County). Chicago-NY fare was $29.60 plus 15% federal tax; seats on all other flights cost $44.10 plus tax. Coach flights slowly spread (all domestic flights were one-class, coach or standard, until TWA started two-class 1049Gs in 1955); in 1961, domestic coach passenger-miles for the year exceeded first-class for the first time.

IATA allowed transatlantic tourist fares in summer 1952: New York to London cost $270 one way instead of $395. In the next few years, tourist fares spread around the world.

Carbon emissions for business and first class passengers are about three and four times higher respectively, per passenger-kilometre travelled.

== Premium economy class ==
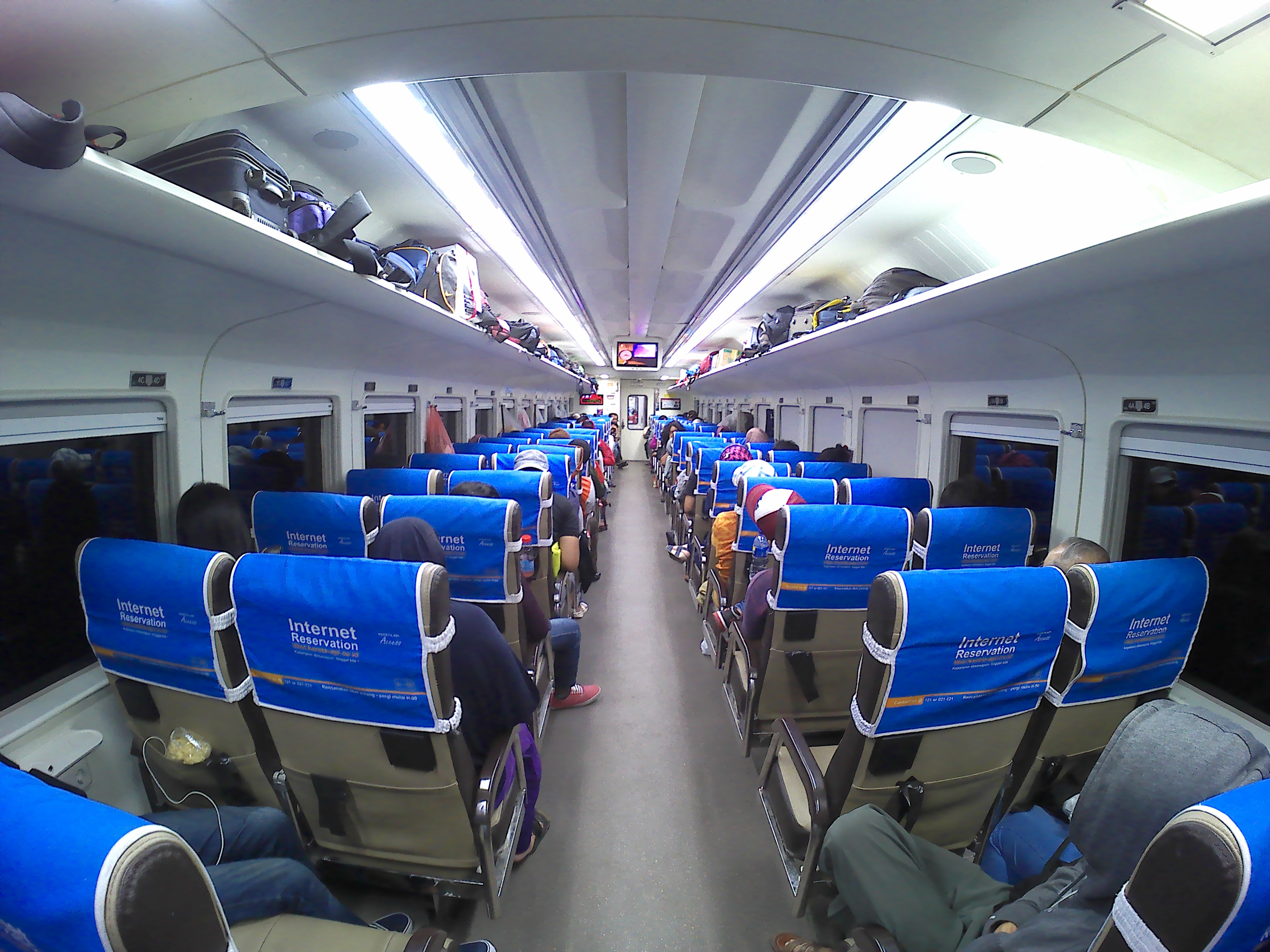
Premium economy class train in Indonesia

Many airlines offer a Premium Economy class to passengers willing to pay slightly more for better seats and, in some cases, better service. Premium Economy class is positioned as a middle-ground between standard economy class and business class in terms of price, comfort, and amenities. On some airlines, like WestJet, Premium Economy has replaced Business Class or First Class as the highest class of service on short-haul flights. The definition for Premium Economy class is not standardized and varies widely from airline to airline. Typically this includes a larger recliner seat, better dining options, complementary alcoholic beverages, and amenity kits.

== Economy plus ==
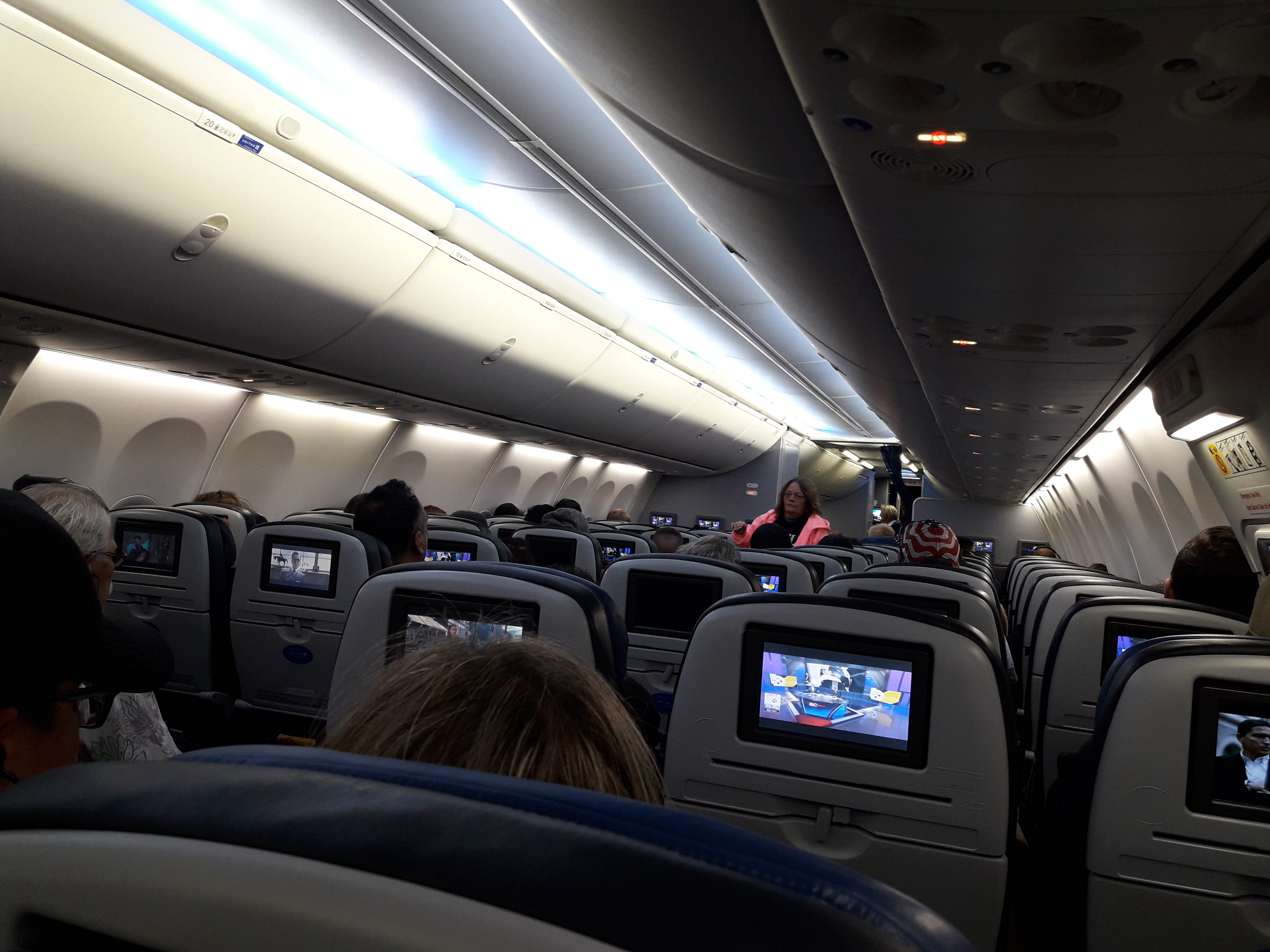
Economy Plus on a United Airlines 737-900 in February 2018

Economy plus is an enhanced service offered by some airlines. These seats are offered to those with existing economy tickets if they pay a seat selection fee, and may be assignable for free for an airline's loyalty program members. Unlike premium economy, economy plus is still considered economy cabin, having the same fare basis code. Economy plus seats have more legroom than other economy seats. They may also come with some soft perks like complementary alcoholic beverages or priority boarding. Airlines offering economy plus include United Airlines, American Airlines (branded Main Cabin Extra), Delta Air Lines (branded Comfort+), Virgin Australia (branded Economy X), and JetBlue (branded Even More Space.)

== Basic economy ==
Basic economy, or fifth class (if premium economy is counted as third class and standard economy is counted as fourth class) or last class, is the class below regular economy. Basic economy was first provided by Delta Air Lines for America's domestic market in 2012, closely followed by American Airlines (AA) and United Airlines for some domestic routes. Both Delta Air Lines and AA also plan to provide basic economy for international routes, which could see other airlines follow suit, leading to its global adoption. The class has been criticised as "a clever way to raise the price of standard economy fares" and for its poorly-designed pricing algorithms.

== See also ==
- Aircraft cabin
- Airline seat
- Business class
- Economy class syndrome
- Fare basis code
- First class (aviation)
- First class travel
- Wide-body aircraft
