= 1866 in Sweden =

- Decades: 1840s; 1850s; 1860s; 1870s; 1880s
- See also: Other events of 1866; Timeline of Swedish history

Events from the year 1866 in Sweden

== Incumbents ==
- Monarch – Charles XV

== Events ==
- The Riksdag of the Estates is dissolved and replaced by the Riksdag.
- General Industrial Exposition of Stockholm (1866)
- The Governmental Girls' School Committee of 1866 recommend a number of reforms in women's rights, such as access to a number of professions, to make universities available to women, to regulate girl's high schools so as to prepare women for university studies, introduce Gymnasium (school) for women, and give government support to the girl schools which met with the demands. These recommendations are met within the next few years.
- The title of Fröken (Miss), until then reserved for noblewomen, are permitted for all unmarried women, and the title Mamsell comes out of use.
- In Gothenburg, Emanuella Carlbeck open the first institution for people with Intellectual disability in Sweden.
- Emmy Rappe are sent to Florence Nightingale School of Nursing and Midwifery at St Thomas' Hospital in London in order to be educated in nursing.
- Elizabeth Stride emigrate to London in Great Britain.
- The inauguration of the Norrköping Central Station.
- The first issue of the Smålandsposten.
- Foundation of the Stockholms Allmänna Skyddsförening.
- Rosalie Fougelberg becomes the first female dentist after the profession had been formally opened to women.
- In 1866, founded Swedish School of Textiles at the University of Borås.
- Alfred Nobel invented dynamite in 1866.

== Births ==
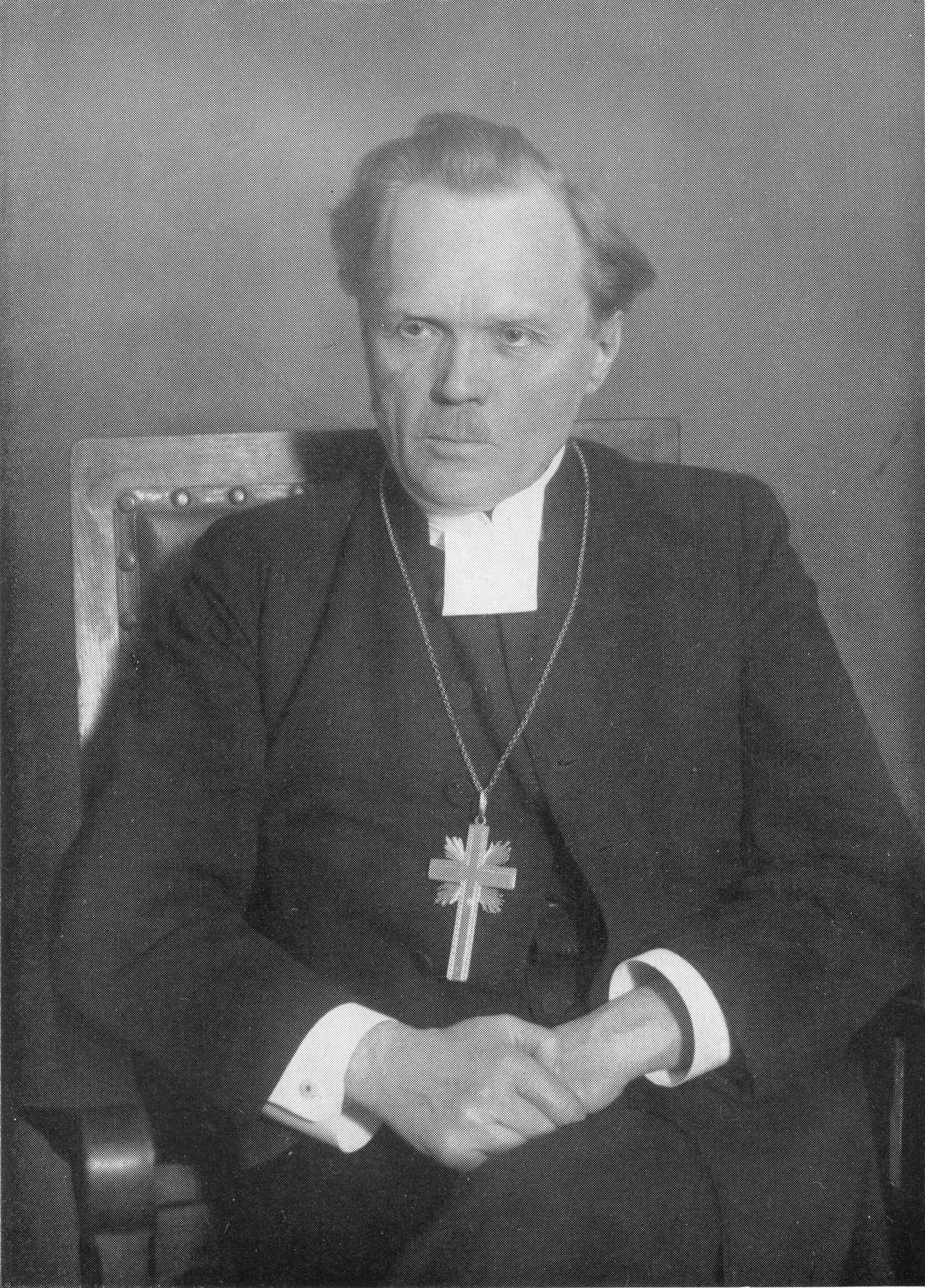
Nathan Söderblom, Archbishop of Uppsala, recipient of the Nobel Peace Prize 1930

- 13 January – Emilia Broomé, women's rights activist and politician (died 1925)
- 15 January - Nathan Söderblom, clergyman, archbishop (died 1931)
- 22 February - Erika Aittamaa glove maker (died 1952)
- 21 May - Ebba von Eckermann women's rights activist (died 1960)
- 8 July – Nils Adlercreutz, horse rider (died 1955).
- 14 July – Ragnar Östberg, architect (died 1945)
- 29 September – Per Hallström, writer (died 1960)
- 20 October – Gustav Cassel, economist (died 1945)
- 11 December – Ebba Hay, tennis player (died 1954)
- 18 December – Gertrud Månsson, politician (died 1935)

== Deaths ==
- 12 April – Carolina Kuhlman, actress (born 1778)
- 24 March – Carl d'Unker, artist (born 1828)
- 6 August – Christian Eric Fahlcrantz, writer (born 1780)
- 16 September – Johan Fredrik Höckert, artist (born 1826)
- Brita Sofia Hesselius, the first professional female photographer in Sweden (born 1801).
