= 1863 in Sweden =

- Decades: 1840s; 1850s; 1860s; 1870s; 1880s
- See also: Other events of 1863; Timeline of Swedish history

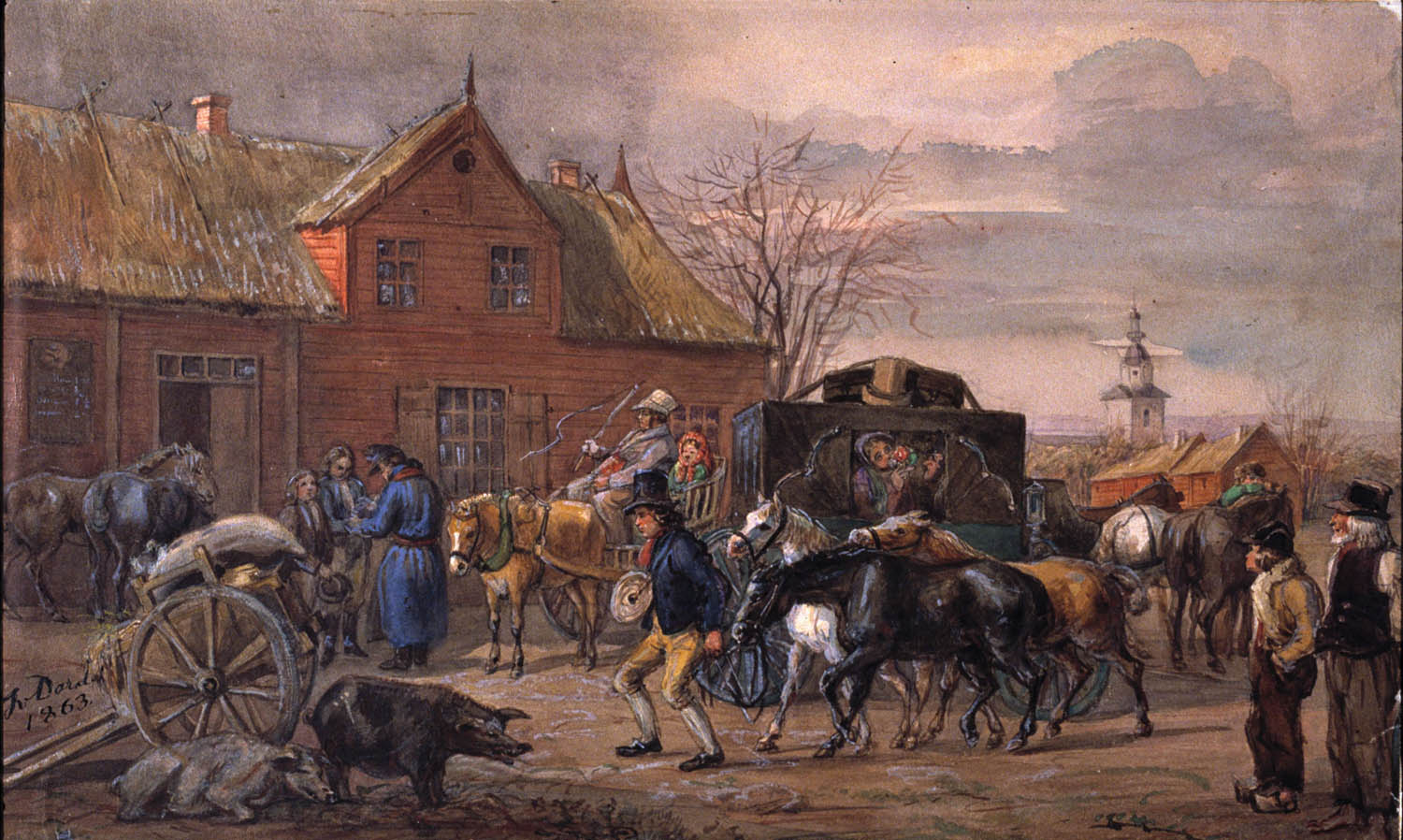

Events from the year 1863 in Sweden

== Incumbents ==
- Monarch – Charles XV

== Events ==
- 1863–1864: Rudberg and Gillis Bildt develop a city plan for Stockholm. Albert Lindhagen is appointed head of a commission to examine the plan the following year, only to produce a plan of his own in 1866. The plan, published in 1867, results in no actions.
- - Inauguration of Berns Salonger in Stockholm.
- - Foundation of Skandinaviska Banken.
- - Alfred Nobel invents dynamite.
- - Foundation of the Alfred Berg company.
- - The Risbergska skolan is founded.
- - Danviken Hospital is closed.
- - The Post- and telegraph professions are opened to women.
- 7 August - Johanna Hedén becomes the first licensed female surgeon by passing her exam as feldsher.

== Policies ==
- Åborätt (Åbo Right) was adjusted last time in 1863 and still to this day is in power.

== Military ==
Sweden purchased 2,000 French revolvers and designated them m/1863.

== Births ==
- 15 December – Axel Danielsson, socialist agitator, journalist and writer (died 1899)
- 11 March – Amanda Christensen, business person (died 1928)
- 19 July - Anna Ahlström, school founder, woman's rights advocate
