= Jönköpings-Posten =

Swedish newspaper

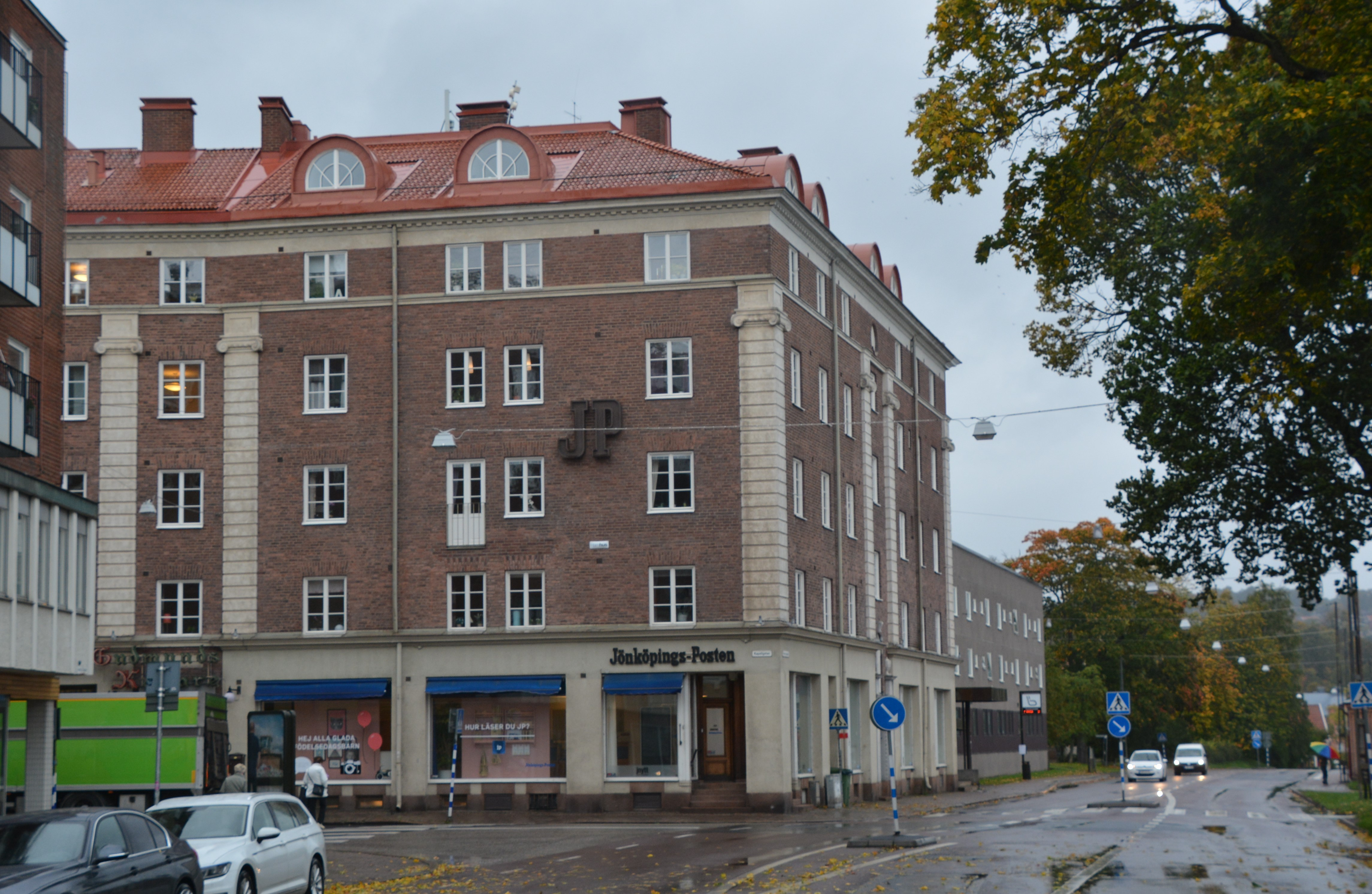
- Jönköpings-Posten's old building in Jönköping in October 2017
- Type: Newspaper
- Format: Tabloid
- Owner: Bonnier Group
- Founder: Herman Hall
- Founded: January 17, 1865; 161 years ago
- Political alignment: Liberal
- Language: Swedish
- Headquarters: Science Park Towers; Framgången 1; 551 80, Jönköping; Sweden
- Country: Sweden
- Circulation: ≈100,000 print and digital channels combined (2025)
- ISSN: 1103-9469
- OCLC number: 940608147
- Website: Jönköpings-Posten

Jönköpings-Posten, commonly called JP, is a Swedish newspaper published in Jönköping. It is the oldest and largest newspaper in both Jönköping county and the larger Småland area. Jönköpings-Posten has a monopoly position in its region. The news organization is owned by Bonnier Group, the largest newspaper and media organization in the Nordic countries.

== History and profile ==
Jönköpings-Posten was first published on 17 January 1865. The paper, which has a liberal stance, is based in the town of Jönköping and is published six days per week from Monday to Saturday. It was originally published in broadsheet format and was the last Swedish newspaper to switch to tabloid format. Jönköpings-Posten is primarily distributed via digital channels - website, Android or iOS app, and reaches on average 100 thousand people on a daily basis.

Historic circulation
Year	Circulation
2012	32,800
2013	31,400
