= Business class =

Class on airlines and rail lines

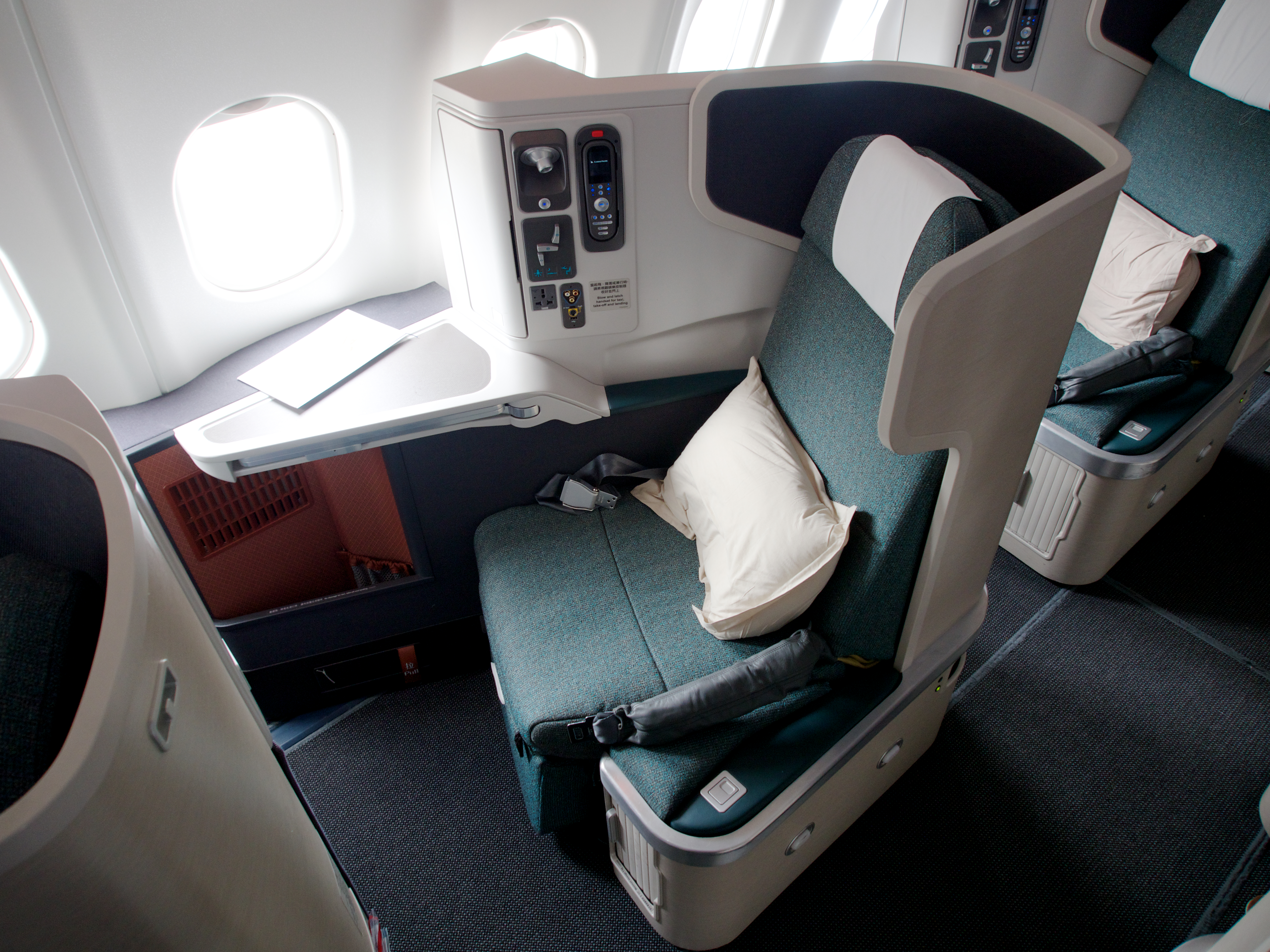
Business-class seat on a Cathay Pacific Airbus A330-300. Visible on the right hand side of the seat is controls to operate the recline, as well as a remote control for the in-flight entertainment system.

Business class is a travel class available on many commercial airlines and rail lines, known by brand names that vary by airline or rail company. In the airline industry, it was originally intended as an intermediate level of service between economy class and first class, but many airlines now offer business class as the highest level of service, having eliminated first class seating. Business class is distinguished from other travel classes by the quality of seating, food, drinks, ground service and other amenities.

== Airlines ==
=== History ===
Airlines began separating full-fare and discounted economy-class passengers in the late 1970s. In 1976, KLM introduced a Full Fare Facilities (FFF) service for its full fare economy-class passengers, which allowed them to sit at the front of the economy cabin immediately behind first class, and this concept was quickly copied by several other airlines including Air Canada. Both United Airlines and Trans World Airlines experimented with a similar three-class concept in 1978, but abandoned it due to negative reactions from discount economy-class travelers who felt that amenities were being taken away from them. United also cited the difficulty of tracking which passengers should be seated in which section of the economy cabin on connecting flights. American Airlines also began separating full-fare economy passengers from discounted economy passengers in 1978, and offered open middle seats for full-fare passengers.

Around this time, there was speculation in the airline industry that supersonic aircraft would corner the market for the highest-paying premium passengers, and that a three-class market would emerge consisting of supersonic first class and subsonic business and economy classes. In 1977, El Al announced plans to reconfigure its aircraft with a small first class cabin and larger business-class cabin on the assumption that most transatlantic first class passengers would shift their business to the Concorde.

British Airways introduced "Club World", a separate premium cabin with numerous amenities, in October 1978 under CEO Colin Marshall as a means of further distinguishing full-fare business travelers from tourists flying on discounted fares. Pan Am announced that it would introduce "Clipper Class" in July 1978, and both Air France and Pan Am introduced business class in November 1978. Qantas claims to have launched the world's first Business Class in 1979.In addition to better check-in, and a unique in-flight menu containing business-style dining, Qantas claims to have offered world’s first business-class seating with bigger seats and more legroom but merely 15 percent above the economy fare.

On November 1, 1981, Scandinavian Airlines System introduced EuroClass with a separate cabin, dedicated check-in counters and lounges for full-fare passengers. Simultaneously, first class disappeared from their European fleet.

In commercial aviation, full business class is usually denoted by the fare basis code 'J' or 'C' with schedule flexibility, but can be many other letters depending on circumstances.

== Domestic and regional ==
=== Australia and New Zealand ===
Both Qantas and Virgin Australia offer business class on their domestic networks as well as on trans-Tasman flights to New Zealand. Flights between Perth and Sydney typically feature lie-flat seats, with deep recline cradle seats on other routes.

On the other hand, Air New Zealand does not offer business class on its domestic network. Business Class is available on flights between New Zealand, Australia and the Pacific Islands when operated by Boeing 777 and Boeing 787 family aircraft, both of which have lie-flat seats.

=== North America ===
==== Canada ====
On short-haul flights Air Canada offers recliner seats, which are similar to what is offered on regional business class in the United States. However, on some high-capacity routes, such as Vancouver–Toronto, Air Canada utilizes its long-haul fleet, such as the Boeing 777, Boeing 787, and the Airbus A330. On flights using internationally configured aircraft such as these, the business-class product is a lie-flat product. However, on discount carriers, such as Air Transat, business class is "euro-style", an economy-class seat with a blocked middle seat for added comfort.

With the introduction of their Boeing 787’s on select domestic and international routes, WestJet Airlines offers 16 lay-flat business seats on each of their 787-9’s.

==== United States ====
All three major U.S. airlines (American Airlines, United Airlines, and Delta Air Lines) exclusively use fully lie-flat Business Class seats with direct aisle access on their widebody aircraft, as well as some longer range narrow body aircraft, like the Boeing 757 and Airbus A321. A multiple course meal is served after takeoff, and depending on the flight length, a chilled snack or light meal will be served before landing. International Business Class passengers have access to priority check-in and security, along with lounge access. United and American both also offer premium lounges with enhanced food service in their hubs for these passengers.

Select routes between the East and West coasts are deemed "premium transcontinental" and offer comparable experiences to long haul international Business Class. However, it is uncommon for all seats to have direct aisle access. American uses a dedicated sub-fleet of 3-cabin A321T planes, with 20 lie-flat Flagship Business seats in a 2-2 configuration for these flights. JetBlue also has a sub-fleet of A321s featuring its Mint Business Class, which alternates between 2-2 lie flat seats and 1-1 suites with a closing door. United and Delta use a combination of wide and narrow body aircraft for these routes, with a variety of lie-flat seat designs.

Nearly all other flights in the U.S. (as well as to Canada, Central America, and the Caribbean) on American, United, Delta, and Alaska use 2-cabin narrowbody aircraft. The forward cabin is marketed as "First Class" on domestic routes, but, regardless, uses a Business Class fare basis. These fares include a larger "recliner" seat, priority check-in/security/boarding, and increased service. Both alcoholic and non-alcoholic beverages are included, and are served in glassware or ceramic mugs. Meal service is highly variable, depending on the airline, departure time, and route. Flights between hub airports during daytime hours are usually catered with a full warm meal, regardless of the flight time. Regional jets do not have ovens, and all entrees are served chilled. At the very least, a flight attendant will pass around a basket containing premium snacks.

=== Europe ===
European carriers generally offer a business class consisting of similar seating to economy class, but with better service. There may be a curtain to separate business from economy class, based on demand, but the seats are in the same cabin. Some airlines such as Air France and British Airways use convertible seats that seat three people across in economy, or adjust with a lever to become two seats with a half seat length between them for business-class use; others, such as Lufthansa and SAS, have the same seats for all passengers.

On shorter routes (typically less than one hour) many airlines have removed business class entirely (e.g. BMI on many routes) and offer only one class of service. British Airways used to offer "Business UK" on their domestic system, offering the same service as economy class, with the addition of expedited check-in, baggage reclaim, lounge access and priority boarding. In flight, until January 11, 2017, drink, tea or coffee and a snack were served to all customers, with a hot breakfast on flights prior to 9.29am.

The use of similar or identical seats for Business class and Economy enables greater flexibility for airlines, as the border between Business and Economy classes can be adjusted based on demand. However, it has been criticized for offering poor value-for-money, as the ticket pricing is similar to a "full" Business class with distinct seating, and for driving passengers to competing airlines that offer a Business class in distinct seating in routes where this is an option.

=== Discount carriers ===
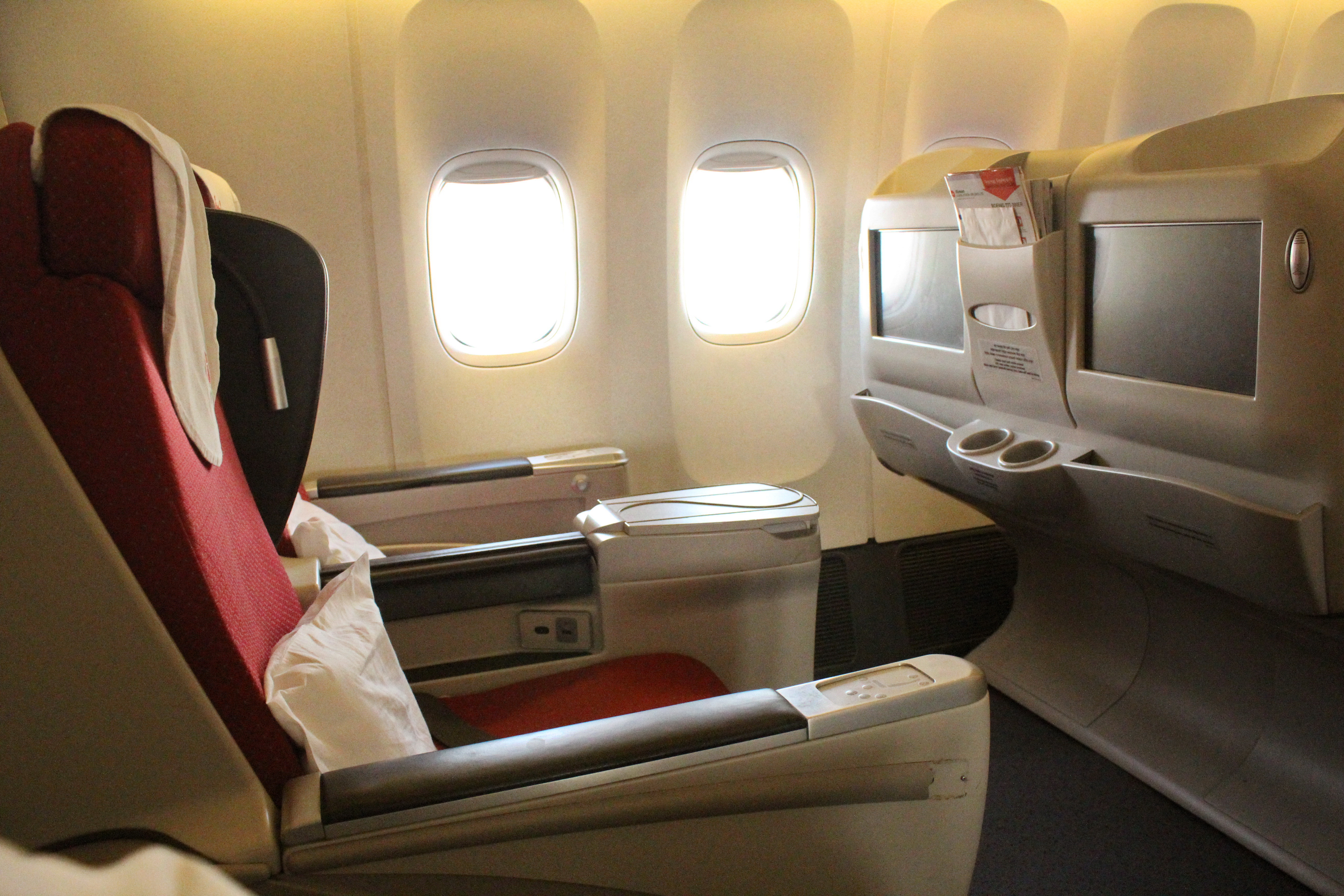
Business-class seats on a Biman Bangladesh Airlines Boeing 777-300ER en route to Dhaka from Jeddah.

Most low-cost carriers, such as Ryanair and EasyJet in Europe, Tigerair in Australia, Southwest Airlines in the United States, and even some national carriers such as Aer Lingus and Air New Zealand on their domestic and regional networks do not offer any premium classes of service. Some, however, have options above a standard coach seat:

- AirAsia charges a premium for passengers to sit at the front of the aircraft or the exit seats which also offer more legroom as well as board first (these are called Hot Seats).
- On their domestic and trans-Tasman networks, Air New Zealand has Space + seats available complimentary for Koru Club elite members and for a small charge at check-in for others. Other than a few more inches of legroom the seats are identical to normal economy seats.
- JetBlue offers Mint, a premium lie business class product which features luxurious suites and seats on transcontinental and transatlantic flights.
- Spirit Airlines had Big Front Seats in the first row of all their aircraft. The seats were part of Spirit's former First Class offering, Spirit Plus, but now offer no benefits other than bigger seat pitch and a 2 by 2, rather than 3 by 3 arrangement.

== Long haul ==
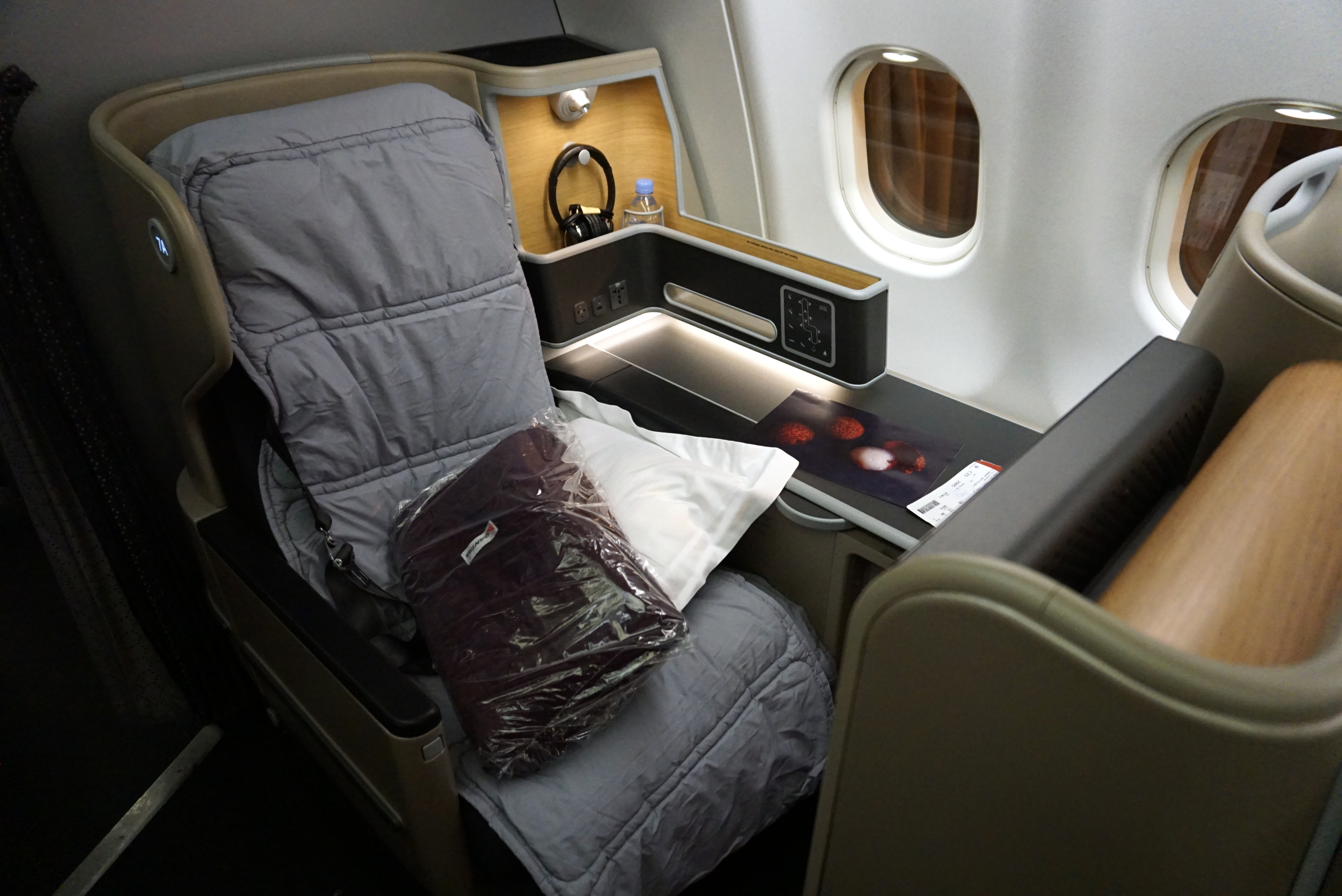
Qantas' Airbus A330 business-class seat with mattress overlay

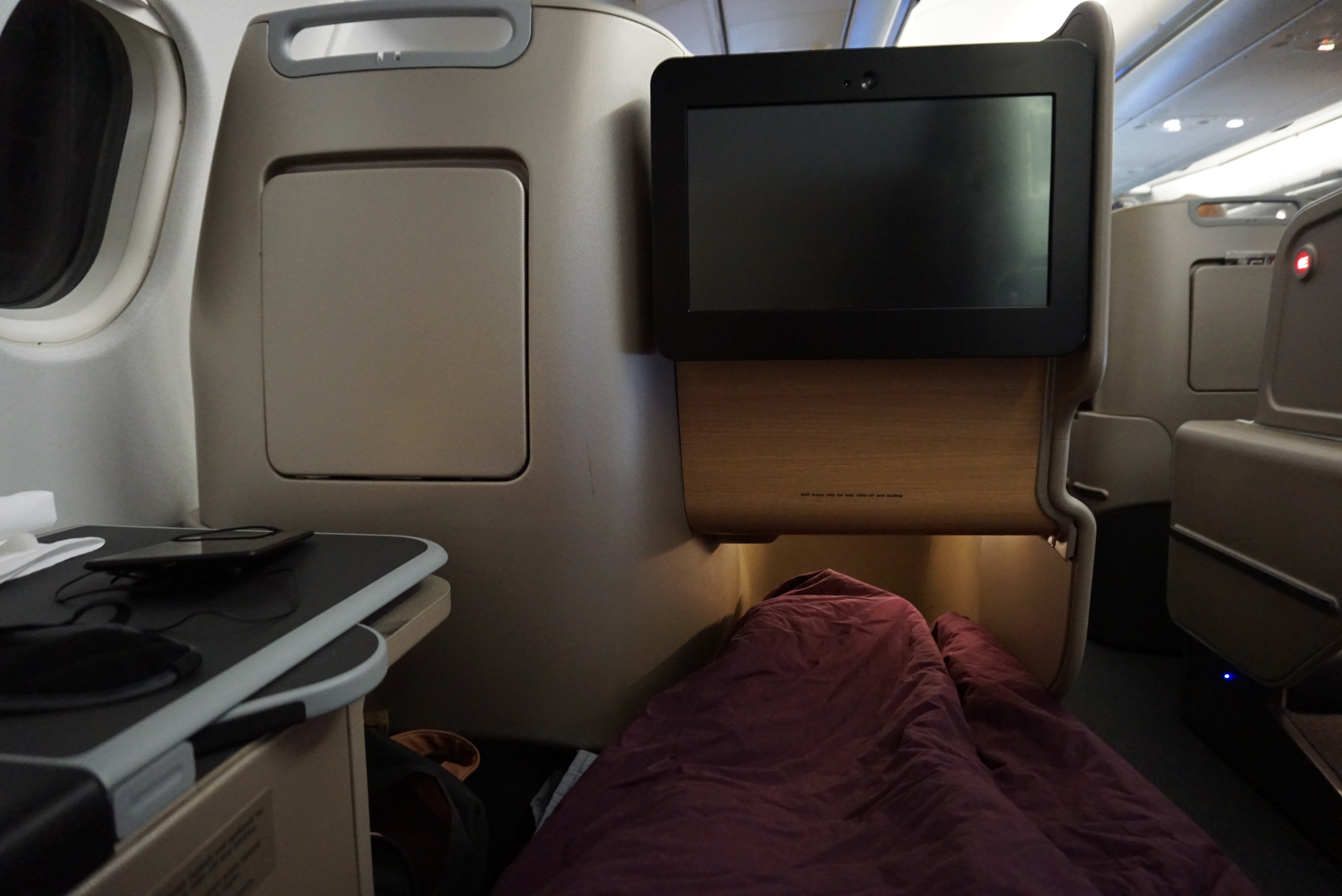
Qantas' business-class seat in lie-flat mode

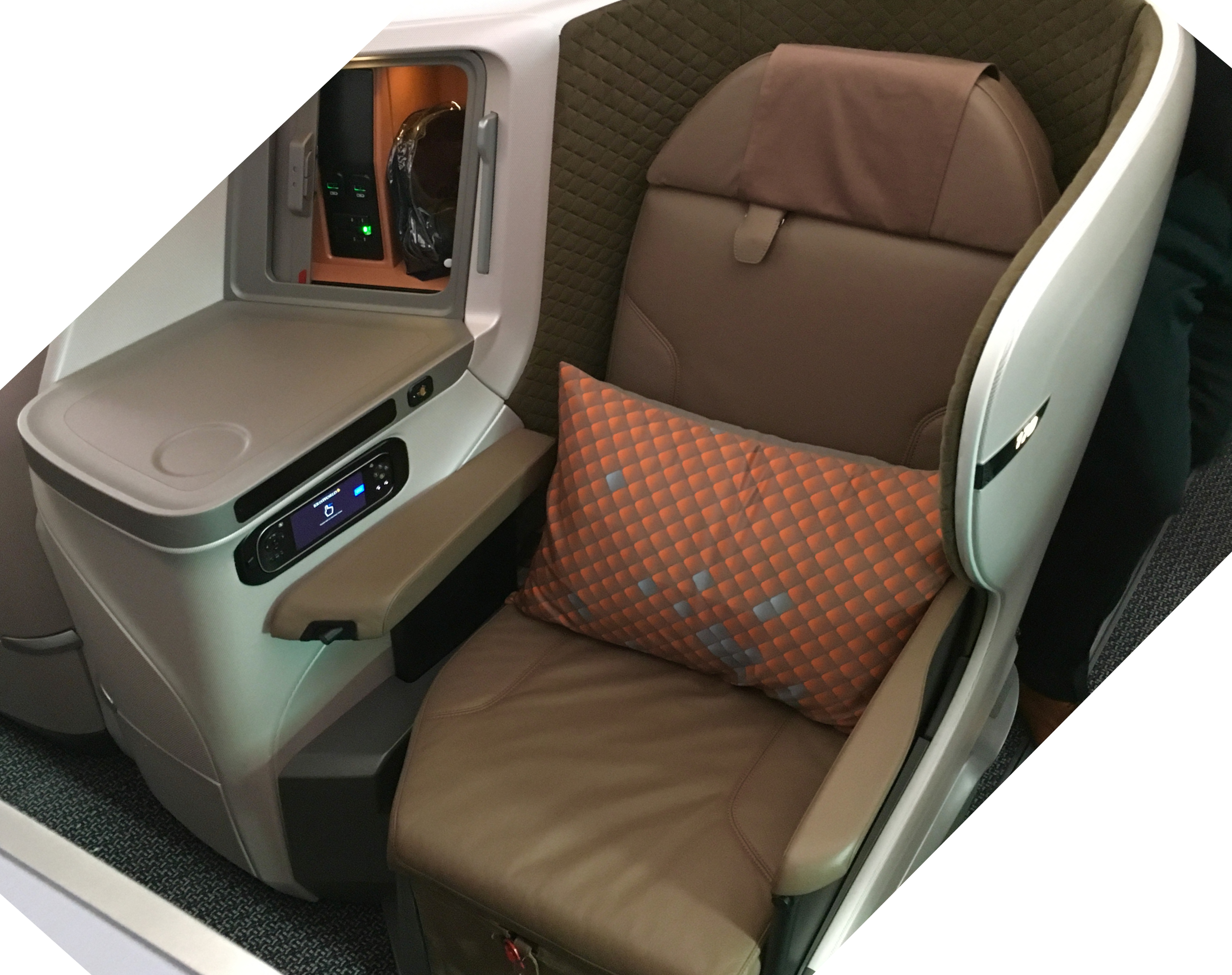
Fully flat seat on Singapore Airlines, used on shorter flights

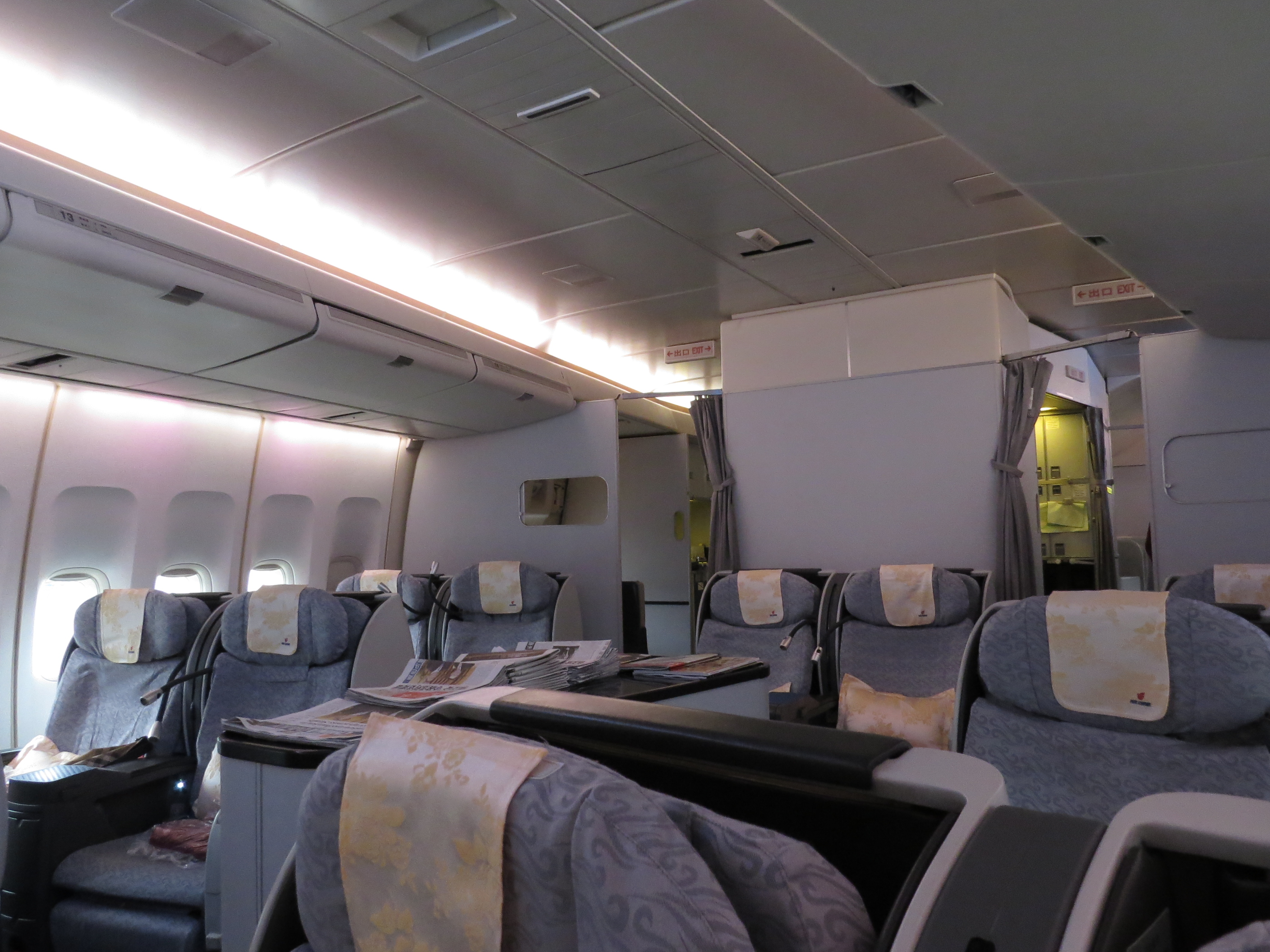
Angled lie-flat seat on Air China Boeing 747-400

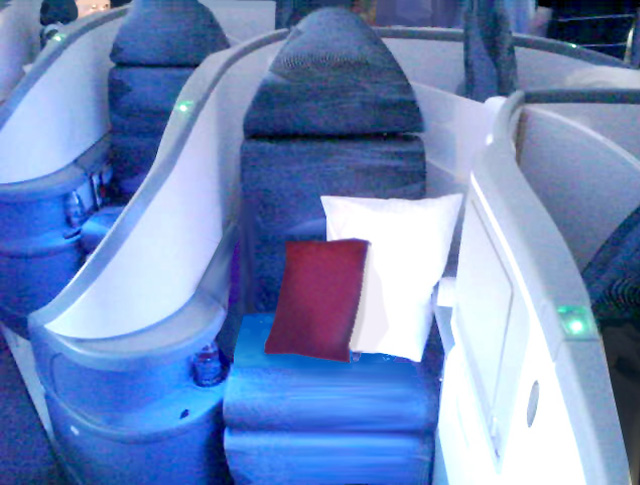
Fully flat herringbone seat on Air Canada

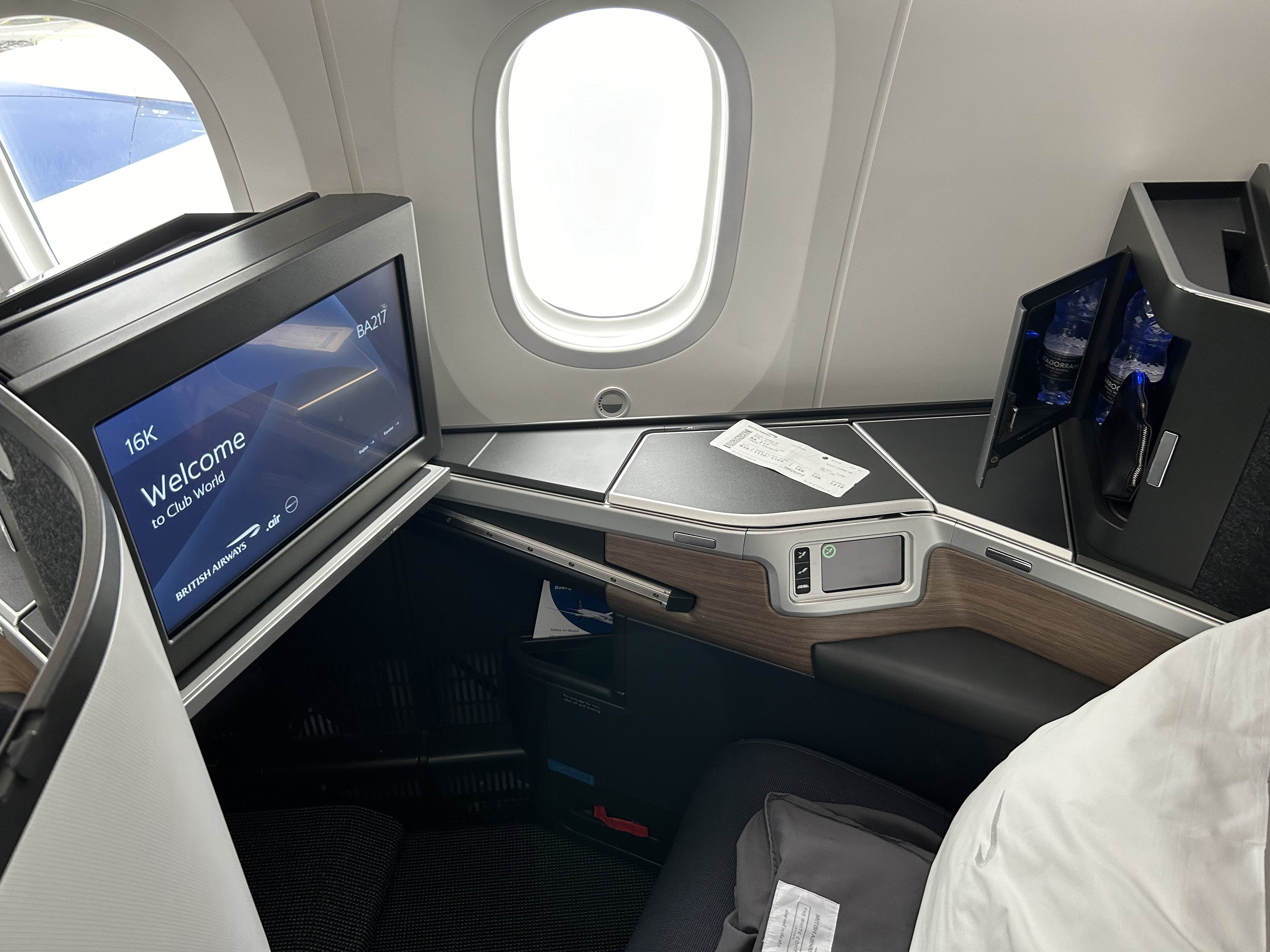
British Airways Club Suites seat on a Boeing 787-10 Dreamliner

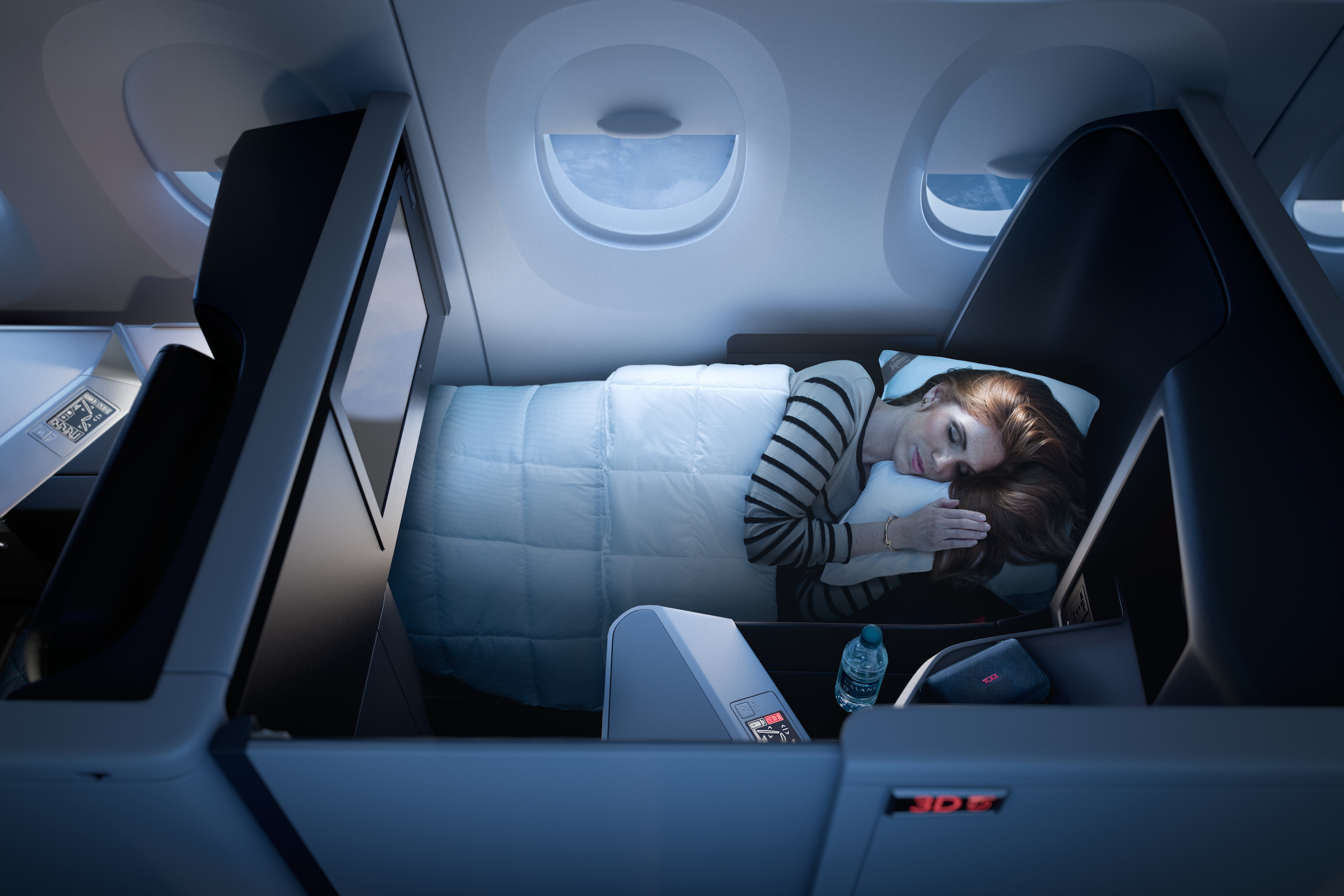
Delta Air Lines' Delta One suite on an Airbus A350

Business class is a much more significant upgrade from economy class for long-haul flights, in contrast to a regional or domestic flight where business class offers few relative advantages over economy class. The innovations in business-class seating, incorporating features previously only found in first class (see below), has narrowed the comfort and amenities gap with traditional first class seats. These advances and added features to business class, as well as the late 2000s recession, have caused some airlines to remove or not install first class seating in their aircraft (as first class seats are usually double the price of business class but can take up more than twice the room) which leaves business class as the most expensive seats on such planes, while other airlines have reintroduced first class sections as suites to stay upmarket over contemporary business class.

As with first class, all alcoholic beverages are complimentary and meals are of higher quality than economy class. Economy-class passengers are usually not permitted in the business-class cabin though first class passengers are generally allowed to cross the curtain between business and first class.

=== Seating ===
Long-haul business-class seats are substantially different from economy-class seats, and many airlines have installed "lie-flat" seats into business class, whereas previously seats with such a recline were only available in international first class. There are essentially three types of long-haul business-class seats today. These are listed in ascending order of perceived "quality".

- **Cradle/recliner seats** are seats with around 150-160 degrees of recline and substantially more leg room compared to the economy section. The seat pitch of business-class seats ranges from 38 to 79.5 in (97 to 202 cm) (usually 55–62 in (140–160 cm)), and the seat size of business-class seats range from 17.5 to 34 in (44 to 86 cm) (usually 20–22 in (51–56 cm)). Although many airlines have upgraded their long-haul business-class cabins to angled lie-flat or fully flat seats, cradle/recliner seats are still common in business class on shorter routes.
- **Angled lie-flat seats** recline 170 degrees (or slightly less) to provide a flat sleeping surface, but are not parallel to the floor of the aircraft when reclined, making them less comfortable than a bed. Seat pitch typically ranges from 55 to 65 in (140 to 170 cm), and seat width usually varies between 18 and 23 in (46 and 58 cm). These seats first appeared on Northwest, Continental, JAL, Qantas and several other airlines in 2002 and 2003.
- **Fully flat seats** recline into a flat sleeping surface which is parallel to the floor. Many airlines offer such seats in international first class but retain inferior seating in business class to differentiate the two products and fares. British Airways, which introduced flat beds in first class in 1995, was among the first airlines to introduce fully flat business-class seats with its Club World product in 1999.
  - **Herringbone seating**, in which seats are positioned at an angle to the direction of travel, is used in some widebody cabins to allow direct aisle access for each seat and to allow a large number of fully flat seats to occupy a small cabin space. The concept was first developed by Virgin Atlantic for its Upper Class cabin and has since been used by Delta, Cathay Pacific, Air Canada and other airlines.
- **Cabin seats** are designed to give the business-class traveler the most privacy they can attain while in flight. These seats are typically positioned in a 1–2–1 arrangement on a wide-body jet. On each side of the seat is a privacy panel about four feet in height. Aircraft such as these offer the best ergonomic comfort on long-haul business-class flights. These were first introduced on US Airways.

Recaro claims its CL6710 business-class seat is one of the lightest at 80 kg (176 lb) while other can be beyond 100 kg (220 lb), adding up to a 2–3 t (4,400–6,600 lb) for 60 seats.

=== Menus ===
While flying on a long-haul business-class flight, airlines such as Swiss, Lufthansa, SAS Scandinavian Airlines, and many others offer in-flight gourmet meals with a choice of entree. Upon seating in their seats, business-class passengers are presented with a choice of champagne, orange juice, or water (called pre-flight service), with a 3-5 course meal (typically including a salad, soup, entree (typically up to 3 choices), and a choice of dessert) to follow during the flight. Depending on the time of arrival, the flight may offer either a breakfast with a variety of choices or a light snack approximately 90 minutes prior to landing. Some airlines, such as Singapore Airlines, allow travelers to request specific meals not on the regular menu prior to the flight. The alcoholic beverage choices for business-class cabins are generous, with airlines offering different premium wines, and an assortment of beers and liqueurs.

=== Branding ===
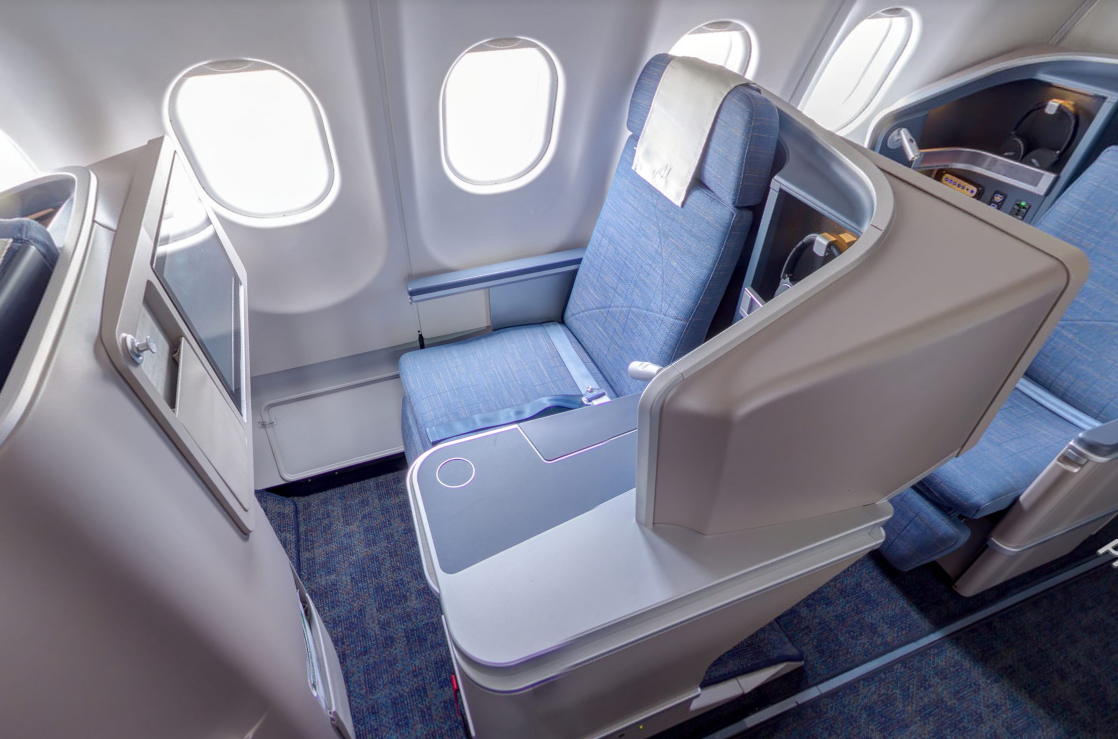
Philippine Airlines' Airbus A330 business-class seat.

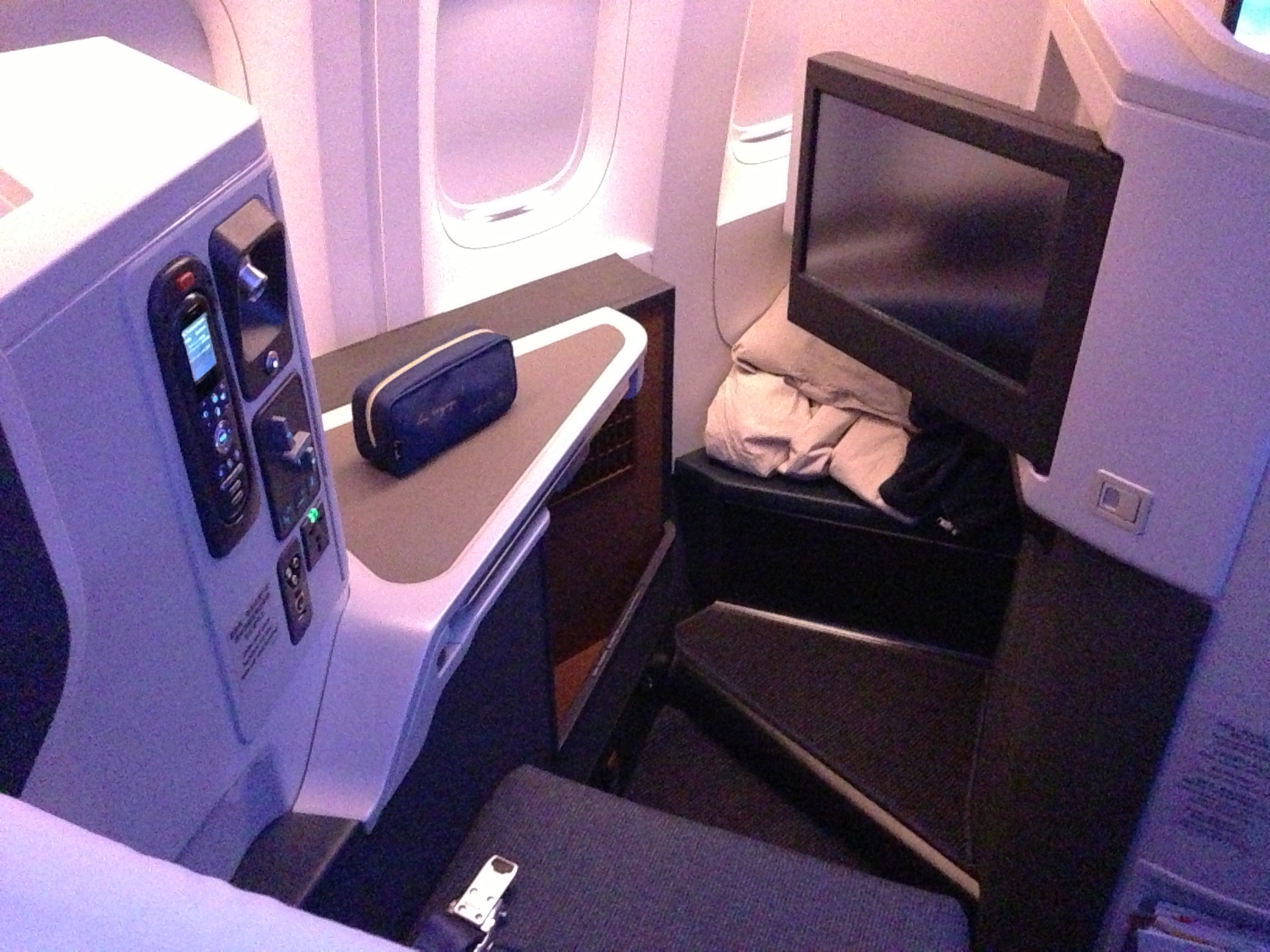
Cathay Pacific 77W business-class seat

The exact name for business class may vary between operators. Bold text indicates airlines for which business class is the highest class of service offered.

Airline	Service name	Status
Aegean Airlines	"**Business Class**"	Active
Aer Lingus	"**Business Class**" (formerly "**Premier Class"**)	Active
Aeroflot	"**Президент**" (long-haul; translated "**President**") "**Премьер**" (short and mid-haul; translated "**Premier**")	Active
Aerolíneas Argentinas	"**Club Cóndor**"	Active
Aeroméxico	"**Clase Premier**"	Active
Air Algérie	"Rouge Affaires"	Active
Air Astana	"Business Class"	Active
Air Austral	"**Club Austral**"	Active
Aircalin	"**Hibiscus class**"	Active
Air Canada	"**Signature Class**" (international, formerly "International Business Class") "North America Business Class (domestic and regional, formerly "Executive Class")	Active
Air Caraïbes	"**Classe Madras**"	Active
Air China	"Capital Pavilion"	Active
Air Europa	"**Business Class**"	Active
Air France	"Affaires" (translated "Business")	Active
Air Greenland	"**Nanoq Class**" (translated "Polar Bear Class")	Active
Air India	"Executive Class"	Active
Air Koryo	"**Business Class**"	Active
Air Macau	"**Business Class**"	Active
Air New Zealand	"**Business Premier**"	Active
Air Seychelles	"**Pearl Class**"	Active
AirAsia X	**"Premium Flatbed"**	Active
Alaska Airlines	"**First Class**"	Active
All Nippon Airways	"Business Class" (international; formerly "Club ANA")	Active
American Airlines	"Domestic First Class" and "Flagship Business"	Active
Asiana Airlines	"**Business Smartium**" or "**Business Class**"	Active
Austrian Airlines	"**Business Class**" (formerly "**Grand Class**")	Active
Avianca	"Clase Ejecutiva" (translated "Business Class")	Active
Azul Brazilian Airlines	"Business Xtra"	Active
Bangkok Airways	"Blue Ribbon Class"	Active
Batik Air	"**Business Class**"	Active
Beijing Capital Airlines	"**Business Class**"	Active
Biman Bangladesh Airlines	"**Business Class**"	Active
British Airways	"Club World" (long haul) "Club Suites" (used specifically to refer to the newest Club World product) "Club Europe" (domestic and European routes)	Active
Brussels Airlines	"**Business Class**"	Active
Cathay Pacific	"Business Class" (formerly "Marco Polo Business Class" in the 1980s and 1990s) "Aria Suite" (Available from 2024 Q2, for Boeing 777-300ER only)	Active
Caribbean Airlines	"**Business Class**"	Active
China Airlines	"**Business Class**" (formerly "Dynasty Class") and "**Premium Business Class**"	Active
China Eastern Airlines	"Business Class"	Active
China Express Airlines	"**Business Class**"	Active
China Southern Airlines	"**Business Class**"	Active
Chongqing Airlines	"**Business Class**"	Active
Copa Airlines	"**Clase Ejecutiva**"	Active
Cyprus Airways	"**Apollo Class**"	Active
Delta Air Lines	"**Delta One**" (formerly "**Business Elite**") and "Delta One Suite", "First Class"	Active
Donghai Airlines	"Business Class"	Active
Druk Air	"Business Class"	Active
El Al	"**מחלקת עסקים**" (translated "**Business Class**")	Active
EgyptAir	"**حورس**" (translated "**Horus**")	Active
Emirates	"Business Class"	Active
Ethiopian Airlines	"**Cloud Nine**"	Active
Etihad Airways	"Pearl Business Class" and "Business Studio"	Active
EVA Air	"**Royal Laurel**", "Premium Laurel" and "Business Class"	Active
Fiji Airways	"**Tabua Class**"	Active
Finnair	"**Business Class**"	Active
Garuda Indonesia	"Business Class" (formerly "Executive Class")	Active
Gulf Air	"**Falcon Gold**"	Active
Hainan Airlines	"**Business Class**"	Active
Hawaiian Airlines	"**Premium Business Class**" (international) "**Business Class**" (domestic and regional; formerly "First Class") "**Leihoku Suites**" (787-9 only)	Active
Hebei Airlines	"**Business Class**"	Active
Himalaya Airlines	"**Business Class**"	Active
Hong Kong Airlines	"**Business Class**"	Active
IndiGo	"**Stretch**"	Active
Iberia	"**Business Plus**" and "**Business Class**"	Active
Icelandair	"**Saga Class**"	Active
Iran Air	"هما کلاس" (translated "Homa Class")	Active
ITA Airways	"**Business Class**" (international) "**Superior Class**" (domestic)	Active
Japan Airlines	"JAL Business Class" (international) "Class J" (domestic)	Active
Jazeera Airways	"**Business Class**"	Active
JetBlue	"**Mint**"	Active
Jetstar	"**Business Class**"	Active
Juneyao Airlines	"**Business Class**"	Active
Kenya Airways	"**Premiere World**"	Active
KLM	"**World Business Class**" and "**Europe Business Class**"	Active
Korean Air	"Prestige Class"	Active
Kunming Airlines	"**Business Class**"	Active
Kuwait Airways	"Business Class"	Active
LATAM Airlines Group	"**Premium Business**"	Active
Lao Airlines	"**Business Class**"	Active
Lucky Air	"Business Class"	Active
LOT Polish Airlines	"Elite Club" (Boeing 787 only) and "Business Class" (other aircraft)	Active
Lufthansa	"Business Class"	Active
Mahan Air	"Business Class" ("Premium Economy" in A340 long-haul flights; not available in BAe 146 aircraft)	Active
Malaysia Airlines	"Business Class" (formerly "Golden Club Class")	Active
Maldivian	"Business Class"	Active
Malindo Air	"Business Class"	Active
MIAT Mongolian Airlines	"Business Class"	Active
Middle East Airlines	"**Cedar Class**"	Active
Myanmar National Airlines	"Business Class"	Active
Nam Air	"Business Class"	Active
Nepal Airlines	"**Shangrila Class**"	Active
Norfolk Air	"Premium Economy" (formerly "Bounty Class")	Active
Olympic Air	"**Business Class**" or **Gold Business Class** (literally "**Distinguished Class**")	Active
Oman Air	"Business Class"	Active
Pakistan International Airlines	"**Business Plus+**"	Active
PAL Express	"Business Class"	Active
Philippine Airlines	"Business Class" (formerly "**Mabuhay Class**")	Active
Qantas	"**Business Class**" and "Business Suite"	Active
Qatar Airways	"Business Class" and "Qsuite"	Active
Royal Air Maroc	"Premium Class"	Active
Royal Brunei Airlines	"Business Class"	Active
Royal Jordanian	"Crown Class"	Active
Saudia	"درجة الأفق" (translated "**Horizon Class**")	Active
Scandinavian Airlines	"**Business Class**"	Active
Scoot	"**ScootPlus**"	Active
Shanghai Airlines	"Business Class"	Active
Shenzhen Airlines	"Business Class"	Active
Sichuan Airlines	"Business Class"	Active
Sky Angkor Airlines	"Business Class"	Active
Singapore Airlines	"Business Class" (formerly "Raffles Class")	Active
South African Airways	"Business Class" (formerly "Gold Class")	Active
SpiceJet	"**SpiceBiz**" (Boeing 737 only)	Active
SriLankan Airlines	"**Business Class**"	Active
Sriwijaya Air	"Business Class"	Active
Swiss International Air Lines	"SWISS Business"	Active
TAAG Angola Airlines	"**Executiva Class**"	Active
TAP Portugal	"**TAP Executive**"	Active
TAROM	"**Business Class**"	Active
Thai AirAsia X	**"Premium Flatbed"**	Active
Thai Airways	"Royal Silk Class"	Active
Thai Lion Air	"Business Class"	Active
Tianjin Airlines	"Business Class"	Active
Tibet Airlines	"Business Class"	Active
Turkish Airlines	"Business Class"	Active
Turkmenistan Airlines	"Business Class"	Active
United Airlines	"United Polaris" (international) "United First" (domestic) "United Business" (regional) "**United Polaris Studio**" (coming in 2026, 787 Dreamliner only)	Active
US-Bangla Airlines	"Business Class"	Active
Uzbekistan Airways	"Business Class"	Active
Vietnam Airlines	"**Business Class**"	Active
Virgin Atlantic	"**Upper Class**"	Active
Virgin Australia	"**Domestic Business**" and "**International Business**"	Active
Vistara	"Business Class"	Active
WestJet	"Business Class"	Active
XiamenAir	"Business Class"	Active
AirTran Airways	"**Business Class**"	Defunct
Alitalia	"**Magnifica**" (translated "Wonderful") "**Ottima**" (short-haul; no longer in use)	Defunct
America West Airlines	"**America West First**"	Defunct
Bassaka Air	"Business Class"	Defunct
British Caledonian	"**Executiv.e**" and "**Super Executive**"	Defunct
Canadian Airlines	"**Business Class**"	Defunct
Cathay Dragon	"Business Class"	Defunct
Continental Airlines	"**BusinessFirst**"	Defunct
Jet Airways	"**Premiere Class**"	Defunct
Kingfisher Airlines	"**Kingfisher First**"	Defunct
Malév Hungarian Airlines	"**SkyClub Business Class**"	Defunct
Mexicana de Aviación	"**Elite Class**"	Defunct
Midwest Airlines	"**Signature Service**"	Defunct
Mihin Lanka	"**Business Class**"	Defunct
Northwest Airlines	"**World Business Class**"	Defunct
Pan Am	"**Clipper Class**"	Defunct
Regent Airways	"Business Class"	Active
Spanair	"**Premium Class**"	Defunct
Spirit Airlines	"**Big Front Seat**" (formerly "**Spirit Plus**"; service is no different from economy since transitioning to a no-frills carrier, but seats are roomier)	Defunct
Trans World Airlines	"**Ambassador Class**" (until the 1980s); "**TransWorld One**" (after 3-class service reduced to 2 in the 1990s)	Defunct
US Airways	"**Envoy**" (Brazil, Europe and Israel) "**Business Class**" and "**First Class**" (domestic)	Defunct
Vistara	"**Business Class**"	Defunct

== Environmental impact ==
Greenhouse gases, mainly carbon dioxide, are emitted from aircraft due to burning fuel. About 2% of global carbon emissions are produced by aviation industry.

Flying business class results in greater emissions than flying in economy-class seating, in part due to the amount of space associated with it.

For long-haul flights, carbon emissions per passenger per kilometre travelled are about three times higher for business class and four times higher for first class, according to the UK Department for Energy Security and Net Zero.

The length of the flight impacts the environment: as most emissions are generated through the takeoff phase in a plane's journey, it means short-haul flights are more impactful on the environment, as a larger proportion of the journey is in this phase. Whereas for longer haul flights, the plane is cruising for a longer proportion of the journey, making it less impactful on the environment than a short-haul flight, but it is still causing emissions. Transfer flights or routes that encompass multiple connecting flights also increase emissions as the takeoff phase is repeated. Private jets are also problematic, as emissions are generated for only a small number of people.

== Trains ==
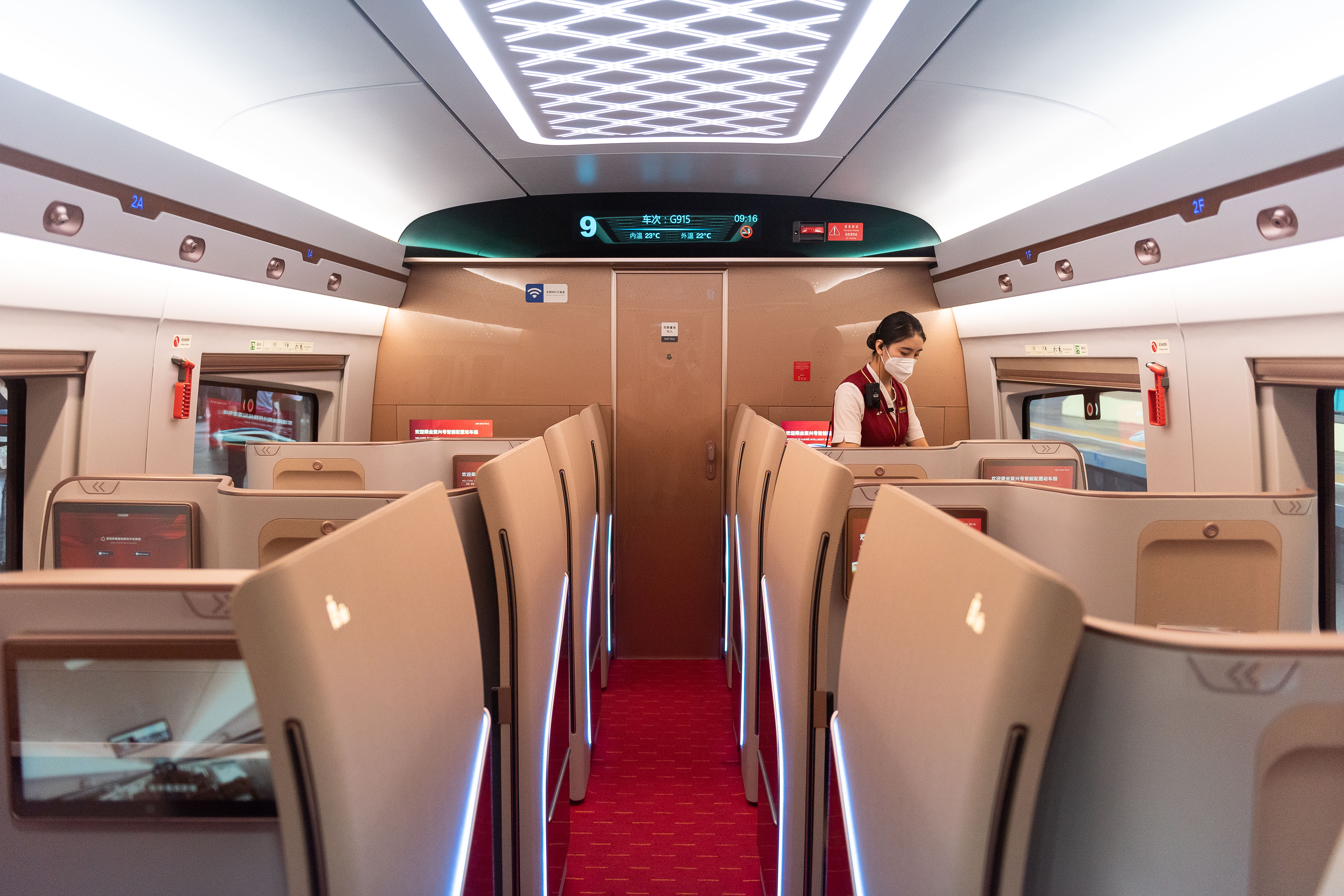
Business-class cabin of a China Railway CR400BF-GZ electric multiple unit which features staggered seats.

Business class is the highest class of service in China high-speed rail, while first class and second class are the more affordable options. Business class passengers have access to a pre-departure lounge if available. Train seats of business class are arranged in 1-1 or 2-1 configuration with fully enclosed seats. Free meals, unlimited snacks, and beverages are provided for the business class passengers throughout the journey.

Eurostar also offers business-class accommodation on their rail services – named "Business Premier", the seats are similar to the premium economy "Standard Premier" offering (wider seats with more legroom and greater recline compared to economy "standard class") but include faster check-in, boarding and a full meal service, among other features. Chiltern Railways offers a business zone on selected services.

== See also ==
- Aircraft cabin
- Airline seat
- Economy class
- Hypermobility (travel)
- First class
- IATA class codes
- Premium economy
