= 1861 in Sweden =

- Decades: 1840s; 1850s; 1860s; 1870s; 1880s
- See also: Other events of 1861; Timeline of Swedish history

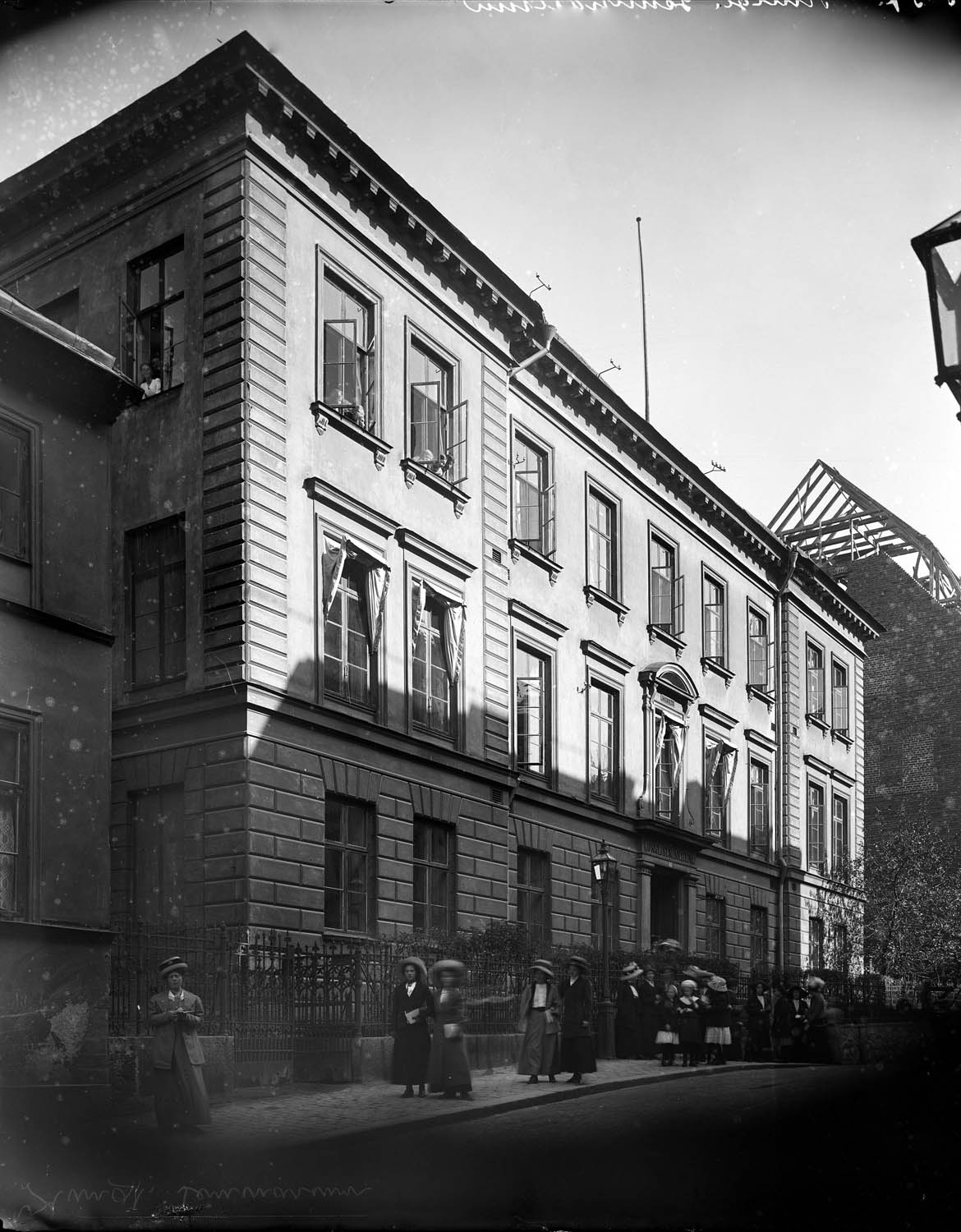

Events from the year 1861 in Sweden

== Incumbents ==
- Monarch – Charles XV

== Events ==
- A decision is taken to construct Strandvägen in Stockholm.
- The inauguration of the women teachers' training college Högre lärarinneseminariet, the first institution of higher learning open to women in Sweden.
- The dentist profession is opened to women.
- Danviken Hospital is closed.
- March - The king grants the con artist Helga de la Brache an annual pension from the foreign department of 2,400 Swedish riksdaler a year, (the amount, from the beginning 1.200, was made larger in December 1869).

== Births ==
- 5 January - Anna Pettersson, lawyer (died 1929)
- 2 June - Concordia Selander, actress and theater manager (died 1935)
- 24 April - Hedda Andersson, second female doctor in Sweden (died 1950)
- 14 May - Valborg Olander, politician (died 1943)
- 29 October - Karolina Olsson, hibernator (died 1950)
- 11 November - Elsa Eschelsson, first female doctor of Laws (died 1911)

== Deaths ==
- 17 January - Malla Silfverstolpe, salonnière (born 1782)
- 21 February - Lars Levi Læstadius, Sami writer
- 6 March - Carl Henrik Cantzler, Stockholm grosshandlare and tobacco manufacturer
- 8 April - Johan Henrik Munktell, industrialist and pianist
- 9 June - Count Carl Axel Löwenhielm, diplomat, army officer, and member of the Council of State
- 30 September - Per August Flensburg, Malmö businessman and manufacturer
