= Amanda Christensen =

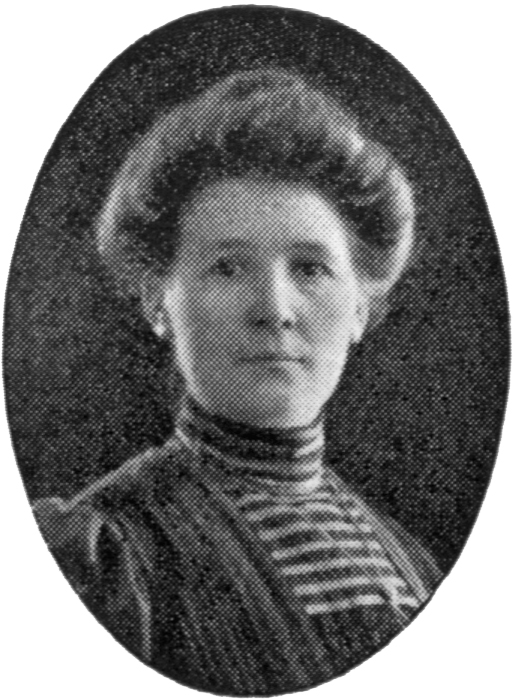
- Born: Amanda Charlotta Svensson; 11 March 1863; Frustuna, Sweden
- Died: 6 February 1928 (aged 64); Nice, France
- Occupations: Fashion designer, businesswoman
- Known for: Founding Amanda Christensen AB (1885); Röda Sigillet necktie label

Amanda Charlotta Christensen, née Svensson (11 March 1863, Frustuna - 6 February 1928, Nice) was a Swedish fashion designer and business person. She founded the firm Amanda Christensen AB (1885), which has a Royal warrant of appointment since 1949, and created the necktie label Röda Sigillet ('Red Seal').

== Life ==
Christensen was the daughter of a farmer in Vårdinge by Gnesta. In 1883, she moved to Stockholm to become a teacher, but was instead employed as a cravat seamstress in the tailor firm Edén.

In 1885, she started her own tailoring firm for men's accessories, initially with only two workers in her employ. At first, she manufactured only white bow ties (for full evening dress); later, the production of black bow ties (for semi-formal dress) was added. Christensen gradually expanded, with more clients and employees, gaining sellers outside of the capital. After a study trip abroad in 1890, she began a major expansion, with ten employees, and considerably widening the range of styles manufactured, including cravats and other neck-wear, in many new colors and models. She manufactured cravats and ties in silk in a period when silk cravats and ties, had, until then, been unusual in Sweden. She arranged supply of the silk fabrics from agents in France and Italy. Christensen continued to travel abroad for study and business regularly, in later years with her son, Rudolf. In the early 1900s, she launched her own brand, Röda Sigillet.

Christensen married the Swedish artist Christian Christensen in the 1880s.

Christensen's son, Rupert, took over the day-to-day operation of the company following her retirement in 1909. She spent her latter years engaged in flower breeding and extensive reading; she moved to a villa in Nice in 1926. The company she founded, which became a public limited company (Swedish: aktiebolag or AB) in 1909, continued with the involvement of her descendants until 1999, when it was sold to Jens Engvall AB.
