= Carl d'Unker =

Swedish artist (1828–1866)

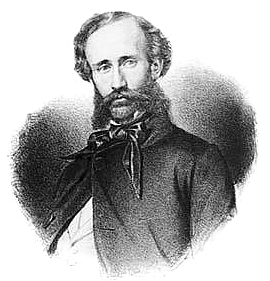
- Born: Carl Henrik Lützow d'Unker; 9 February 1828; Stockholm, Sweden
- Died: 24 March 1866 (aged 38); Düsseldorf, Germany
- Known for: Painter
- Movement: Düsseldorf school of painting

Carl Henrik Lützow d'Unker (9 February 1828 – 24 March 1866) was a Swedish artist. He was the first in a large number of Swedish artists who studied in Düsseldorf between 1850 and 1870. He was known mostly as a socially oriented genre painter whose works depicted contemporary subjects, such as waiting rooms at railway stations or scenes from pawnshops.

== Biography ==
He was born in Stockholm, Sweden. His father, Carl Henning d'Unker, was a Norwegian soldier, while his mother, Anna Christina Brunstedt, was a Swedish citizen. He began his career as a soldier and served in the Svea Life Guards for a short time. In 1848 he volunteered for the First Schleswig War (1848–1849). Shortly after his return to Sweden he abandoned his military career in favor of an artistic one. He moved to Düsseldorf from 1851-1853 to study painting where he became a student of Karl Ferdinand Sohn (1805–1867).

During the years 1856 and 1857, he conducted study trips in Westphalia, Belgium and Paris. He attended the art academy in Amsterdam during 1859. He became a very popular artist on the continent. From 1861 he suffered from sickness in his right arm and was forced to paint with his left arm. He made a brief visit to Sweden in 1865 and was appointed professor by King Charles XV of Sweden. He died the following year in Düsseldorf.

== Personal life ==
On 25 June 1859, he married Clara Wilhelmine Therese Karoline Antonie Schnitzler (b. 1839), the daughter of master builder Peter Heinrich Gregor Anton Schnitzler (1796–1873), after which he was able to live a carefree life financially. In 1864 he and his wife had a son, Detlev Wilhelm Albert d'Unker Luetzow.

== Gallery ==
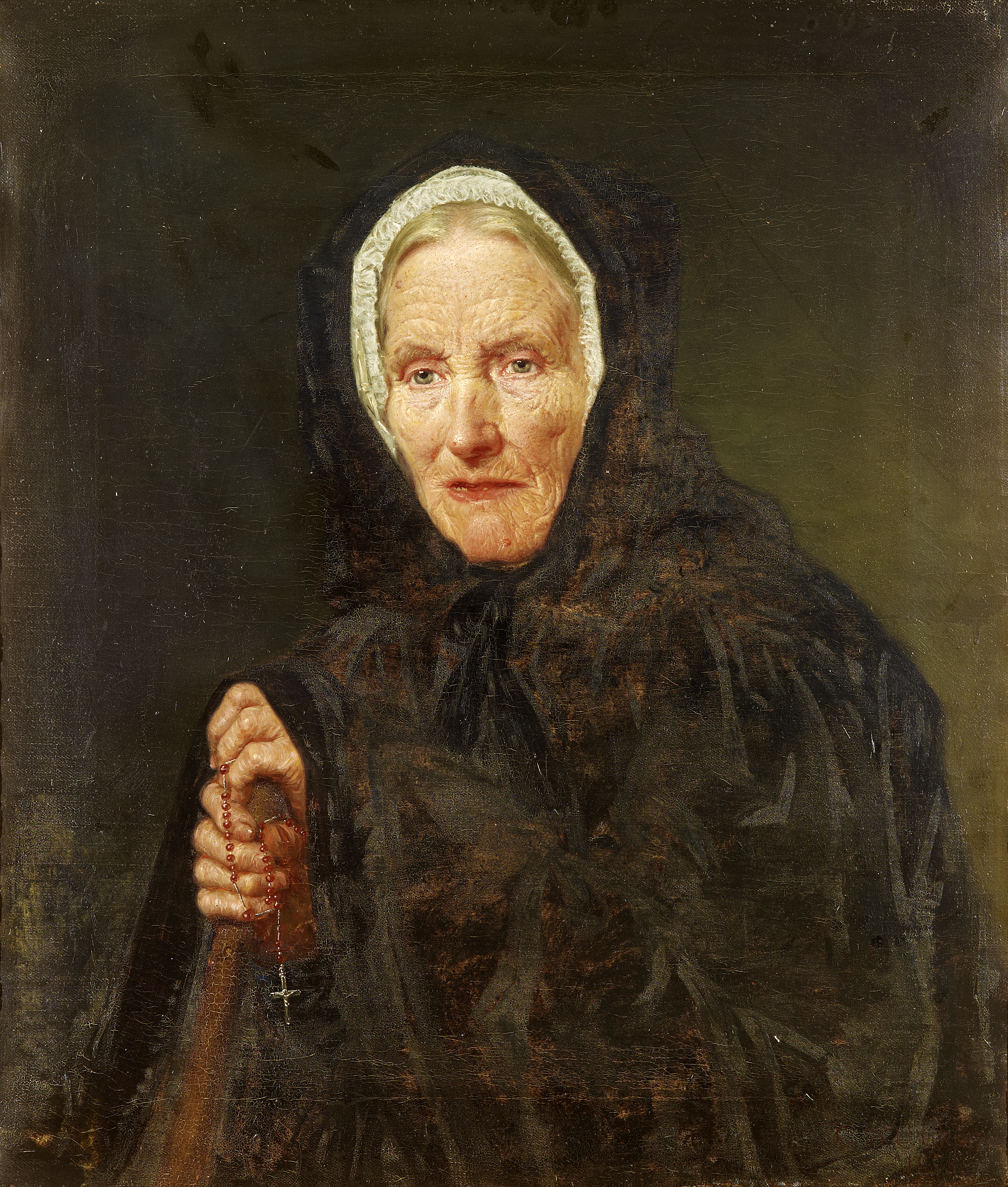
Woman with a Rosary (1853)

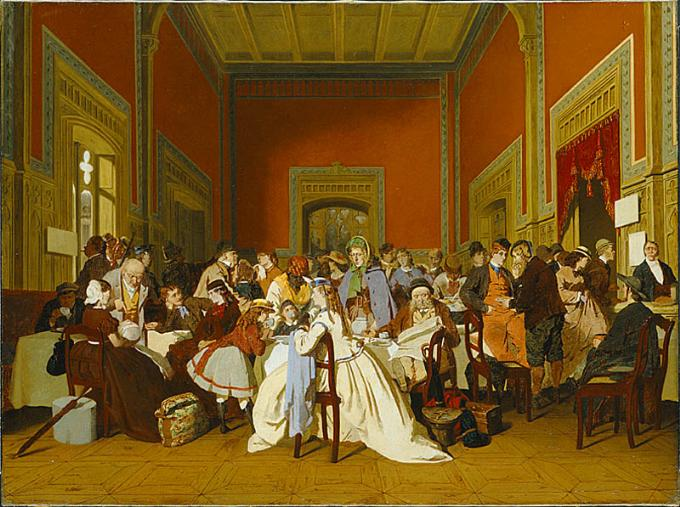
Second-class waiting room (ca 1865)

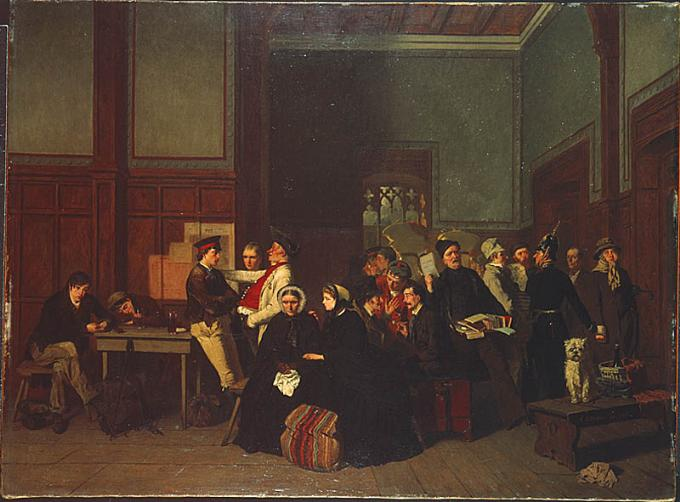
Third-class waiting room II (1865)

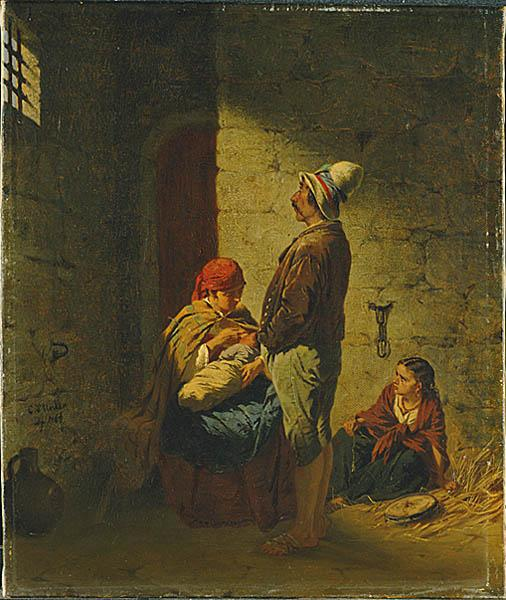
Gypsy Family in Prison (1864)

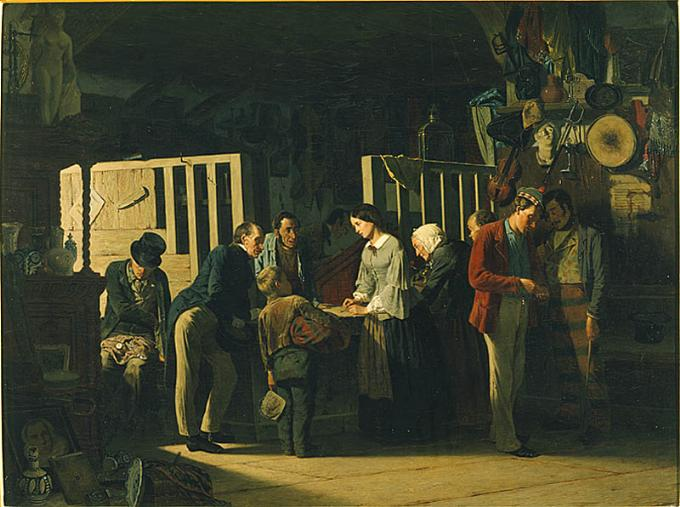
The Pawnshop II (1859)

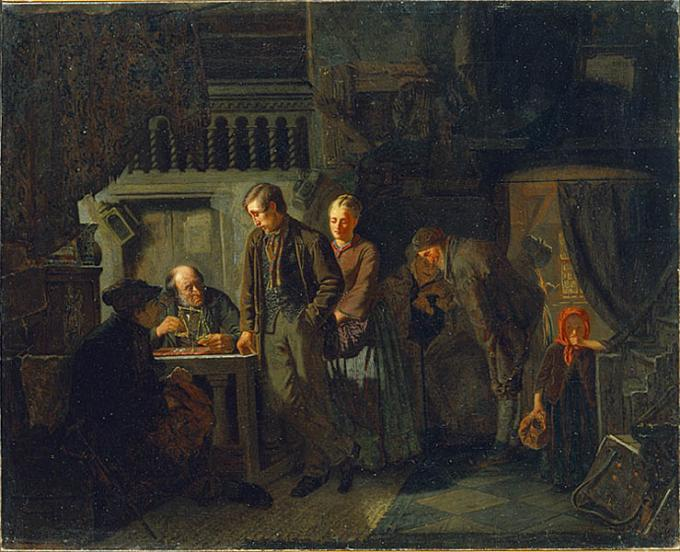
The Pawnshop (V) (1860)

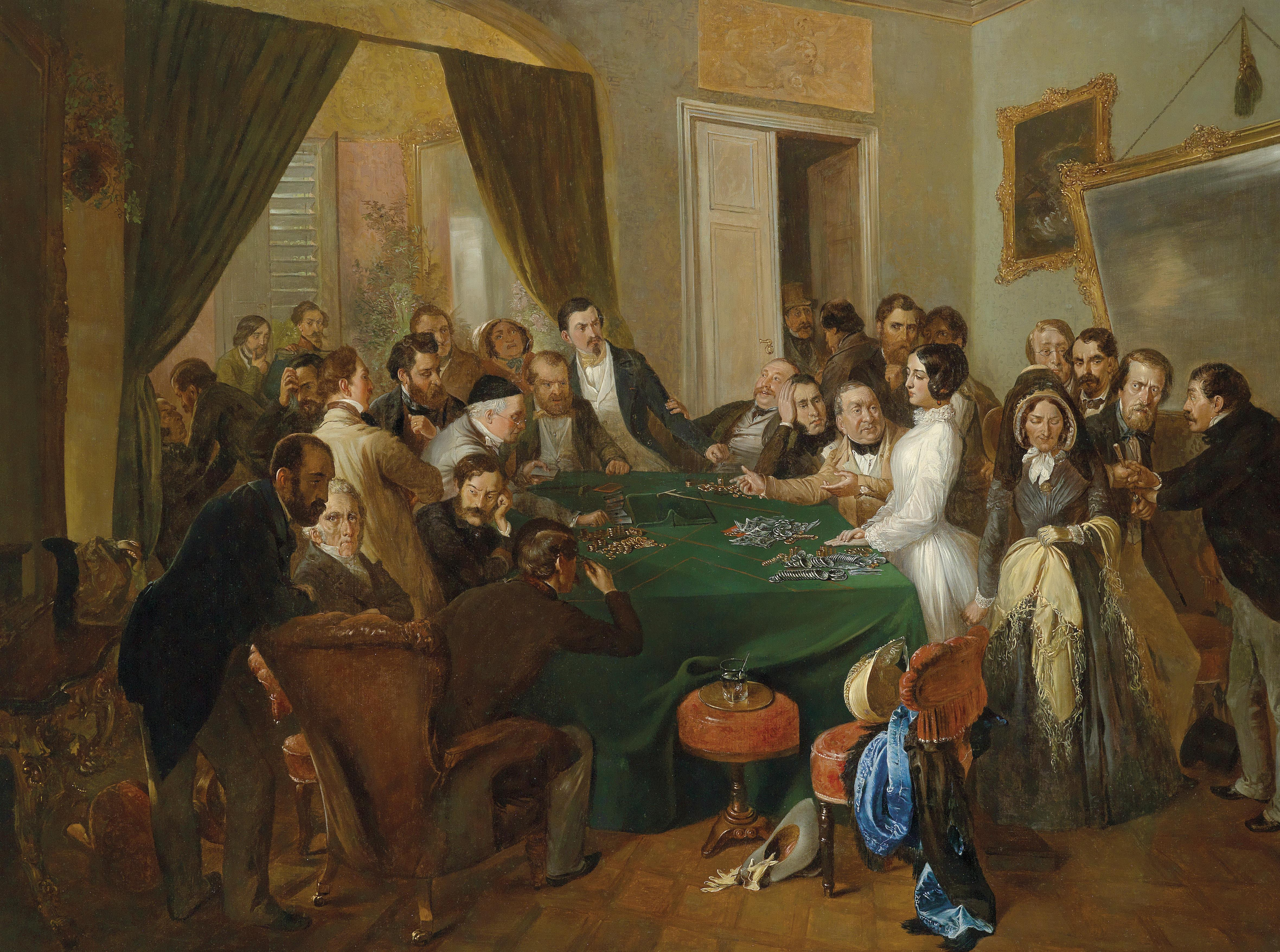
A gambling party - illustration to scene 1 of La traviata.
