= Carl Hagberg =

Carl Hagberg may refer to:

- Carl August Hagberg (1810–1864), Swedish linguist and translator
- Carl Peter Hagberg (1778–1841), Swedish minister and orator
