= Ahlen (surname) =

- Johan Petter Åhlén (1879–1939), Swedish curler and businessman
- John von Ahlen, Australian musician and lead vocalist of Parralox
- Hanna Åhlén (born 1994), Swedish handball player
- Louise Ahlén (1857–1913), Swedish song writer
- Markus von Ahlen (born 1971), German football manager and player
- Mikael Ahlén, Swedish ice hockey player

== See also ==
- Ahrén
