= Uppland Runic Inscription 701 =

Coordinates: 59.5213°N 17.3215°E

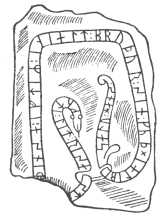
- Created: unknown
- Discovered: Originally Veckholms county, now lost, Uppland, Sweden
- Rundata ID: U 701
- Runemaster: unknown

Text – Native
- Old Norse: Guti let ræisa st[æin] þennsa æftiʀ I[ng]iald, broður sinn. Guð hialpi salu hans.

Translation
- Goti had this stone raised in memory of Ingjaldr, his brother. May God help his soul.

Uppland Runic Inscription 701 or U 701, and also known as Kynge stone, is a runestone that is now lost. It was recorded in a drawing in the 17th century by Johan Hadorph and P. Helgonius, as well as Johannes Haquini Rhezelius. Richard Dybeck took up the search for the missing U 701 in 1860 but was not able to find it. It is believed that U 701 was carved by the artist who made runic inscriptions U 700 and U 702.

The recorded text ends with a prayer that uses the Norse word salu. This word, which means "soul", was imported from English and first used on a different inscription during the tenth century.

== Transliteration of runic text into Latin letters ==
[kuti : lit : risa st... þinsa : iftiʀ : i-ialt : bruþur : sin : kuþ × ialibi salu : hans *]

== See also ==
- Joint Nordic database for runic inscriptions
- List of runestones
- Runic alphabet
