= Lundholm =

Lundholm is a Swedish surname. Notable people with the surname include:

- Bengt Lundholm (born 1955), Swedish retired professional ice hockey player
- Carl Lundholm, American athletic director at the University of New Hampshire, for whom Lundholm Gym is named
- Mathias Lundholm (1785–1860) Swedish violinist and conductor
- Stig Lundholm (1917–2009), Swedish chess master

== See also ==
- Lundholm Gym, multi-purpose arena in Durham, New Hampshire named for Carl Lundholm
