= Opening of the Riksdag =

Ceremony that marks the start of a new year of the Riksdag

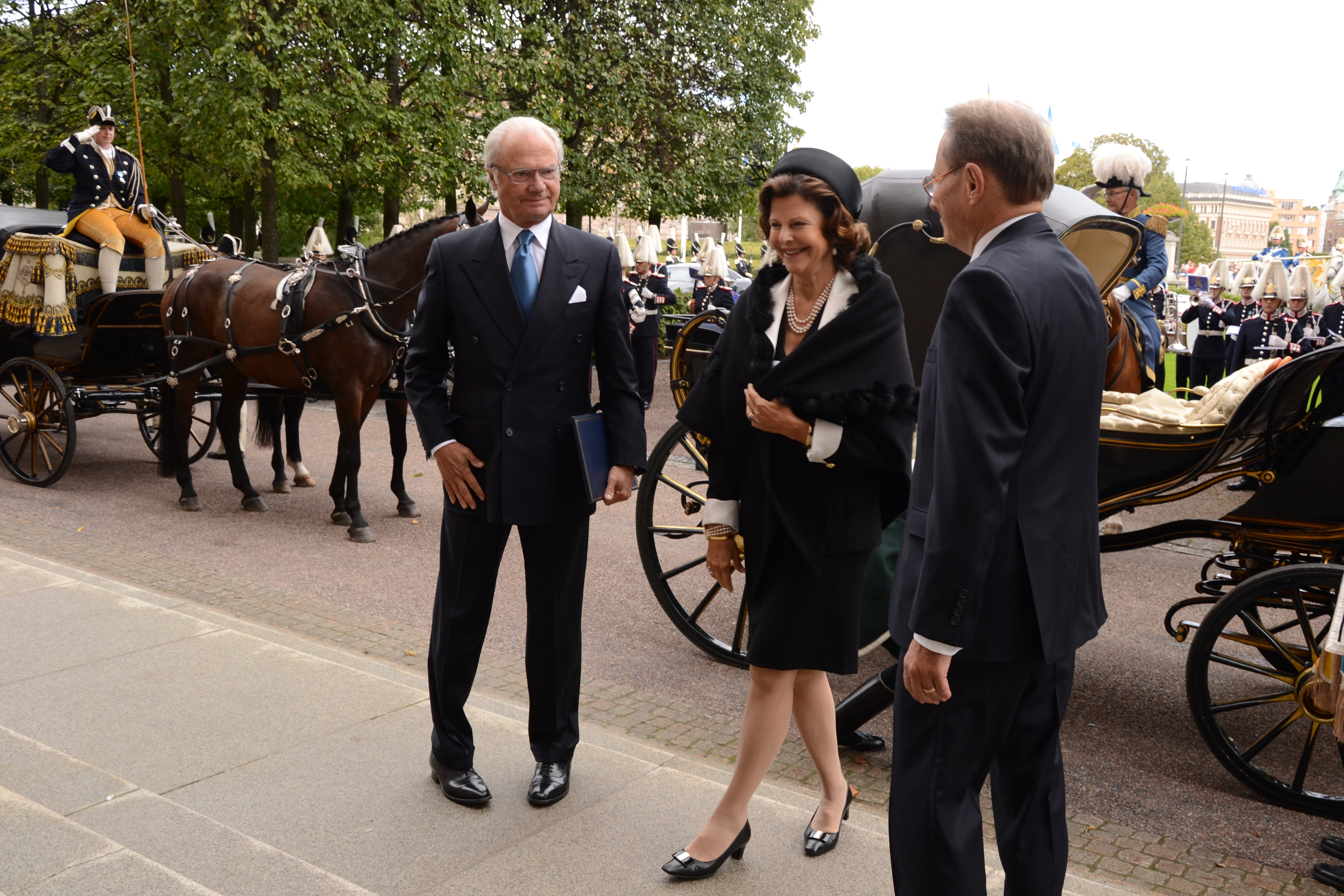
The King arrives for the 2011 opening.

The Opening of the Riksdag Session (Swedish: Riksmötets Öppnande) is an annual ceremony in the Kingdom of Sweden to mark the start of a new parliamentary year for the Swedish Riksdag. The current ceremony was first held in 1975, replacing an older ceremony known as the Solemn Opening of the Riksdag (Swedish: Riksdagens högtidliga öppnande) that had been held since the 17th century. It is held every year in September. During the ceremony the monarch declares the new session open and the Prime Minister makes a speech outlining the government’s priorities for the upcoming year.

== Church service ==
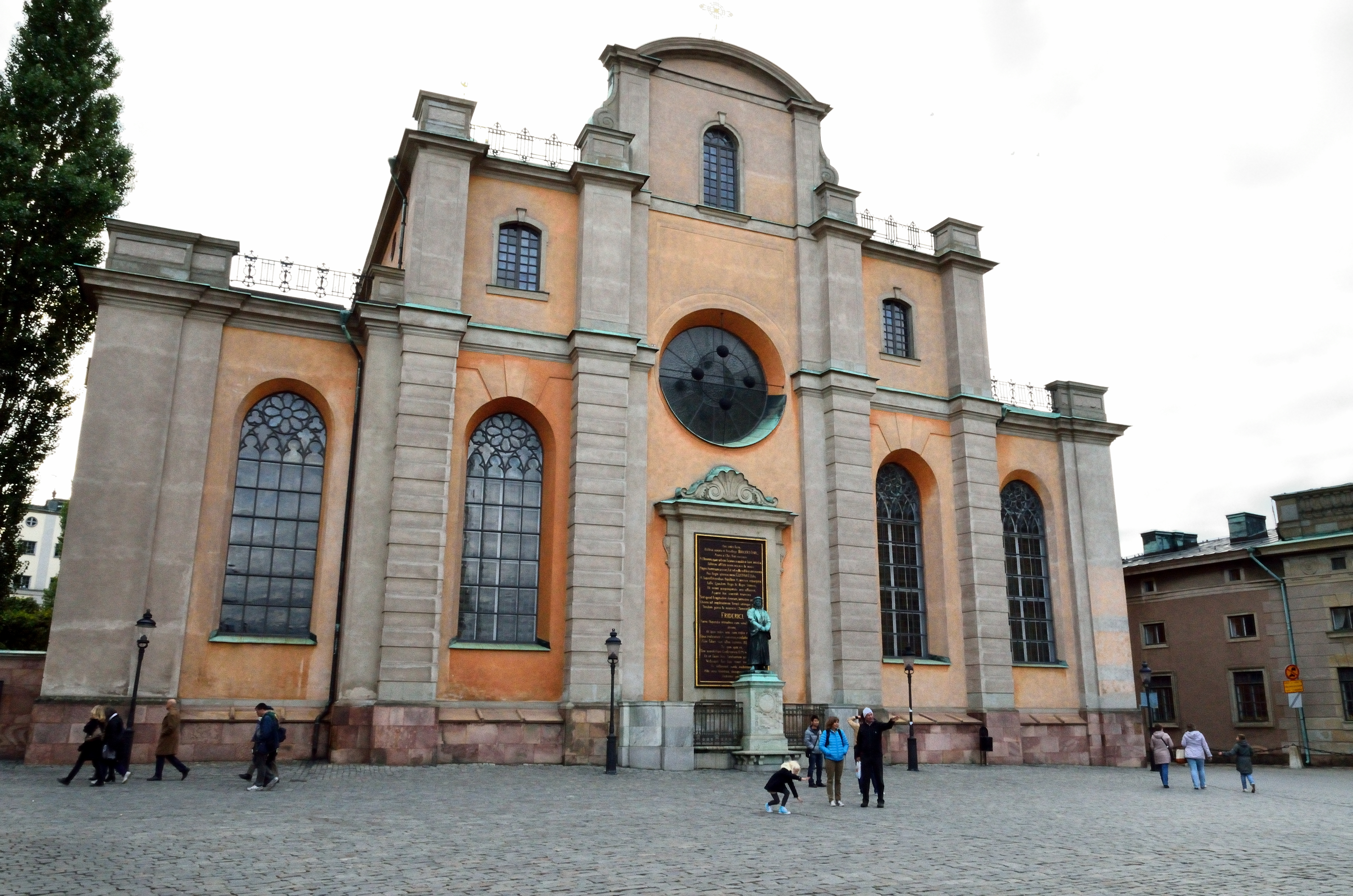
Storkyrkan, where the service is held.

Before the ceremony starts, the members of the Riksdag attend a roll call and walk to Storkyrkan where a special church service is held. This church service is also attended by the royal family seated in a special box close to the altar. It is common for family members of members of the Riksdag also participate during this event. The service is usually led by the Archbishop of Uppsala, but may also be led by the Bishop of Stockholm.

After the church service the members of the Riksdag walk back to Parliament House and enter through its main entrance, making their way up the grand staircase.

== Ceremony ==
The royal family make their way to the Parliament building in coaches together with a mounted escort provided by the Life Guards. The King and Queen traditionally make this journey in the State Coach from 1897. Outside the Riksdag Grenadiers of the Life Regiment stand guard. When the royal family arrives at Riksplan trumpet fanfares announce their arrival and the King and Queen are greeted by the Speaker of the Riksdag. They then make their way inside the building.

Once the King enters the Riksdag Chamber the royal anthem is sung. While it is sung the members of the royal family and the prime minister are seated at the front of the chamber where the lecterns used for debates are usually located while the King stands facing the chamber below the Speakers Presidium. When the anthem finishes the Speaker asks to king to declare the new Riksdag session open, following which the King takes his place behind the rostrum and delivers a speech. This speech may include topics the King thinks are extra important for the upcoming parliamentary year and words of encouragement to the members of the Riksdag. After he is done he declares the new Riksdag session open and is seated with the rest of his family.

The Prime Minister then, on request of the Speaker, delivers their Declaration of Government. This speech outlines the governments priorities over the upcoming parliamentary year. It can be compared with the speech from the throne, held in nations like the United Kingdom, the Netherlands and Norway. To finish of the ceremony the national anthem Du gamla, du fria is sung and the royal family depart the chamber to the tunes of Grand Marche travelling back to the palace in the same manner they arrived.

Following the end of the ceremony the Speaker calls a debate about the contents of the declaration of government.

It is customary that attending royals wear black and white. This traditions stems from the old ceremony during which black and white court dress was worn by the royal family.

== Variations ==
Between the introduction of the ceremony in 1975 and 1983 the ceremony was held the House of Culture while the Riksdag Building was being renovated to make room for the unicameral Riksdag established in 1971. During this time some variations were made to the ceremony. For example the royal family travelled by car to the event. Also when entering the House of Culture the King and his entourage used the escalator to get to the Riksdag chamber.

Due to the Covid-19 pandemic the number of attendees was significantly lower at 2020 ceremony. Only half of the government attended and the King and Queen were accompanied by just the Marshal of the Realm. No other members of the royal family were in attendance. The journey to the Riksdag Building was also made by car this year.

As of February 2024 the King has opened all Riksdag Sessions since 1975 never missing a single ceremony. Should the King however be unable to attend the Speaker is to declare the new session open on his behalf.

== Former ceremony ==
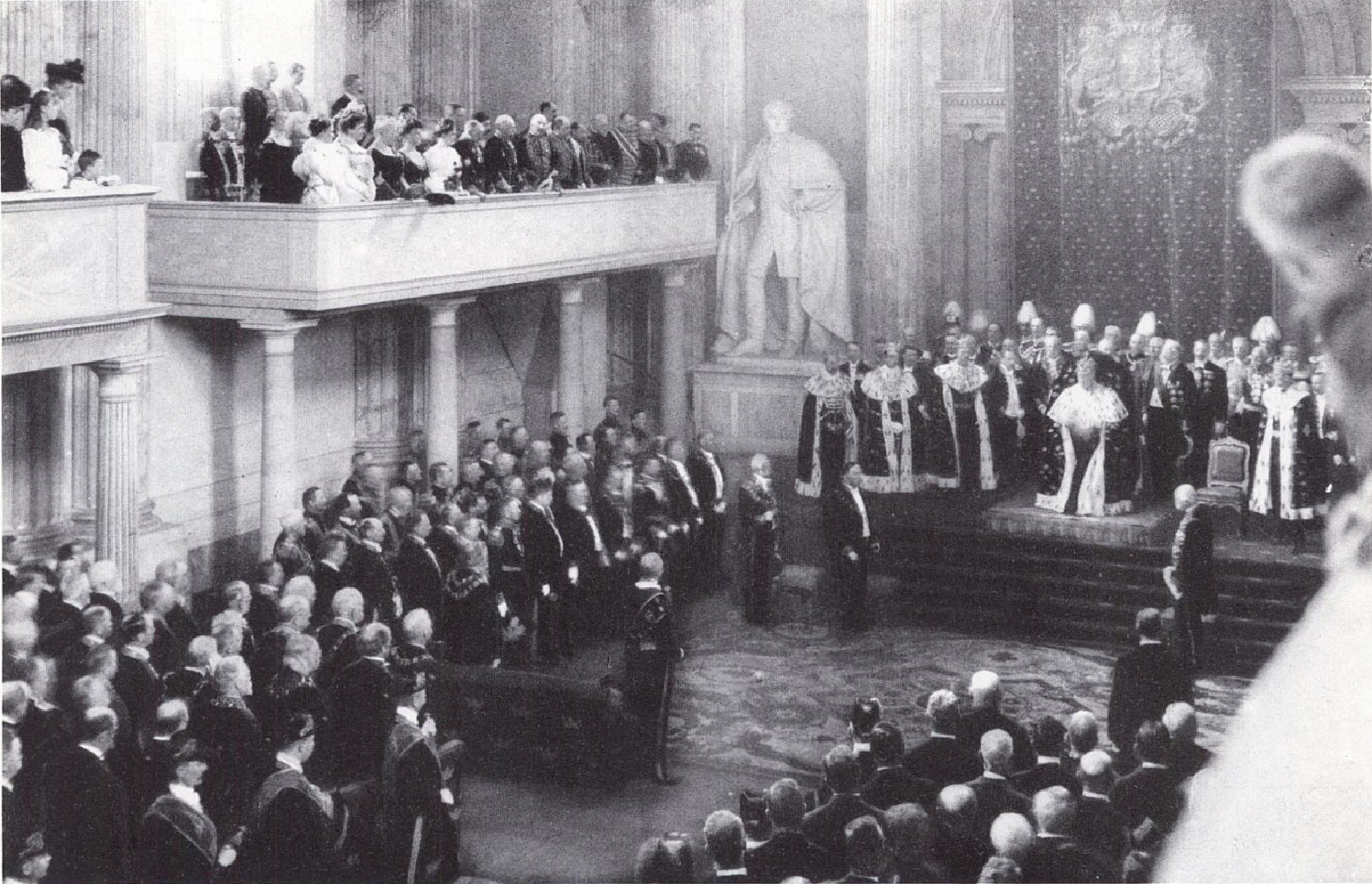
Oscar II opens parliament.

Before 1975 another ceremony, known as the Solemn opening of the Riksdag was held. The ceremony was held in the Hall of State of the Stockholm Royal Palace and had it roots in the 17th century. This ceremony was originally, just like the current one, preceded by a church service in Storkyrkan. Later this service however moved to the Royal Chapel just opposite the Hall of State.

This ceremony was steeped in tradition and full of symbolism. It was attended by members of the Riksdag, the government, the royal court and royal family, the diplomatic corps and members of the orders of chivalry. The ceremony began with the Drabants of Charles XI entering the hall followed by the monarch and their entourage, consisting of members of government, the royal court and royal family. After entering the royal anthem was sung and the monarch took their seat on the Silver Throne, which after 1907 was covered by the coronation robe of Oscar II. Also after 1907 the crown and scepter were placed on cushions to the left and right of the throne. Before that they had been worn by the monarch. The use of robes and coronets by attending princes also stopped after 1907.

The monarch was then handed a speech outlining the governments priorities by a Chamberlain. They then nodded to the Marshal of the Realm who hit their staff in the floor to mark the beginning of the speech and order the attendees to rise. Then the monarch read the speech from the throne and departed the Hall of State with their entourage.

This ceremony was last held in January 1974 when king Carl XVI Gustaf read the final speech from the throne. With the introduction of the 1974 Instrument of Government in 1975 the old ceremony was abolished and replaced with the current one.
