= Karlstorp =

Settlement in Vetlanda Municipality, Sweden

Coordinates: 57.4571°N 14.9122°E

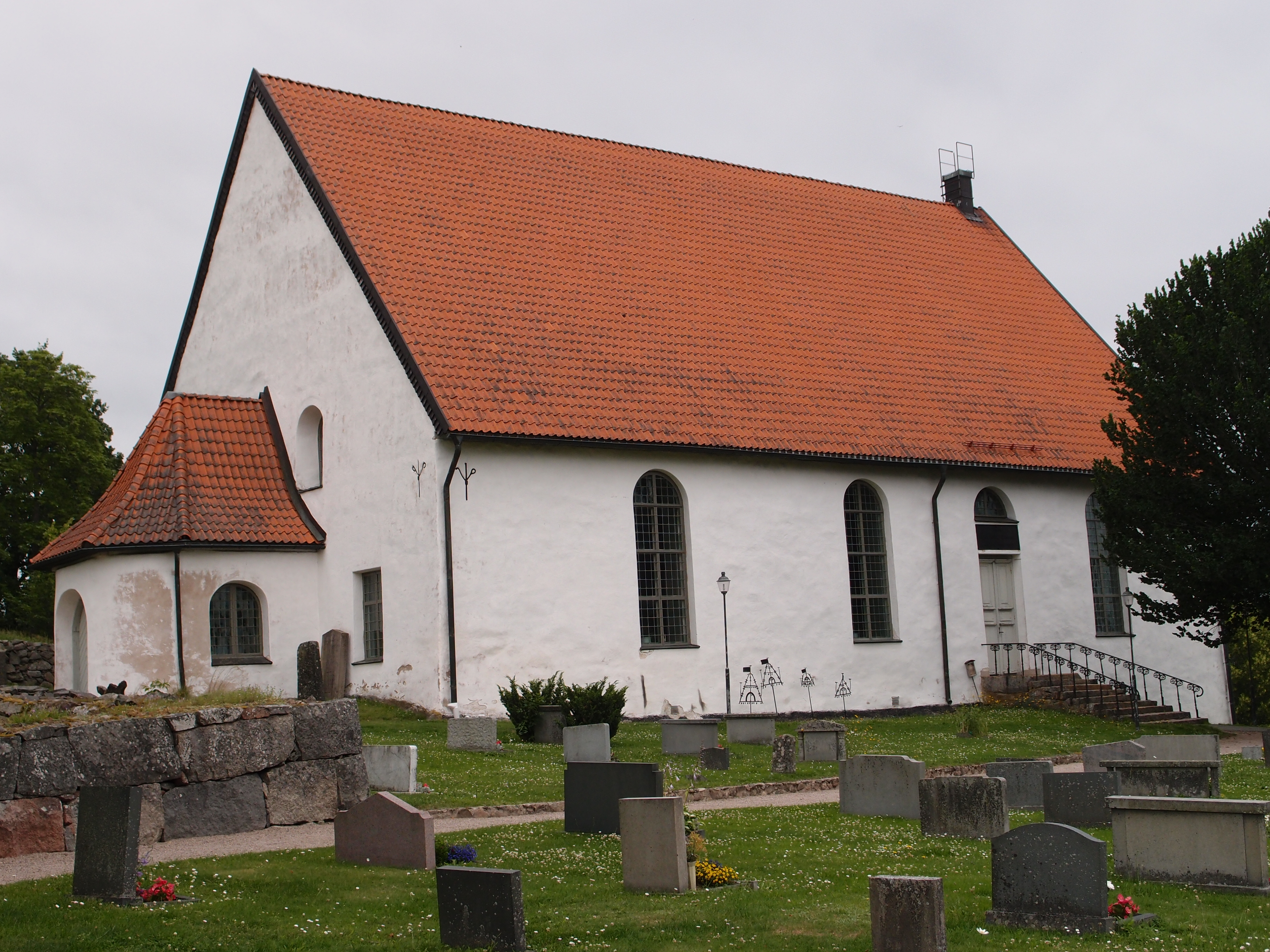
Karlstorp Church

Karlstorp, spelled Carlstorp in old writings, is a small village in Vetlanda Municipality in Jönköping County, in southern Sweden. It lies 42 km from the town of Vetlanda and 18 km from Mariannelund, and has a population of about 50. Otto Lindblad, composer of Kungssången, the Swedish royal anthem, came from Karlstorp.
