= Gustafs skål =

1772 song by Carl Michael Bellman

English: Gustav's toast
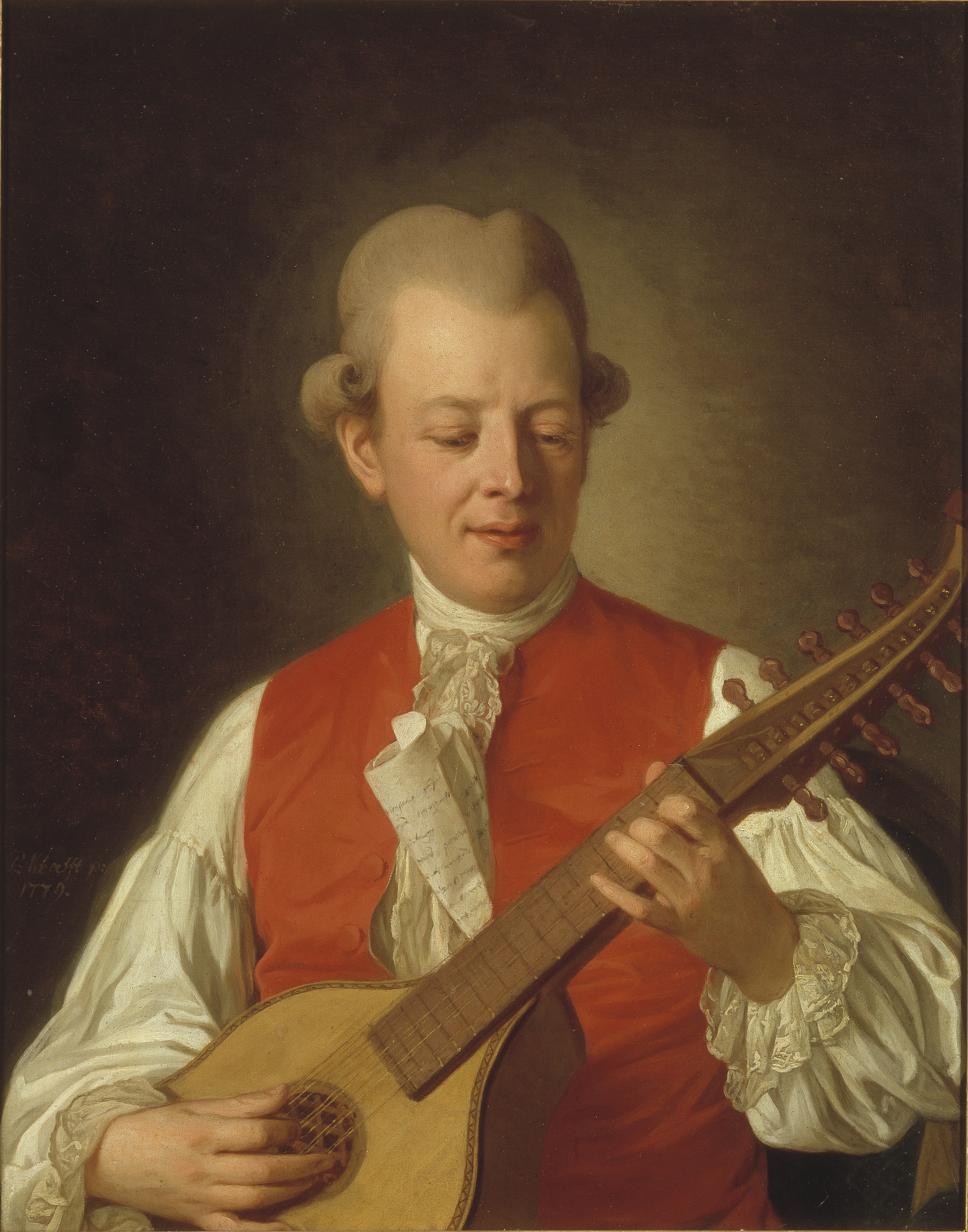
- C. M. Bellman
- Royal anthem of Sweden in the Gustavian era
- Lyrics: Carl Michael Bellman, 19 August 1772
- Music: Carl Michael Bellman, 19 August 1772

"Gustafs skål" (Gustav's toast) is a song written by Carl Michael Bellman as a salutation to Gustav III of Sweden, following the Revolution of 1772, in which Gustav made himself an autocrat and ended the Age of Liberty. The king very much liked the song and informally it came to function as his royal anthem.

== Lyrics ==
1. 𝄆 Gustafs skål!
Den bäste Kung, som Norden äger
Han ej tål!
At vigtskåln ojämt väger. 𝄇
𝄆 God och glad!
Han Ilskans röst föraktar
Samt afvaktar och betraktar
Dårskap i sin grad. 𝄇

2. 𝄆 Sådan Kung!
Är värd att styra Sveriges öden
Rask och ung!
Ej rådlös uti nöden. 𝄇
𝄆 Vasa Ätt!
Har aldrig lärt att svika,
Aldrig tvika, men at fika
Till at göra rätt. 𝄇

𝄆 Gustav's Toast!
The greatest king of the north:
He can't rest,
While injustice rules. 𝄇
𝄆 Decent and cheerful,
He detests anger
and waits, and studies
foolishness in progress. 𝄇

𝄆 A king like he
Is worthy of steering Sweden's destiny
Bold and young
Never irresolute in need. 𝄇
𝄆 Of Vasa dynasty
Has never learnt deceit
Never hesitate but rather do
What is just and fair. 𝄇

== See also ==
- Bevare Gud vår kung, royal anthem of Sweden (1805–1893)
- Kungssången, Swedish royal anthem since 1893
