= Christian Eric Fahlcrantz =

Swedish theologian & author (1780–1866)

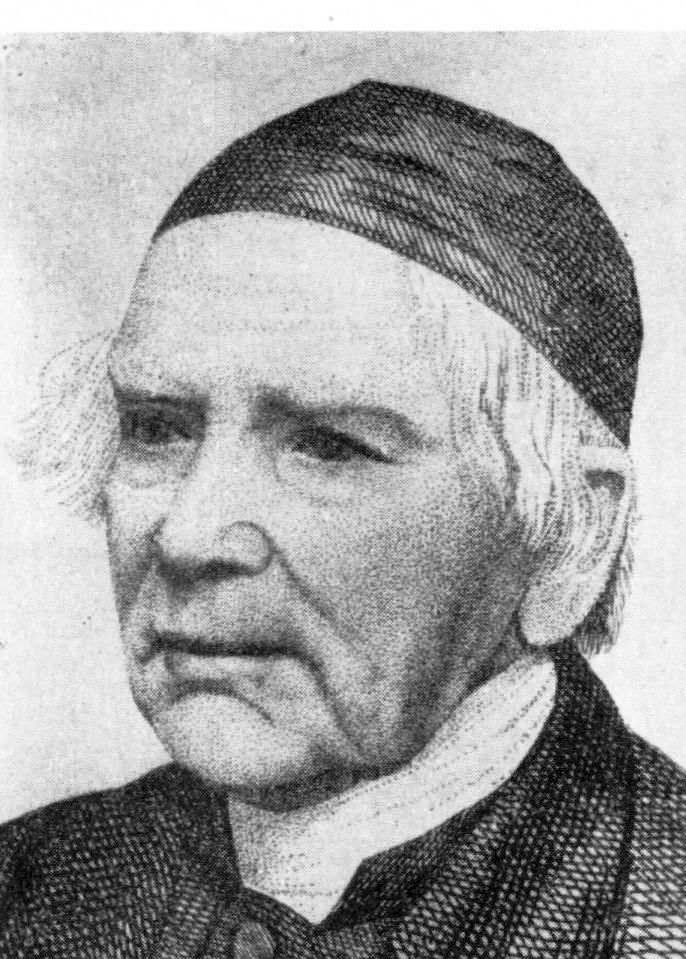
Christian Eric Fahlcrantz

Christian Eric Fahlcrantz (30 August 1780 – 6 August 1866) was a Swedish theologian and author.

== Biography ==
Fahlcrantz was born at the parish of Stora Tuna in Dalarna, Sweden. He was the son of Johan Fahlcrantz and Gustafva de Brenner. His father was a vicar in Kungsåra parish. His brother Axel Magnus Fahlcrantz (1780–1854) was a sculptor. His brother Carl Johan Fahlcrantz (1774–1861) was a landscape painter. His great-grandfather Elias Brenner (1647–1717) was an artist. His great-grandmother Sophia Elisabet Brenner (1659–1730) was a poet.

In 1804 he entered the University of Uppsala receiving his Master's degree in 1815. In 1821 he became tutor in Arabic, and in 1825 professor of Oriental languages. The following year, he received his Doctor of Theology and entered the rural deanery at Hagunda in the Diocese of Uppsala.

In 1825, he published Noacks Ark, a successful satire on the literary and social life of his time, followed in 1826 by a second part. In 1835 Fahlcrantz brought out the first part of his epic of Ansgarius, which was completed in 1846, in 14 cantos. In 1842 he was made a member of the Swedish Academy. In 1849 he was made Bishop of the Diocese of Västerås, and left the professorship in Uppsala. His next literary work was an archaeological study on Västerås Cathedral.

In the course of the years 1858-1861 appeared the five volumes of Rom förr och nu, a theological polemic, mainly directed against the Jesuits. His complete works (7 vols., Örebro, 1863-1866) were issued mainly under his own superintendence.

== Personal life ==
Fahlcrantz was married in 1847 to Aurora Wilhelmina Valerius (1819-1916). They were the parents of Carl Johan Fahlcrantz (1849-1915), founder of the book publisher Fahlcrantz & Co., Axel Erik Valerius Fahlcrantz (1851-1925) who was a landscape painter, Christian David Ansgarius Fahlcrantz (1853-1927) who was adjunct lecturer in Borås and Martin Wilhelm Fahlcrantz (1859-1936) who was county secretary in Nyköping.

Christian Eric Fahlcrantz died at Västerås in 1866 and his wife in 1916.

Cultural offices
Preceded by Carl Peter Hagberg	Swedish Academy, Chair No 2; 1842-1866	Succeeded by Gunnar Wennerberg
