= Uppland Runic Inscription 755 =

Coordinates: 59.6674°N 17.2308°E

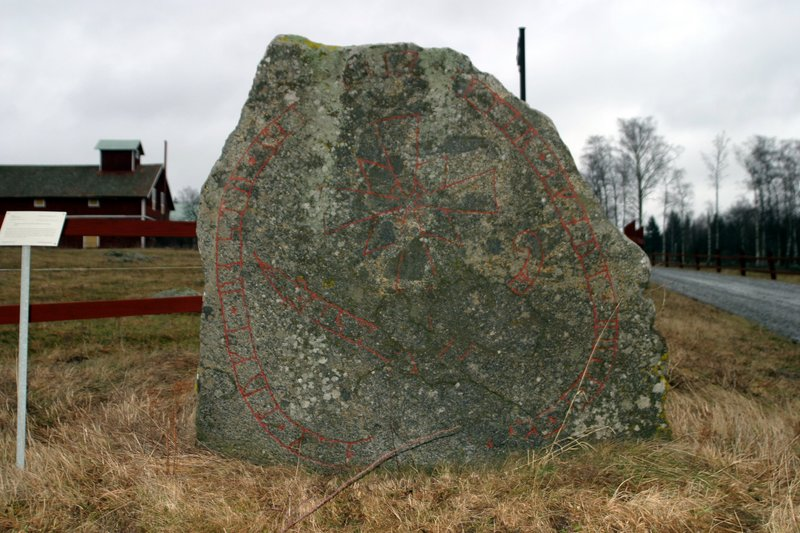
- Created: 11th Century
- Discovered: Kälsta, Uppland, Sweden
- Rundata ID: U 755
- Runemaster: unknown

Text – Native
- Old Norse : Liðsma[ndr](?) ok Toki ræistu stæin þenna æftiʀ Agaut. Byggi i Kælsstaðum.

Translation
- Liðsmaðr(?) and Tóki raised this stone in memory of Ágautr (who) lived in Kelsstaðir.

U 755 is the Rundata designation for a Viking Age memorial runestone located in Kälsta, Uppland, Sweden.

== Description ==
This runestone was first documented by Richard Dybeck, who is known as the author of the lyrics to the Swedish national anthem, in 1860: "The runestone stands between Litslena and Herkeberga Church, so close to the edge of the road by Kalstad - part of the lower inscription has been damaged."

The cross on the stone indicates that Ágautr was a Christian. The name Ágautr does not appear in any other material (either other rune inscriptions or middle age sources). Lidhsmadhr is also an unusual name, there is however a mention on another runestone in nearby Simtuna with this name, on inscription U 1160, which possibly could reference the same person.

The place name Kelsstaðir in the runic text, sometimes read as Kal-taþum, refers to the modern hamlet of Kälsta.

== Inscription ==
A transliteration of the runic inscription is:

+ lis(m)[a]--... auk + tuki + rastu × stain + (þ)i(n)a + aftir + akaut + bu(k)i + i + k[a](l)[staþ](u)m

== See also ==
- List of runestones
