= Brynolf Wennerberg =

Swedish-German painter and graphic designer

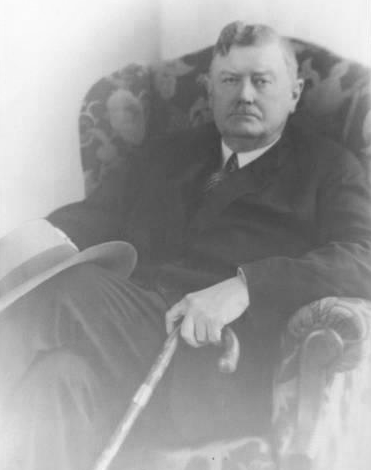
Brynolf Wennerberg (c.1925)

Gunnar Brynolf Wennerberg (12 August 1866 – 13 March 1950) was a Swedish-German painter and graphic designer. He is sometimes referred to as "The Younger", to distinguish him from his father of the same name.

== Biography ==
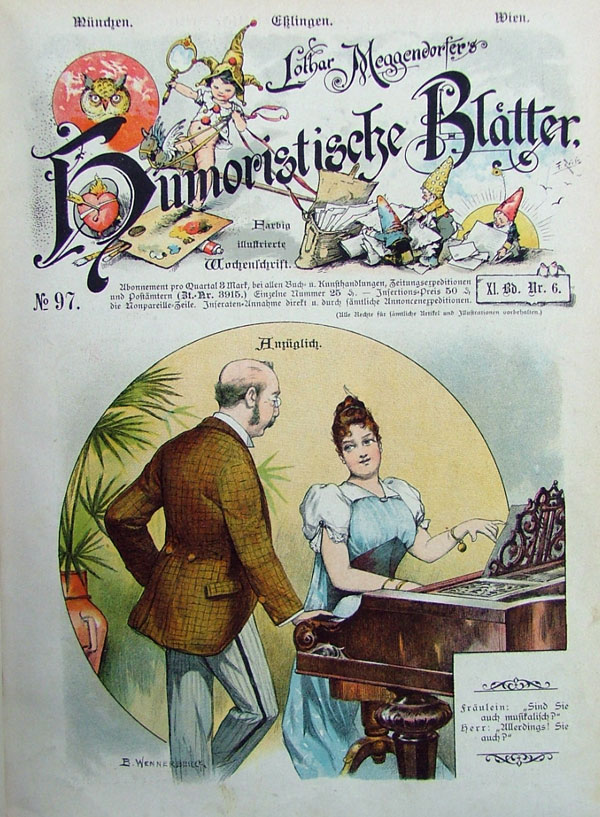
Meggendorfer-Blätter #97

He was born into a landed, aristocratic family in Otterstads Parish, Västergötland. His father, Gunnar Brynolf Wennerberg, was an artist who specialized in animal paintings. Art salons were often held at their home. In 1885, he began his studies at an arts and crafts school in Stockholm. The following year, he transferred to the newly founded Kunstnernes Frie Studieskoler in Copenhagen, where his primary instructor was Peder Severin Krøyer.

In 1888, he moved to Leipzig, which was then the center of the German publishing industry, and worked as a draftsman. There, he met and married Helene Pauline Hermann. They had two daughters. His career began in earnest in 1892, when he began working for the satirical Meggendorfer-Blätter. He would create drawings for them until 1901. In 1898, he designed his first event poster.

Around 1900, he and his family moved to Fürstenfeldbruck. A third daughter was born there in 1902. They moved to Munich in 1905 and, in 1908, he opened his own studio. The following year, he became an illustrator for Simplicissimus, another satirical magazine. He would be associated with them until 1919, and produced 103 illustrations, many of which would be reproduced as postcards.

In 1911, their second daughter, Ellen, died of tuberculosis. Helene was unable to recover from the loss, and their marriage broke up. She died suddenly in 1912, at the age of forty, shortly after Brynolf and their surviving daughters had been granted Bavarian citizenship.

After that, he decided to leave Munich. He travelled to the Isle of Wight, with his youngest daughter, Charlotte, and Anny von Řezníček, widow of the artist Ferdinand von Řezníček, whom he married there. His oldest daughter, Astrid, later joined them. They stayed for only a short time before settling in Paris. When World War I broke out, they were staying at their summer house near Mammern, Switzerland. They were unable to return to France, and all of their belongings there were lost.

From 1915, he lived in Bad Aibling and worked in a studio that was formerly occupied by the portrait painter, Wilhelm Leibl. During the war, he contributed drawings to the humor magazine, Lustige Blätter. In the 1920s and 30s, he produced advertising materials, which featured young, slender women, with a facial expression that became known as the "Wennerberg Smile". For most of his final years, he concentrated on paintings, rather than graphic design. Some of them were simple landscapes of Upper Bavaria.

== Selected paintings ==
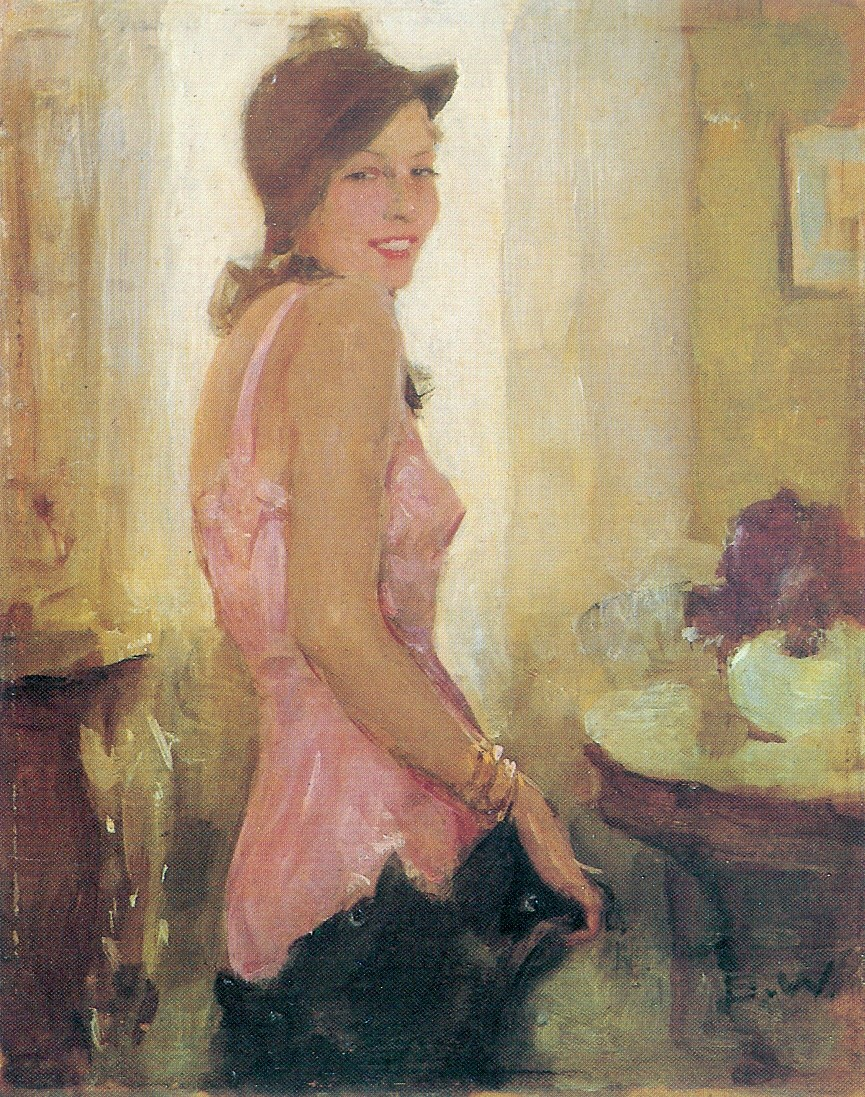
Getting Dressed

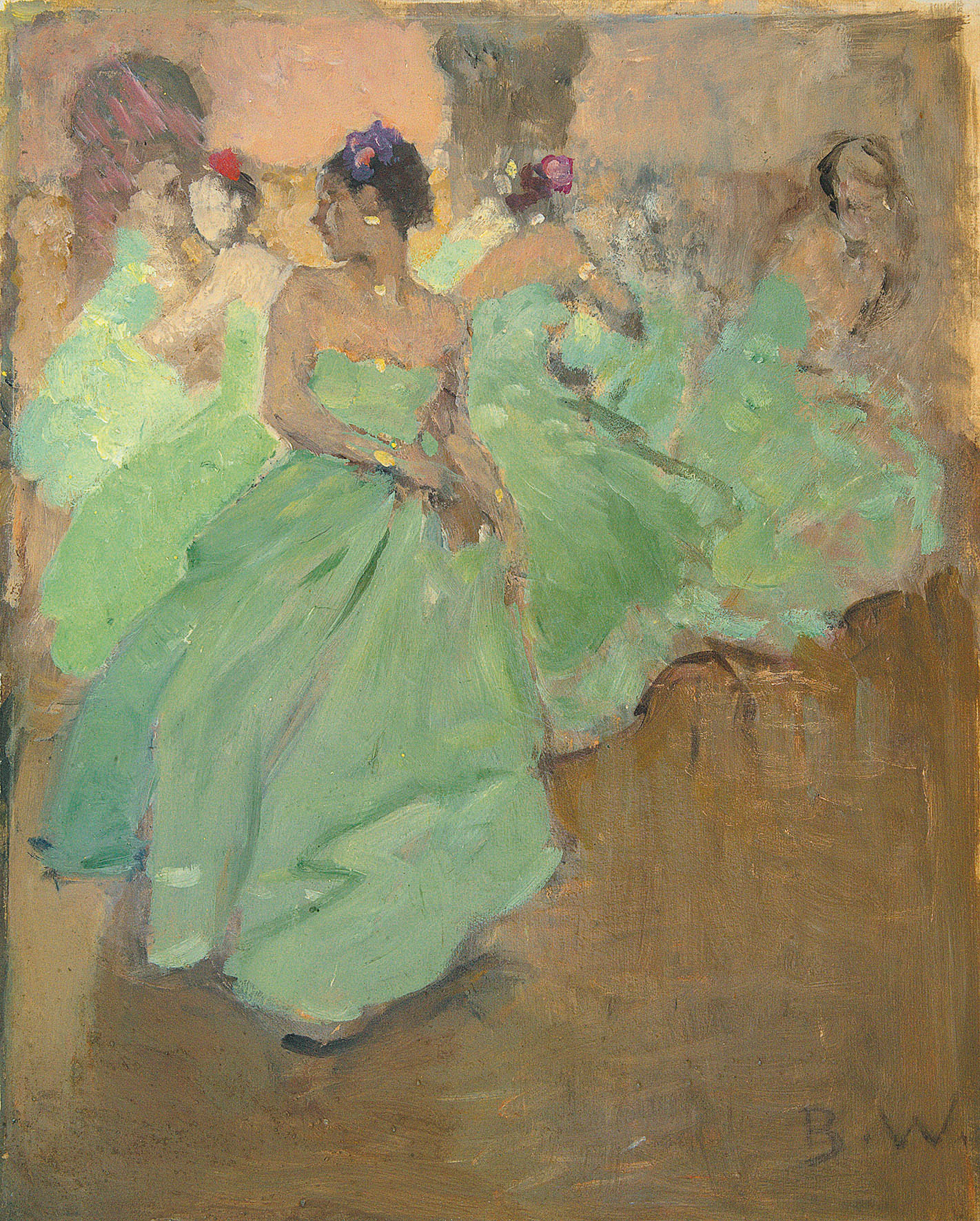
Dancers

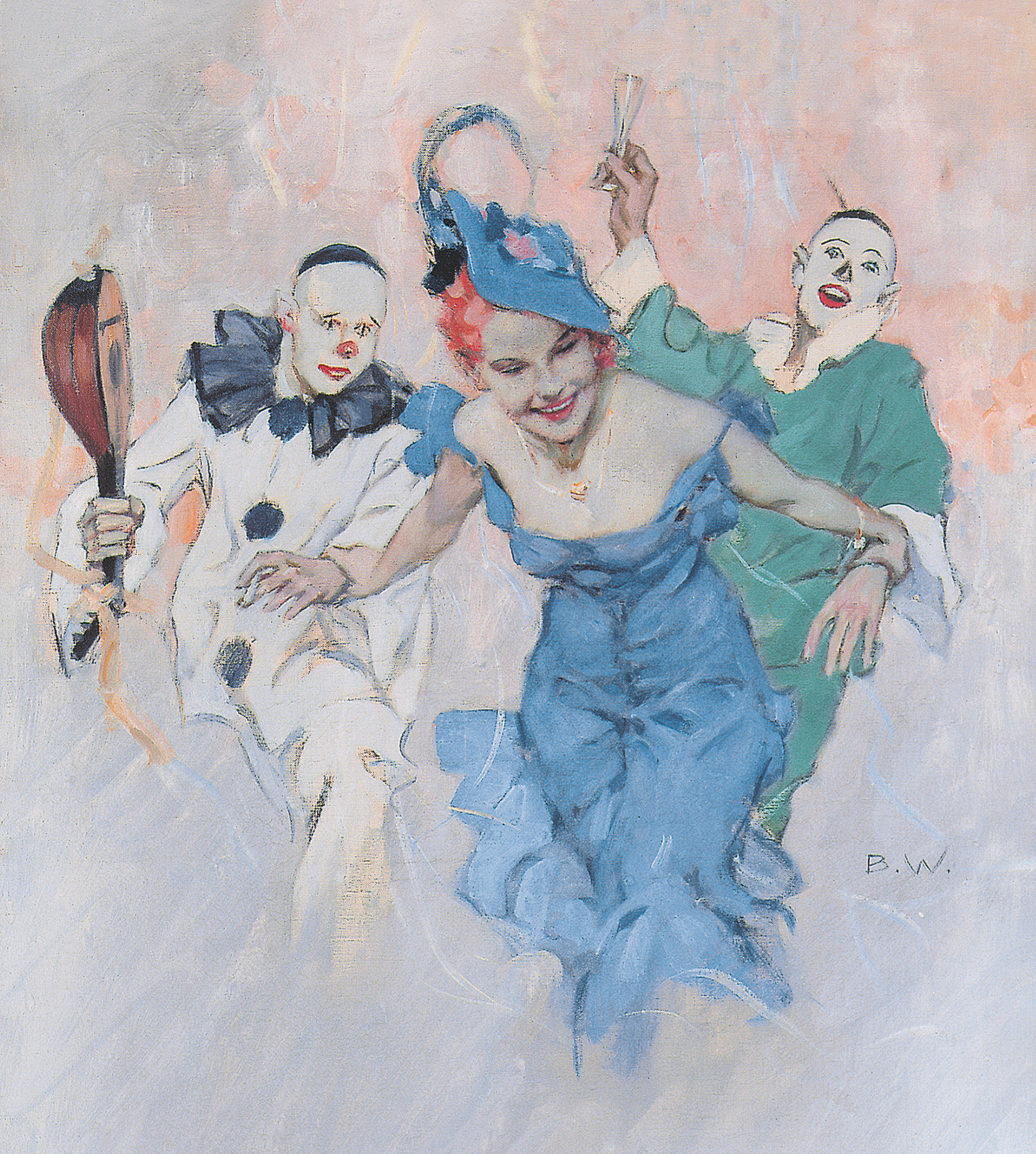
Fasching in Munich
(Columbina and Pierrot)

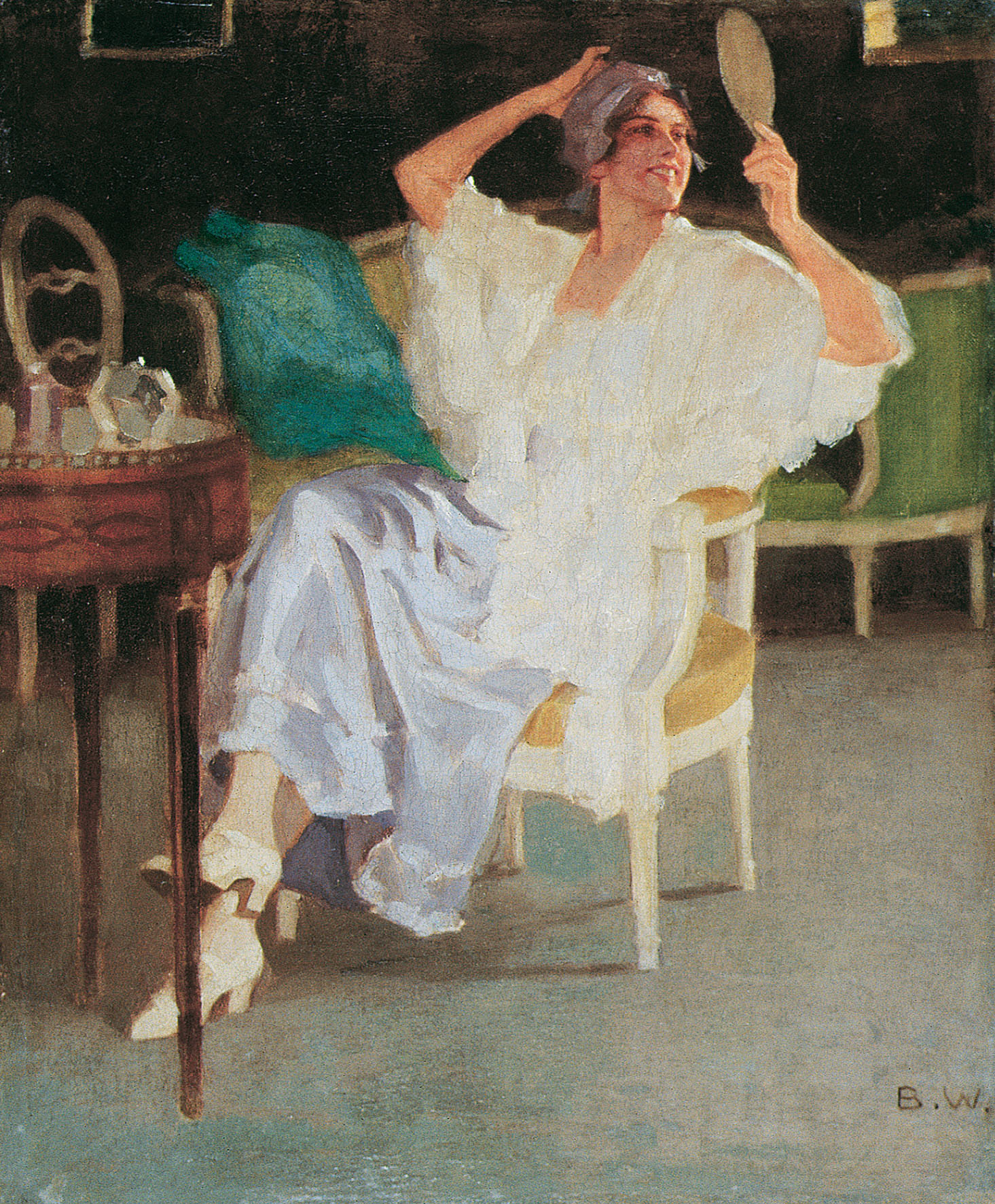
"Mirror, Mirror..."

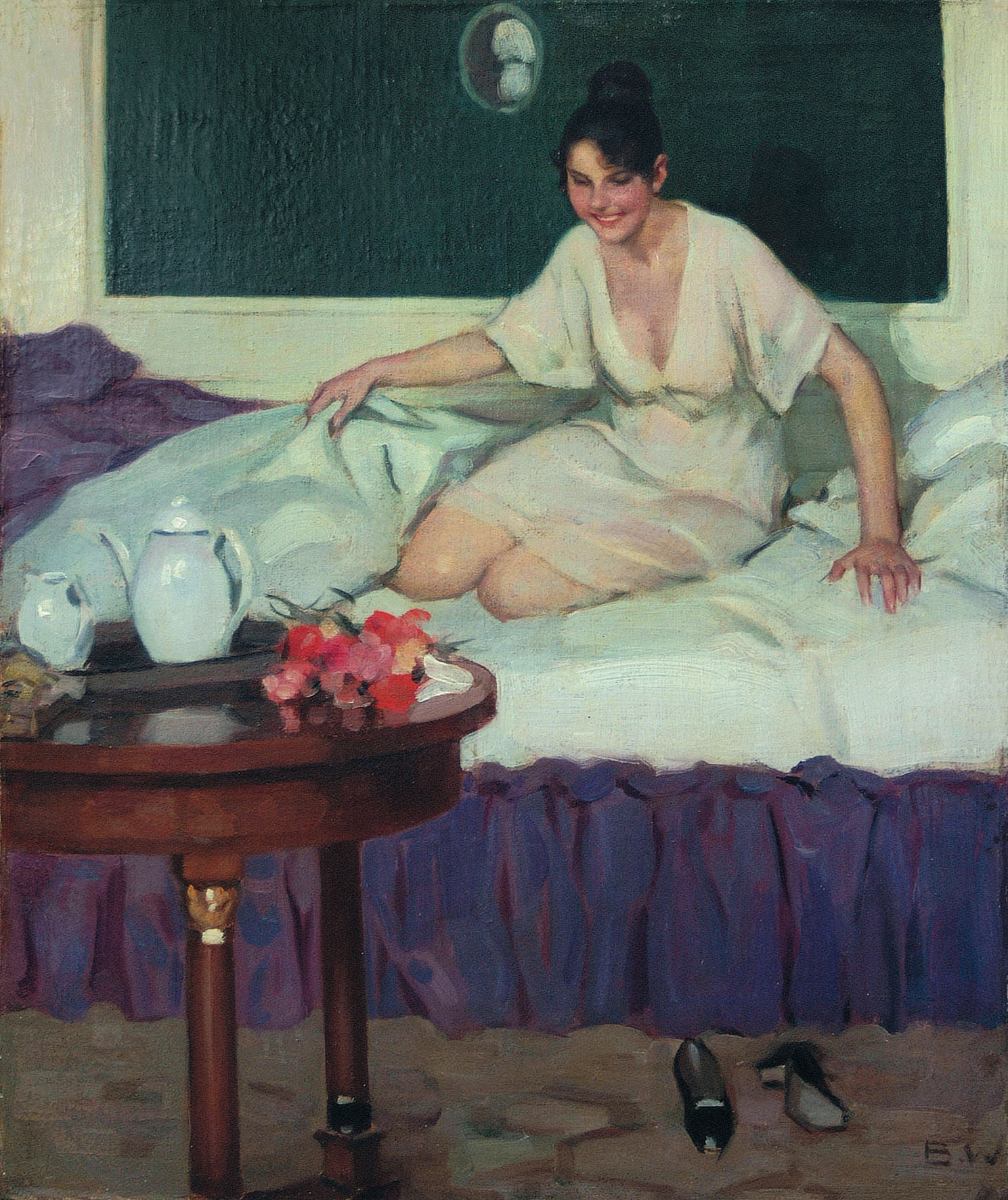
Wedding Dowry
