= Edvin Kallstenius =

Swedish composer and librarian

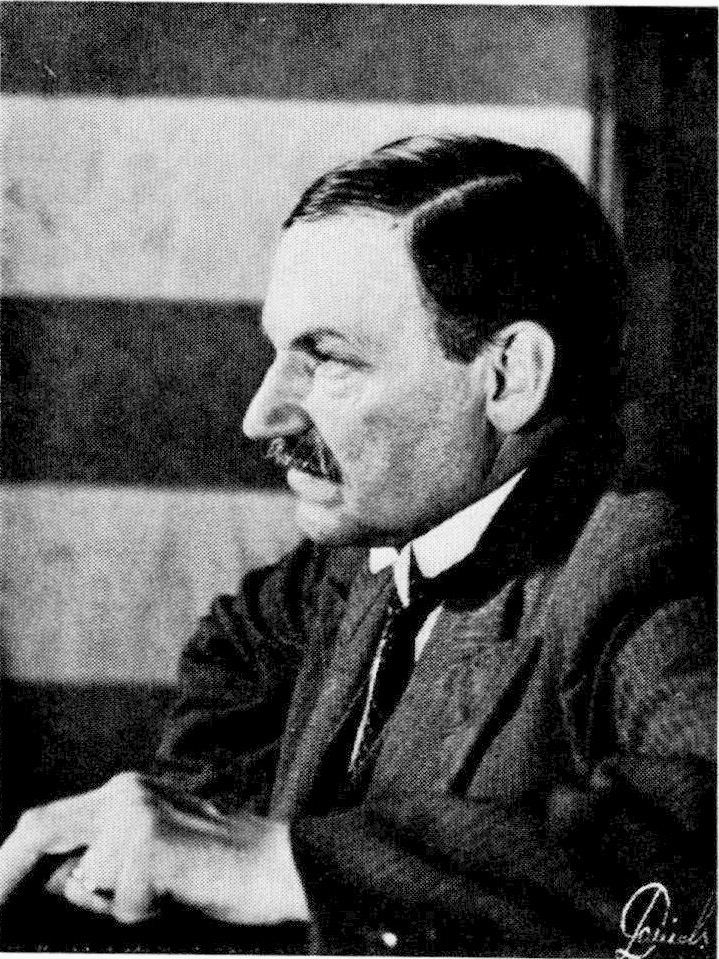
- Born: August 29, 1881; Filipstad, Sweden
- Died: November 22, 1967 (aged 86); Stockholm, Sweden
- Era: 20th Century

Edvin Kallstenius (29 August 1881 – 22 November 1967) was a Swedish composer and librarian. He arranged the traditional folk tune used as the de facto national anthem of Sweden, Du gamla, Du fria.

== Life and career ==
Born in Filipstad, Kallstenius studied natural sciences at Lund University from 1898–1903, then music at the Leipzig Conservatory under Stephan Krehl from 1904–1907. As music librarian at Sveriges Radio from 1928–1946, he made a significant contribution in the field of music administration in Sweden.

He also served on the Board of the Society of Swedish Composers from 1933–1961 (as treasurer 1933–1943), and was on the board of the Swedish Performing Rights Society from 1932–1957.

In addition to arranging Du gamla, Du fria, his work includes five symphonies and eight string quartets. He also published an annotated catalogue of Swedish orchestral works.

Kallstenius achieved an individual style and avoided using only tonal language by devising intense melodies reinforced with imaginative harmony. He declared that his "musical religion is called harmonics – everything else is secondary" and from this basis he worked out his "meticulously declamed themes". Although in later works he employed his own personal interpretation of serial style, he also composed charming versions of older Swedish music. He died in Stocksund, Stockholm.

== Selected compositions ==
- Op. 1 – String Quartet No. 1 (1904?)
- Op. 2 – String Quartet No. 2 (1905?)
- Op. 3 – 2 Songs: "Lykken mellem to Mennesker" and "Maanens Klage" (1907)
- Op. 4 – Scherzo fugato for orchestra (ca. 1906)
- Op. 4a – Fuga pastorale (Andante pastorale) for organ (1906)
- Op. 5 – Allegro sinfonico (Sista striden), tragic overture (1908; rev. 1933)
- Op. 6 – Cello Sonata in D major (1908)
- Op. 7 – Violin Sonata (1908)
- Op. 8 – String Quartet No. 3 (1914; rev. 1933)
- Op. 9 – 4 Songs: "Minnas", "Höbärgningen", "Luise Hensels Barnaftonbön" and "Välkommen åter, snälla sol" (1917; orch. 1946)
- Op. 10 – En serenad i sommarnatten, symphonic poem (1918)
- Op. 11 – När vi dö, a Swedish requiem for mixed choir and orchestra (1920; rev. 1963)
- Op. 12 – Piano Concerto, Sinfonia concertata (1922)
- Op. 13 – Sinfonietta No. 1 for orchestra (1923)
- Op. 14 – String Quartet No. 4, Divertimento alla Serenata (1924–1925)
- Op. 15 – 3 Songs: "Karin Månsdotters vaggvisa for Erik XIV", "Reisesegen" and "Gunhild" (ca. 1925)
- Op. 16 – Symphony No. 1 in E-flat major (1926)
- Op. 17 – Clarinet Quintet (1929–30)
- Op. 18 – Dalarapsodi for orchestra (1931)
- Op. 19 – Lustspelsuvertyr for orchestra (1934)
- Op. 20 – Symphony No. 2 in F minor (1935)
- Op. 21 – 3 Dansstudier for orchestra (1935)
- Op. 22 – Dalslandsrapsodi for orchestra (1936)
- Op. 23(a) – Suite for 14 winds and timpani (1938)
- Op. 23b – Suite for 9 instruments (1949)
- Op. 23c – Suite for 14-part orchestra (1949)
- Op. 24 – Romantico, overture for orchestra (1938)
- Op. 25 – Passacaglia and variations on a Rococo theme ("Old Man Noah") (ca. 1939)
- Op. 26 – Högtid och fest for orchestra (1940)
- Op. 27 – Musica gioconda, serenade for string orchestra (1941–1942)
- Op. 28 – Liten Falu-musik (1942)
- Op. 29(a) – Divertimento for wind quintet (1943; rev. 1960)
- Op. 29b – Divertimento da camera for orchestra (1943)
- Op. 30 – Cavatina for viola and orchestra (1943)
- Op. 31 – Passacaglia enarmonica (1943)
- Op. 32 – Sångoffer, solo cantata for baritone and orchestra (1944)
- Op. 33 – String Quartet No. 5 (1944–1945)
- Op. 34 – Sinfonietta No. 2 in G major (1946)
- Op. 35 – Variations on a theme of Kraus (1947)
- Op. 36 – Symphony No. 3 (ca. 1948)
- Op. 37 – Förändringar av en barnvisa for piano (1949)
- Op. 38 – Stjärntändningen for chamber choir and orchestra (1944)
- Op. 39 – Trio divertente for flute, violin and viola (1950)
- Op. 40 – Sonata concertante for cello and orchestra (1951–1952)
- Op. 41 – String Quartet No. 6 (1953; rev. 1955)
- Op. 42 – Musica sinfonica (1958-1959)
- Op. 43 – Symphony No. 4 (Sinfonia a fresco) (1953–1954)
- Op. 44 – Nytt vin i gamla läglar (1954)
- Op. 45 – Hymen, o, Hymenaios, ancient Greek wedding cantata for 3 soloists, mixed choir and orchestra (1955)
- Op. 46 – Sinfonietta dodicitonia (Sinfonietta No. 3) (1956)
- Op. 47a – Piccolo trio seriale for flute, English horn and clarinet (1956)
- Op. 47b – Piccolo trio seriale for violin, viola and clarinet (1957)
- Op. 48 – Choreographic suite for orchestra (1957)
- Op. 49 – String Quartet No. 7 (1957)
- Op. 50 – Sinfonietta semi-seriale (Sinfonietta No. 4) (1958)
- Op. 51 – Trio svagante for clarinet, horn and cello (1959)
- Op. 52 – Symphony No. 5, Sinfonia ordinaria ma su temi 12-tonici (1960)
- Op. 53 – Sonata for solo cello (1961)
- Op. 54 – String Quartet No. 8 (1961–1962)
- Op. 55 – Slätten och människan: Lyrisk svit for voice, flute, saxophone or clarinet and cello (1960–1962)
- Op. 56 – 3 songs for male choir: "Människors möte", "Fortvivlan" and "Forsvunnen rymd" (1962)
- Op. 57 – Sonata for solo flute (1962)
- Op. 58 – Äktenskap, suite of three duets for soprano, tenor, flute, clarinet and string trio: "Program", "Psalm for älskande" and "Äktenskap" (1962)
- Op. 59 – Två stycken i följd for cello and piano (1963)
- Op. 60 – Knoppningsbikt i kvinnodikt, for mixed choir and soprano soloist (1964)
- Op. 61 – String Trio (1965)
- Op. 62 – Sonata for solo violin (1965; rev. 1967)
- Op. 63 – Prologo seriale for orchestra (1966)
