= C. V. A. Strandberg =

Swedish poet and journalist (1818–1877)

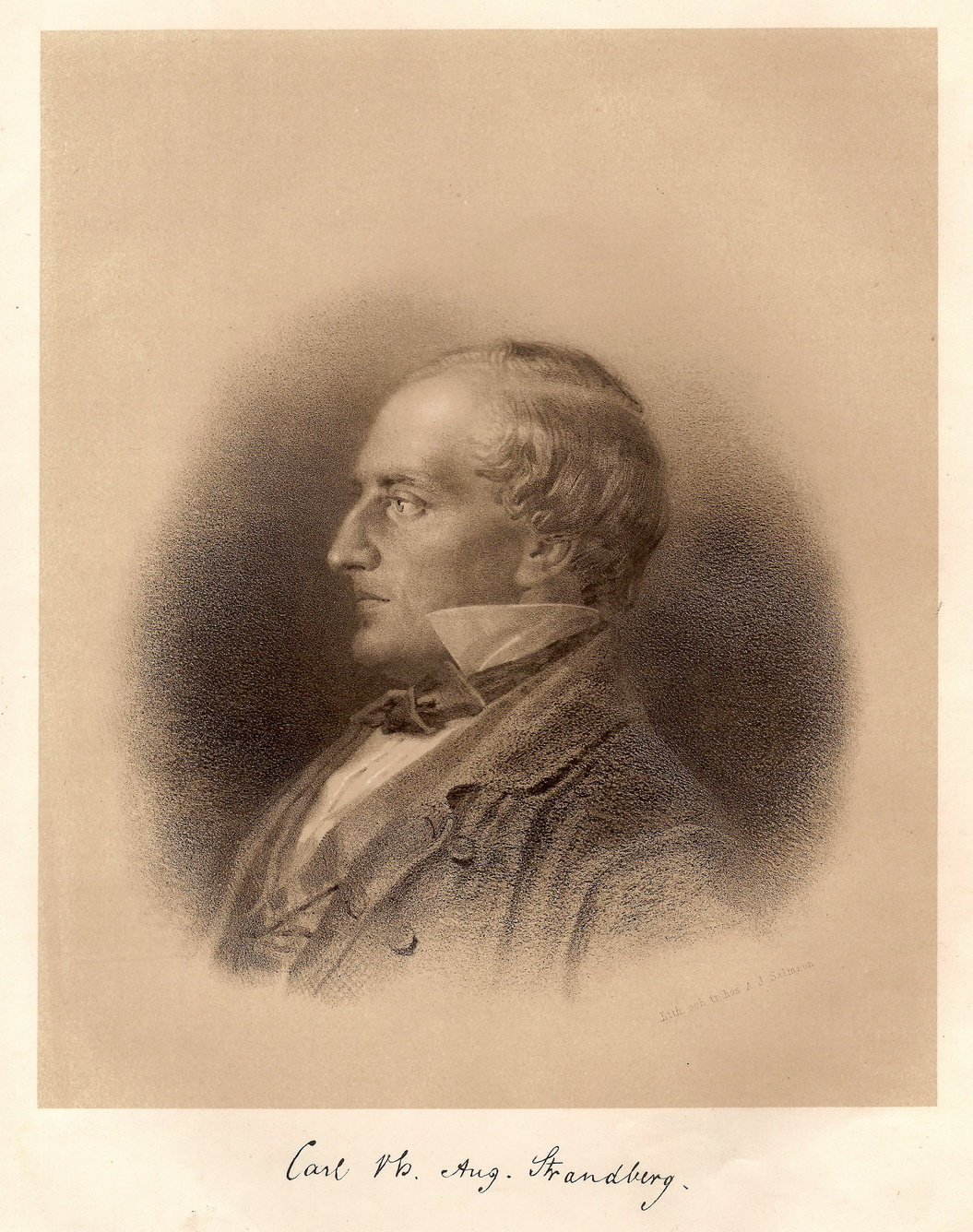
C.V.A. Strandberg

Carl Vilhelm August Strandberg (16 January 1818– 5 February 1877), also known by his pen name Talis Qualis, was a Swedish poet and journalist. He was member of the Swedish Academy from 1862.

C.V.A. Strandberg was born in Stigtomta into a clerical family. He was active as a student politician at Lund and proponent of Scandinavianism. Under his pen name he published collections of poetry such as Sånger i pansar (1845), Vilda rosor (1848) and Dikter (1854, 1861). In 1844 he wrote the lyrics for the Swedish royal anthem Kungssången (despite previously having identified as republican).

Strandberg also translated some foreign literature, the most notable being Don Juan by Lord Byron. As a journalist he wrote for Skånska Correspondenten in the 1840s and later became chief editor of Post- och Inrikes Tidningar.
