= Gunnar Brynolf Wennerberg =

Swedish painter

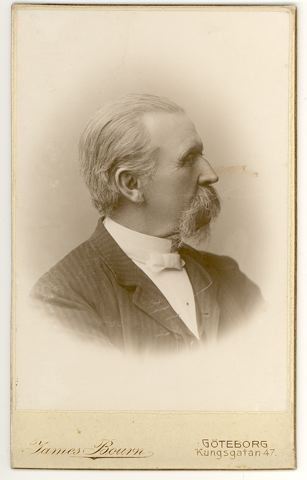
Gunnar Brynolf Wennerberg (1880)

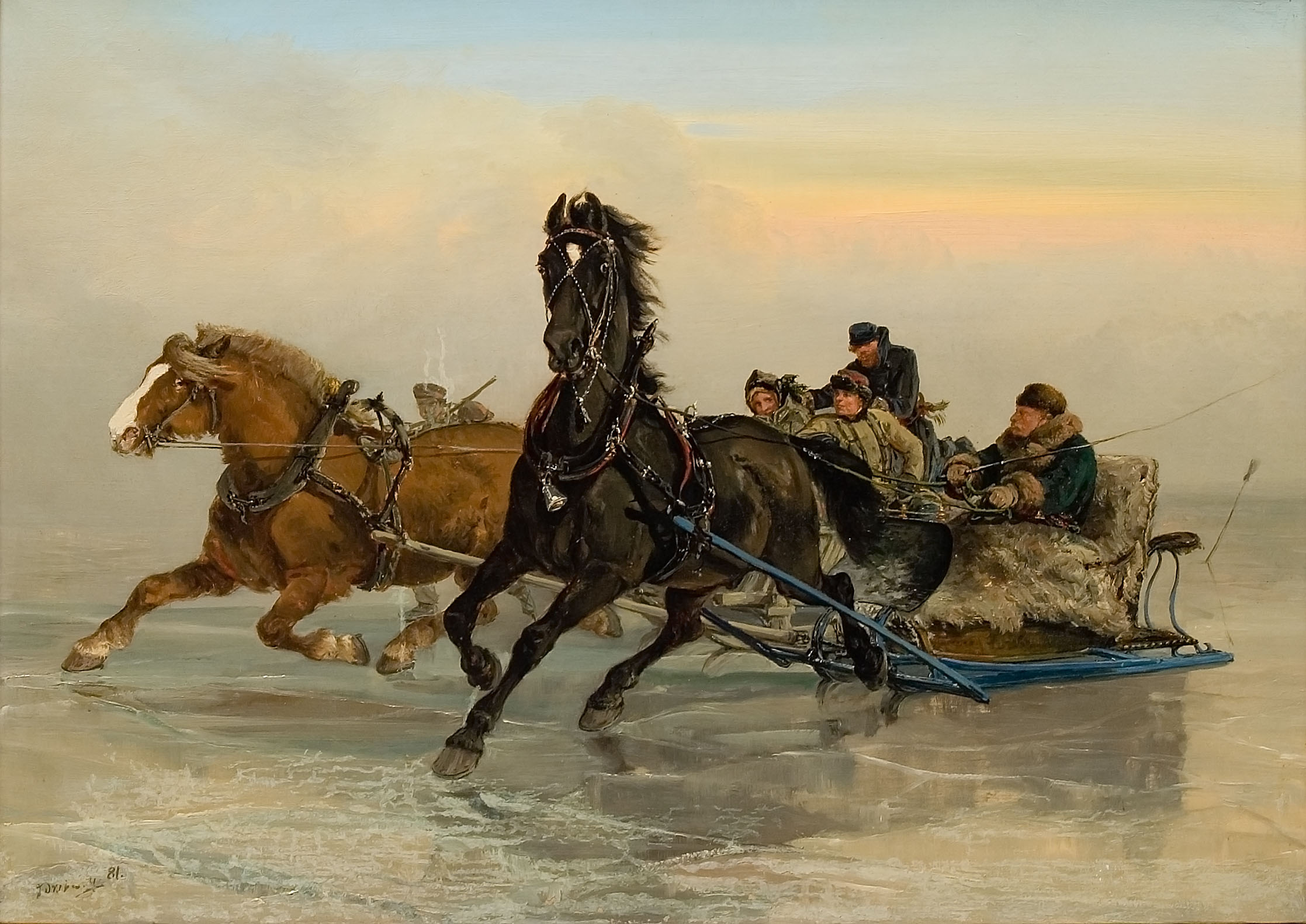
Journey on the Ice

Gunnar Brynolf Wennerberg (16 August 1823 in Lidköping – 3 October 1894 in Gothenburg) was a Swedish painter of the Düsseldorf School and a major landowner. He specialized in animal paintings (mostly horses) and genre scenes.

== Biography ==
His father, Gunnar Wennerberg den äldre (1782-1860), was a rural dean in Lidköping. His brother was the poet and composer, Gunnar Wennerberg.

He developed an early interest in music and painting, but eventually decided to focus on the latter. His first studies were with Uno Troili in Stockholm. In 1850, he continued his studies in Copenhagen. When his brother was awarded a royal scholarship, he went to Germany with him as a study companion. Their first stop was Leipzig, where they attended concerts and visited museums. In Düsseldorf, he registered as a student at the Kunstakademie Düsseldorf, while his brother continued on to Italy. He was one of only two Swedish students at the academy; the other being Carl d'Unker. He stayed there for three years, during which time his primary instructors were Karl Ferdinand Sohn and Rudolf Wiegmann.

After his studies, he returned home and became involved in his father's church. He and some friends published an album called "Bilder ur Svenska Folklifvet" (Pictures from Swedish Folklife), which had some mild success. He was home for only short time when the money earned from painting portraits of a local nobleman and his family enabled him to make another trip overseas. In 1857, he went to Paris, rented a studio and took lessons from Thomas Couture. In 1860, he once again returned to Lidköping to marry Georgina Charlotta Schoug (1830-1870), the daughter of Johann Peter Schoug (1802-1890), a wealthy merchant from Germany. In 1870, Charlotta died of pneumonia. Two years later, he married her younger sister, Eugenia Louise (1845-1915).

He built an estate near Lidköping, Krongodset Djurgården, where he farmed and bred horses. It became an important meeting point for local artists, including Frederik Collett and Arvid Mauritz Lindström. Emma Meissner, the soprano, and her brother, Hjalmar, the conductor, were also frequent guests.

Between 1860 and 1890, he participated in several exhibitions at the Royal Swedish Academy of Fine Arts, but his works (mostly pictures of horses) received little serious attention. In 1889, a fire broke out at his estate and the main building was destroyed. Some paintings were rescued and sent to the local Vänermuseet, but they made no attempt to rebuild and moved to Göteborg. His younger children were sent to boarding schools and, until his death, he spent the summers at one of the surviving buildings on his estate.

His son by his first marriage, Brynolf Wennerberg, also became an artist and his daughter from his second marriage, Sara Wennerberg-Reuter, was a well known organist and composer.
