= Du gamla, du fria =

National anthem of Sweden

English: 'You ancient, you free'
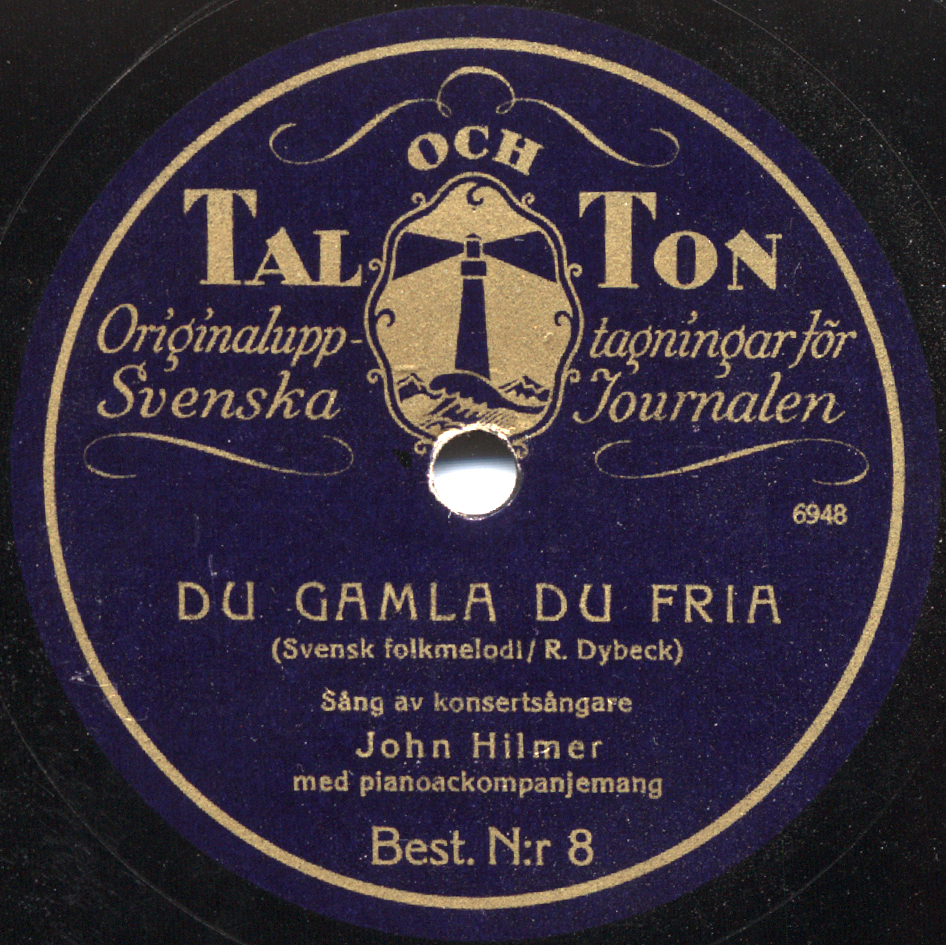
- A shellac record of "Du gamla, du fria" published by Tal och ton, dated 1930
- National anthem of Sweden
- Also known as: Sång till Norden (English: 'Song to the Nordics')
- Lyrics: Richard Dybeck, 1844
- Music: Based on a Swedish folk tune (arranged for orchestra by Edvin Kallstenius, 1933)

Audio sample
- U.S. Navy Band instrumental version (two verses) in A-flat major: file; help

Du gamla, du fria (Note: Swedish pronunciation: [dʉː ˈɡâmːla dʉː ˈfrîːa]) (lit. 'You ancient, you free'), is the de facto national anthem of Sweden. Originally titled Sång till Norden (Note: pronounced [ˈsɔŋː tɪl ˈnǔːɖɛn]) (lit. 'Song to the Nordics'), its lyrics were written in 1844 by Swedish antiquarian Richard Dybeck, who set them to a variation of the old folk melody Kärestans död (lit. 'Death of a loved one').

The song has been widely recognised as the national anthem since the late 19th century, gaining prominence after King Oscar II, attending a dinner in 1893, stood in acknowledgement upon hearing the song. It gained further recognition in 1938, when Sveriges Radio, the national public broadcaster, began playing it at the conclusion of its daily programming. In 2000, the Riksdag (Swedish Parliament) declined a proposal to officially recognise Du gamla, du fria as the national anthem, stating that its established status through tradition rendered formal adoption unnecessary.

Dybeck's original lyrics consist of two verses, reflecting the ideals of Scandinavianism. It references the Nordic region (Swedish: Norden) but not Sweden itself, making the Polish national anthem the only national anthem to reference Sweden. Various attempts have been made to introduce additional verses that explicitly mention Sweden, but none have been popularly adopted.

In addition to the national anthem, Sweden has a royal anthem, Kungssången (lit. 'The King's Song').

== History ==
The original lyrics were written by Richard Dybeck in 1844, to the melody of a variant of the ballad "Kärestans död" (lit. 'Death of a loved one'). The ballad type is classified as D 280 in The Types of the Scandinavian Medieval Ballad; the variant from Västmanland that Dybeck reproduced is classified as SMB 133 G. It was recorded by Rosa Wretman at the beginning of the 1840s. Dybeck published the traditional text in Folk-lore I, and the melody in 1845 in his Runa, where he also published his new text "Sång till Norden" (Song for/to the North).

Dybeck himself originally wrote the beginning as "Du gamla, du friska" (lit. 'You ancient, you healthy'), but in the late 1850s, he changed the lyrics to "Du gamla, du fria". The song was already published in several song books and sung with "Du gamla, du friska", but a priest who had known Dybeck took the opportunity to inform the singer most associated with the song, opera singer Carl Fredrik Lundqvist, about the change in the year 1900. From that point on, printings of the "friska" version ceased to be seen in song books, but a recording from 1905 where it is sung with "friska" still exists. The Swedish composer Edvin Kallstenius made an orchestral arrangement of the song in 1933.

By the early 20th century, many regarded the song unsuitable as a national anthem. From the 1890s, it was included in the "patriotic songs" section of song books, but up to the 1920s it was occasionally published just as "folk music". In 1899, a contest to produce a national anthem was held. It led to Verner von Heidenstam writing "Sverige", but did not lead to a new national anthem.

Patriotic sentiment is notably absent from the text of the original two verses, due to their being written in the spirit of Scandinavism popular at the time. (Note: Norden in general refers to the Nordic countries in Swedish, Norwegian, and Danish) After the song started to acquire its informal status as the national anthem, various people wrote additional verses to increase the "Swedish-ness" of the song. The aforementioned Lundqvist wrote his own third verse beginning with "Jag älskar dig Sverige" (lit. 'Thee I Adore, Sweden'); Frans Österblom wrote four verses beginning with "Jag älskar min hembygd" (lit. 'I Adore My Homestead'); and Louise Ahlén with two verses. However, these are not accepted as part of the anthem, and are not normally published or sung.

== Status ==
Similarly to the national anthems of Finland and the United Kingdom, Du gamla, du fria is not defined in Sweden's constitutional Basic Laws, nor has it been formally recognised by other legislation, unlike Sweden's flag and coat of arms. Despite this, the song enjoys universal recognition, and is used at official events such as state visits and the Opening of the Riksdag, at sporting events, and at the Nobel Prize Award Ceremony.

The song gained status as the national anthem from the late 19th century, becoming predominant in 1893 after King Oscar II stood up in acknowledgement of the song at a dinner at Lund University. In 1938, Sveriges Radio, the national public radio broadcasting service, began playing it at the conclusion of its daily programming, gaining it further recognition. By the end of the 1930s, the song's status had effectively been established.

The song's status has been the subject of multiple motions in the Riksdag. In 1986, a motion proposed granting the song legal recognition, but it was not passed. Further motions from MPs of various political parties in 2000, 2007, 2019 and 2024 have also sought official status for the anthem. However, none of these proposals have ever been accepted by the Riksdag.

In 2000, a Riksdag committee concluded that, as Du gamla, du fria had already become de facto the national anthem, formal recognition was unnecessary. The committee argued that no official confirmation was required, as the anthem's status was already entrenched in Swedish society.

== Lyrics ==
=== Swedish ===
1938 orchestral and vocal recording (verses one and two)
Performed by John Hilmer Borgeling (1903–1969).

==== Modern version ====
Du gamla, du fria contains two verses, both of which are sung.

Du gamla, du fria
Swedish original

Du gamla, Du fria, Du fjällhöga nord
Du tysta, Du glädjerika sköna!
Jag hälsar Dig, vänaste land uppå jord,
𝄆 Din sol, Din himmel, Dina ängder gröna. 𝄇

Du tronar på minnen från fornstora da'r,
då ärat Ditt namn flög över jorden.
Jag vet att Du är och Du blir vad Du var. (Note: Often sung as Jag vet att Du är och förblir vad Du var [jɑː(ɡ) věːt atː dʉː æːr ɔ(kː) fœr.ˈbliːr vɑː(d) dʉː vɑːr].)
𝄆 Ja, jag vill leva, jag vill dö i Norden. 𝄇

IPA transcription (Note: See Help:IPA/Swedish and Swedish phonology.)

[dʉː ˈɡâmː.la dʉː ˈfrîː.a dʉː ˈfjɛ̂lː.ˌhøː.ɡa nǔːɖ |]
[dʉː ˈtʏ̂sː.ta dʉː ˈɡlɛ̂ːd.jɛ̠.ˌriː.ka ˈɧø̂ː.na ‖]
[jɑː(ɡ) ˈhɛ̂lː.sa‿ɖɛj ˈvɛ̂ː.nas.tɛ̠ lanːd ˈɵ̌p.poː juːɖ |]
𝄆 [dɪnː suːl dɪnː ˈhɪ̂m.mɛ̠l ˈdîː.na ˈɛ̂ŋː.dɛ̠r ˈɡrø̂ː.na ‖] 𝄇

[dʉː ˈtrûː.nar poː ˈmɪ̂n.nɛ̠n froːn ˈfûːɳ.ˌʂtuː.ra dɑːr |]
[dǒː ˈæ̂ː.rat dɪtː namːn fløːɡ ˈøː.vɛ̠r ˈjǔː.ɖɛ̠n ‖]
[jɑː(ɡ) věːt atː dʉː æːr ɔ(kː) dʉː bliːr vɑː(d) dʉː vɑːr |]
𝄆 [jɑː jɑː(ɡ) vɪlː ˈlêː.va jɑː(ɡ) vɪlː døː iː ˈnǔː.ɖɛ̠n ‖] 𝄇

English translation

You old, you free, you high mountain North
You silent, you joyful beauty!
I greet you, friendliest land upon Earth,
𝄆 Your sun, your sky, your countryside (Note: The word ängd is nowadays often interpreted as synonymous with 'äng' (meadow).) green. 𝄇

You sit enthroned upon memories of ancient days,
When your name flew over the Earth in glory,
I know that you are, and you will be what you were,
𝄆 Yes, I want to live, I want to die in the North. 𝄇

==== Original lyrics ====
Richard Dybeck originally wrote these lyrics, but revised them in the late 1850s to the version used today. The lyrics presented here also follow archaic spelling conventions that were in use before the 1906 Swedish spelling reform.

Du gamla, du friska
Swedish original

Du gamla, du friska, du fjellhöga Nord,
Du tysta, du glädjerika sköna!
Jag helsar dig, vänsta land uppå jord,
𝄆 Din sol, din himmel, dina ängder gröna. 𝄇

Du tronar på minnen från fornstora da'r,
Då äradt ditt namn flög öfver jorden;
Jag vet att du är och blir hvad du var,
𝄆 Ack, jag vill lefva, jag vill dö i Norden! 𝄇

English translation

You old, you healthy, you high mountain North
You quiet, you joyous beauty!
I greet you, loveliest land upon Earth,
𝄆 Your sun, your sky, your countryside green. 𝄇

You are enthroned upon memories of ancient days,
When honoured your name flew across Earth,
I know that you are, and you will be, what you were,
𝄆 Oh! I want to live, I want to die in the North. 𝄇

=== National minority languages ===
Du gamla, du fria is sung in Swedish in official contexts, however translations of the lyrics into some of Sweden's national minority languages exist.

==== Finnish ====
Pohjolanmaa (lit. 'Nordic land') is the de facto Finnish version of the song. Originally translated by Finnish writer Alpo Noponen (1862–1927), it has been used in textbooks produced by the Swedish National Agency for Education. Finnish is an official national minority language in Sweden.

Pohjolanmaa
Finnish version

Sä jylhä ja ponteva pohjolanmaa,
sä hiljainen riemun kehto parhain,
sä armahin seutu, min kohdata saa,
𝄆 maa kukkanurmein, koskein, tähtitarhain. 𝄇

Sun muistosi suuret, sun uljahat työs
ei hukkua saata ajanvuolla;
mit’ ennen voit olla, voit vastakin myös –
𝄆 mä pohjolassa tahdon elää, kuolla. 𝄇

English translation

You majestic and vigorous North,
you quiet cradle of joy, the best of them all,
you most beloved country, that one can ever meet.
𝄆 Land of flower fields, brooks, starry heavens. 𝄇

Your great memories, your grand works,
may not drown in the passage of time;
what you once were, you can be once more –
𝄆 In the North I want to live, to die. 𝄇

==== Southern Sámi ====
In 1938, Sveriges Radio recorded a Southern Sámi version of Du gamla, du fria, performed by students from Skarvsjöby nomad school in Västerbotten. The lyrics were taken from the 1911 songbook Sami laulotasah – Liten lappsk och svensk sångbok (lit. 'Little Lapp and Swedish songbook'), though the author is unknown. The Sámi languages have official national minority language status in Sweden.

Southern Sámi version

Tån aiteki lanta tu all vari kum,
tån tjappa tån avost tievas ätnam.
Mån ätsav tu fapmokis ruodnis mietsi kum
𝄆 tu almev, tu jaurit, tu änoit. 𝄇

Tu namma li allak tu fapmo vil aj,
tu kudne kitt alme radjai kulloi.
Mån tietav att nåu tat kalka sjaddat aj.
𝄆 Mån sitav viessot, japmet ietjat lunne. 𝄇

== See also ==
- Flag of Sweden
- National Day of Sweden
- Public holidays in Sweden

== Sources ==
- Reinhammar, Maj (2013). "Swedish Dialects and Folk Traditions 2013" (PDF). Swedish Dialects and Folk Traditions (339). Royal Gustavus Adolphus Academy. ISSN 0347-1837. Archived (PDF) from the original on 2022-10-09.
