= Abraham Niclas Edelcrantz =

Swedish inventor

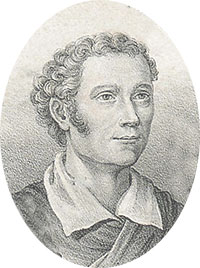
Abraham Niclas Edelcrantz

Abraham Niclas Edelcrantz (born Clewberg; 28 July 1754 – 15 March 1821) was a Finnish-born Swedish poet and inventor. He was a member of the Swedish Academy, chair 2, from 1786 to 1821.

Edelcrantz was the librarian at The Royal Academy of Turku. In 1783 he moved to Stockholm to lead the Royal Theater and later work as the private secretary of the king Gustaf III. He is known for his experiment with the optical telegraph. He inaugurated his telegraph with a poem dedicated to the Swedish King on his birthday in 1794. The message went from the Palace in Stockholm to the King at Drottningholm.

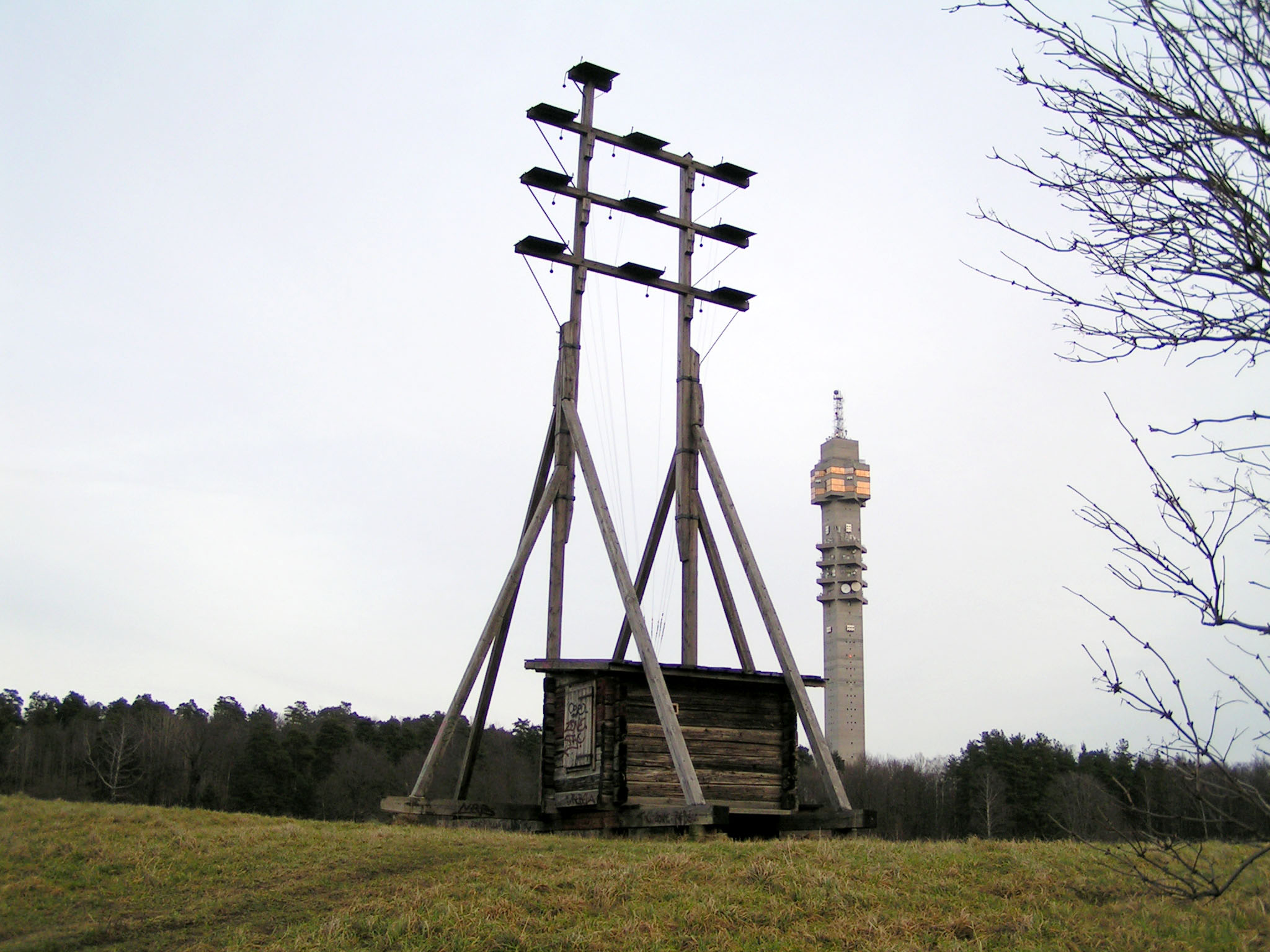
A replica of Edelcrantz's optical telegraph in Stockholm

He eventually developed his own system which was quite different from its French counterpart and almost twice as fast. His system was based on ten collapsible iron shutters. The several positions of the shutters formed combinations of numbers which were translated into letters, words or phrases via codebooks. The telegraph network was made up of telegraph stations positioned at about 10 kilometres from one another.

In 1796 he wrote A Treatise on Telegraphs.

In 1797, he was elected a member of the Royal Swedish Academy of Sciences.

== See also ==
- Bevare gud vår kung

Cultural offices
Preceded by Carl Fredrik Scheffer	Swedish Academy, Chair No 2; 1786-1821	Succeeded by Carl Peter Hagberg
