= Carl August Hagberg =

Swedish linguist and translator (1810–1864)

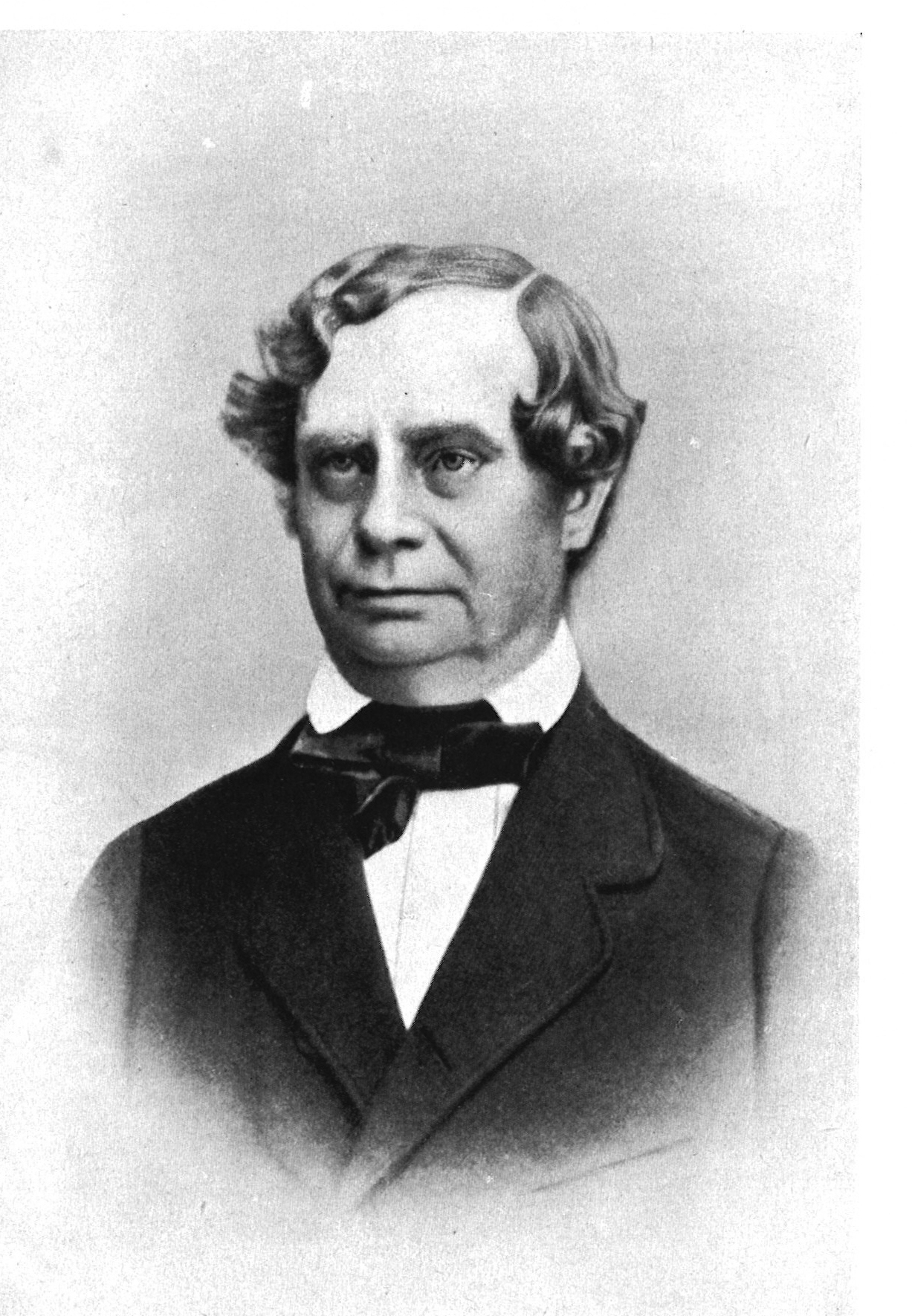
- Carl August Hagberg.
- Born: 7 July 1810
- Died: 9 January 1864 (aged 53)
- Occupation(s): Swedish linguist and translator

Carl August Hagberg (7 July 1810 – 9 January 1864) was a Swedish linguist and translator. He was a member of the Swedish Academy, occupying a seat from 1851 until his death. He was the son of Carl Peter Hagberg.

Hagberg is most famous for being the first person to produce a Swedish translation of the Complete Works of Shakespeare; the twelve volumes of his translation was issued between 1847 and 1851. Several of his translations were, however, based on the work of Johan Henrik Thomander, who had produced a collected edition of Antony and Cleopatra, As You Like It, The Merry Wives of Windsor, Richard II and Twelfth Night in 1825.

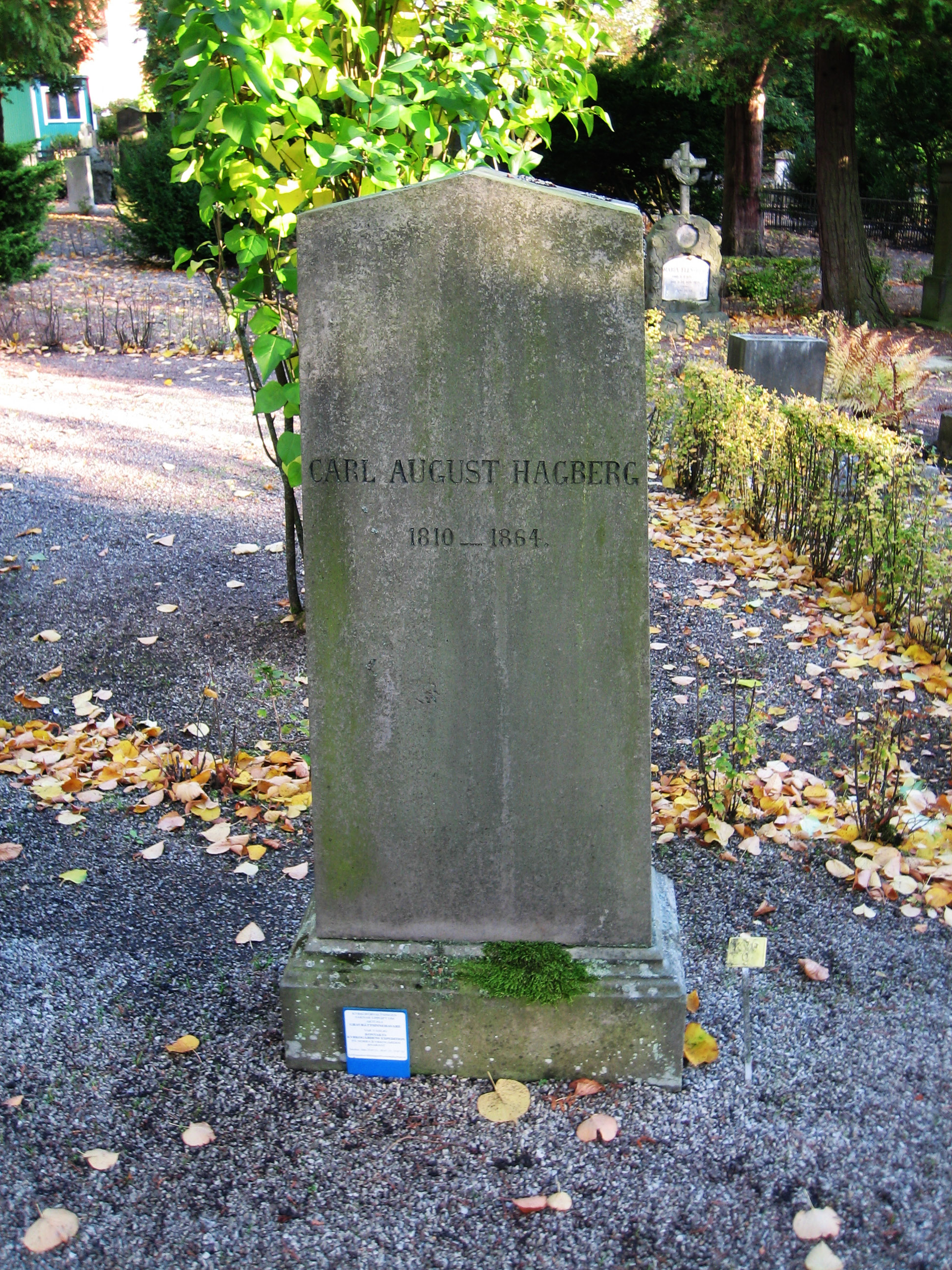
Grave of Carl August Hagberg in Lund.

Hagberg was a student at Uppsala University, and became a professor of Ancient Greek there in 1833. Upon his father's advice, he spent 1835 and 1836 travelling in Germany and France. During this time he met notable writers from both countries, including: Victor Hugo, Friedrich Wilhelm Joseph Schelling and Ludwig Tieck. Upon his return to Sweden, Hagberg became a strong advocate of English and French literature – at the time Swedish universities were dominated by German influences. In 1837 he wrote Om den nya franska vitterheten, an essay surveying contemporary French literature.

Hagberg was a professor of aesthetics and modern languages at Lund University from 1840 to 1859, when he became a professor of Nordic languages at the same university. He was one of the most famous public speakers of his day. In 1853 he was asked to make the public address at the unveiling of the statue of Esaias Tegnér at Lund Cathedral. From 1862 to 1863 he was the inspektor of Småland Nation, Lund. He was succeeded by Theodor Wisén as the chair of Scandinavian languages at Lund University.

Cultural offices
Preceded by Anders Carlsson af Kullberg	Swedish Academy, Seat No 7; 1851 – 1864	Succeeded by Wilhelm Erik Svedelius
