= Otto Lindblad =

Swedish composer (1809–1864)

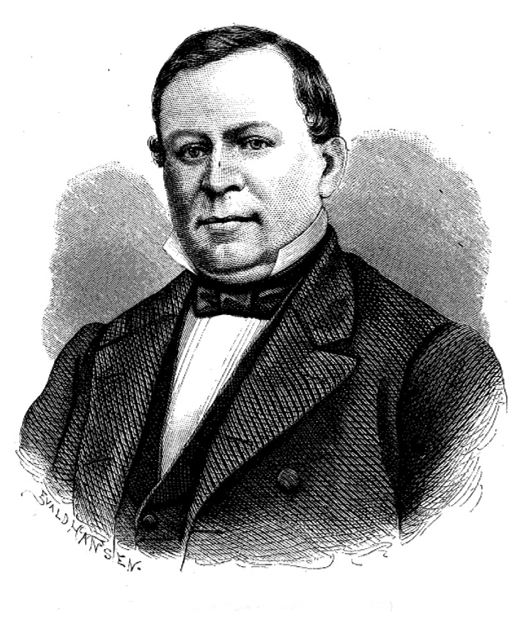
Otto Lindblad

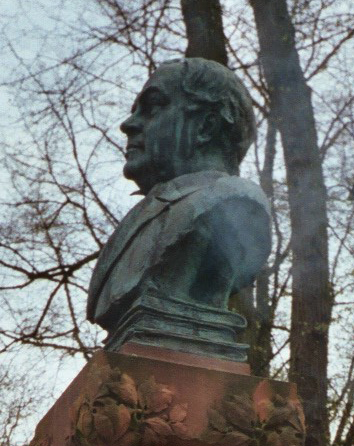
Bust in honour of Otto Lindblad

Otto Jonas Lindblad (31 March 1809 – 26 January 1864), was a Swedish composer. He is most famous for the musical score of Kungssången, the Swedish royal anthem.

Otto Lindblad was the son of a clergyman. He was born in Karlstorp and attended gymnasium in Växjö. In 1829 he began academic studies at the University of Lund where he was a pupil of Mathias Lundholm. In Lund, he formed a group with A. E. Christernin and J. Meurling, together with whom he played and sang a type of three part music pieces. The group became known as the "musical trefoil band". In 1836 he ended his studies and fully devoted his time to music. Two years later he formed the Lund Student Singers Association. On 5 December 1844 he presented the Royal Anthem for the first time, at a celebration for King Oscar I.

In 1846 Lindblad undertook a national tour with the noted Lund Quartet. The tour's revenue was to have been used for student housing in Lund, but the profit was too small and they only managed to bring home 1500 Riksdaler. In the spring of 1847 he took up the position of parish clerk and organist in Mellby. He married Emma Andersson in 1855. Their only child, a daughter, died as an infant. Otto Lindblad died in North Mellby parish at the age of 55 years, following a long period of illness.

== Compositions ==
- "Trollhättan"
- "Längtan till landet" (better known as "Vintern rasat ut...")
- "Liten fågel"
- "Minnets temple"
- "Sångfåglarne"
- "Till konung Oscar I"
- "Ur Shakespeares Henrik III"
- "Ångbåtssång"
- "Kungssången" - The Royal Anthem
