= Sara Wennerberg-Reuter =

Swedish organist and composer

Sara Wennerberg-Reuter (11 February 1875 – 29 March 1959) was a Swedish organist and composer. She was the niece of the composer Gunnar Wennerberg (1817-1901). Her father, Gunnar Brynolf Wennerberg, was an artist.

Sara Wennerberg-Reuter received her early musical training in organ and harmony in Gothenburg and studied at the Stockholm Conservatory (1893-1895), graduating as an organist. She then studied in Leipzig (1896-1898) with Salomon Jadassohn and Carl Reinecke and continued her composition and counterpoint studies (1901-1902) with Max Bruch in Berlin. She was organist at the Sofia Church in Stockholm, from 1906 to 1945.

Sara Wennerberg-Reuter’s compositions, and especially her male voice quartets, were performed frequently in their day. Her Easter Hymn, motets and anthems for mixed choir were also part of the standard repertoire, as were her Violin Sonata (1904) and some of her piano pieces.

She wrote a consecration cantata for the Sofia Church in 1906, and another cantata for the church in 1941. She also wrote several other cantatas as well as two tone poems for solo voices, choir and orchestra, one called Necken (to a poem by her uncle Gunnar Wennerberg) and the other titled Skogsrået (to a text by Viktor Rydberg) in 1915, were well received.
