= Gunnar Wennerberg =

Swedish poet, composer and politician (1817–1901)

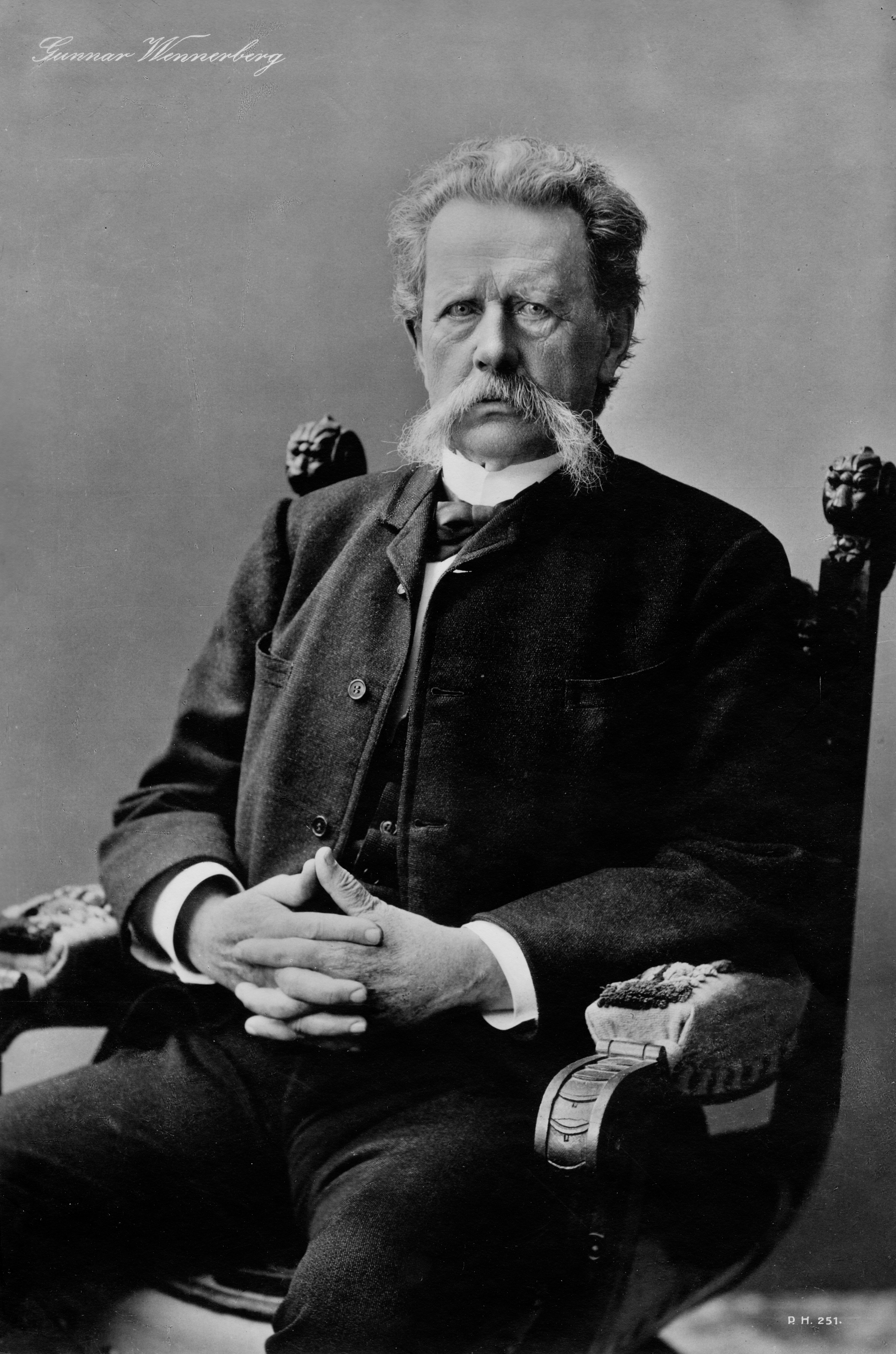
Gunnar Wennerberg in his final years, ca 1897–1901.

Gunnar Wennerberg (2 October 1817 – 24 August 1901) was a Swedish poet, composer and politician.

== Biography ==
Wennerberg was the son of the vicar of the town of Lidköping in Västergötland, went to gymnasium in the cathedral town of Skara, and matriculated as a student at Uppsala University in 1837, where he studied natural sciences, Classical philology, Philosophy and Aesthetics. He received his filosofie magister degree in 1845 and became a docent of Aesthetics in 1846.

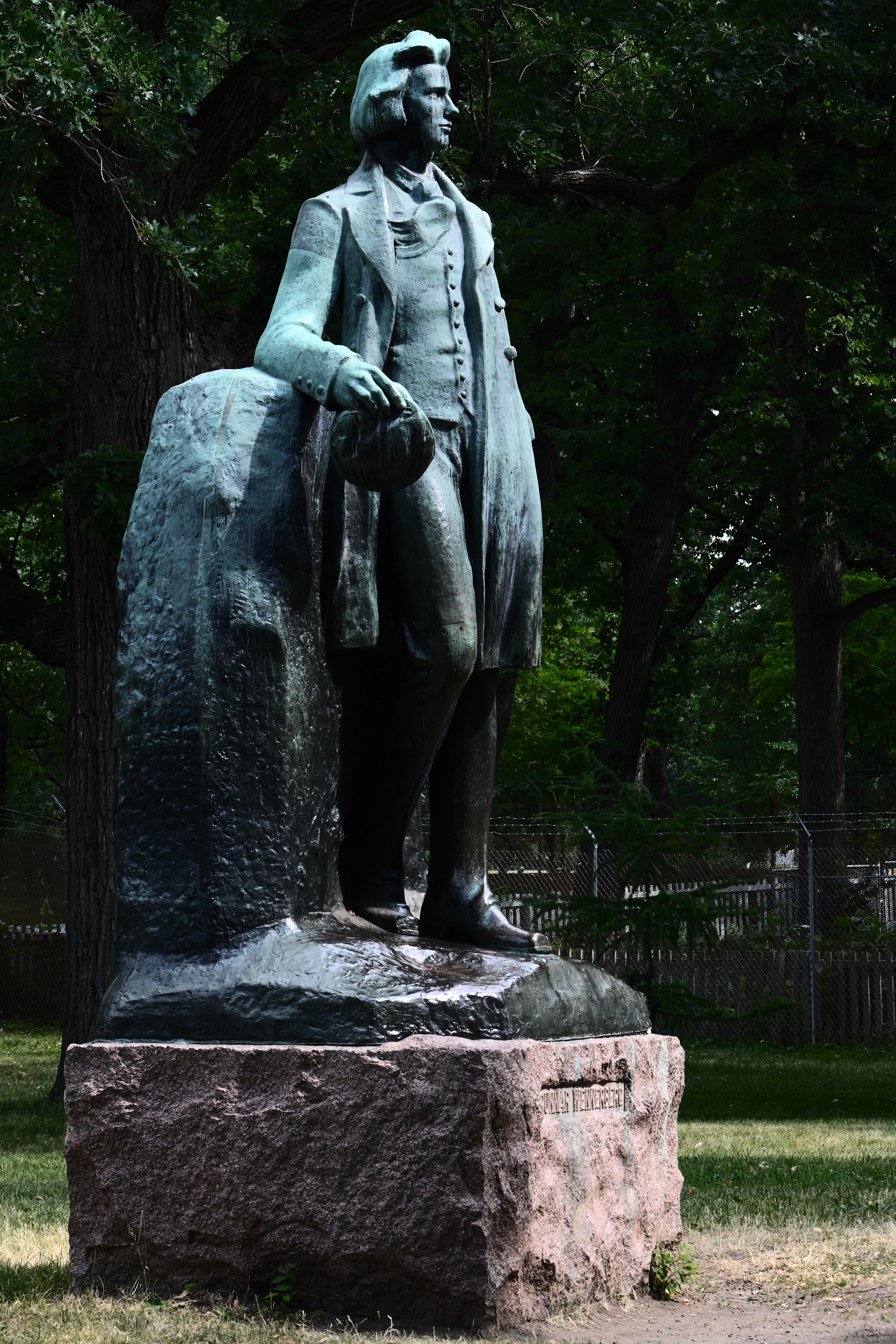
Statue by Carl Johan Eldh in Minnehaha Park

From the outset of his career he was accepted in the inner circle of men of light and leading for which the university was at that time famous. In 1843, he became a member of the musical club that called themselves The Juvenals, and for their meetings were written the trios and duets, music and words, which Wennerberg began to publish in 1846. In the following year appeared the earliest numbers of Gluntarne (or "The Boys"), thirty duets for baritone and bass, which continued to be issued from 1847 to 1850. The success of these remarkable productions, masterpieces in two arts, was overwhelming: they presented an epitome of all that was most unusual and most attractive in the curious university life of Sweden.

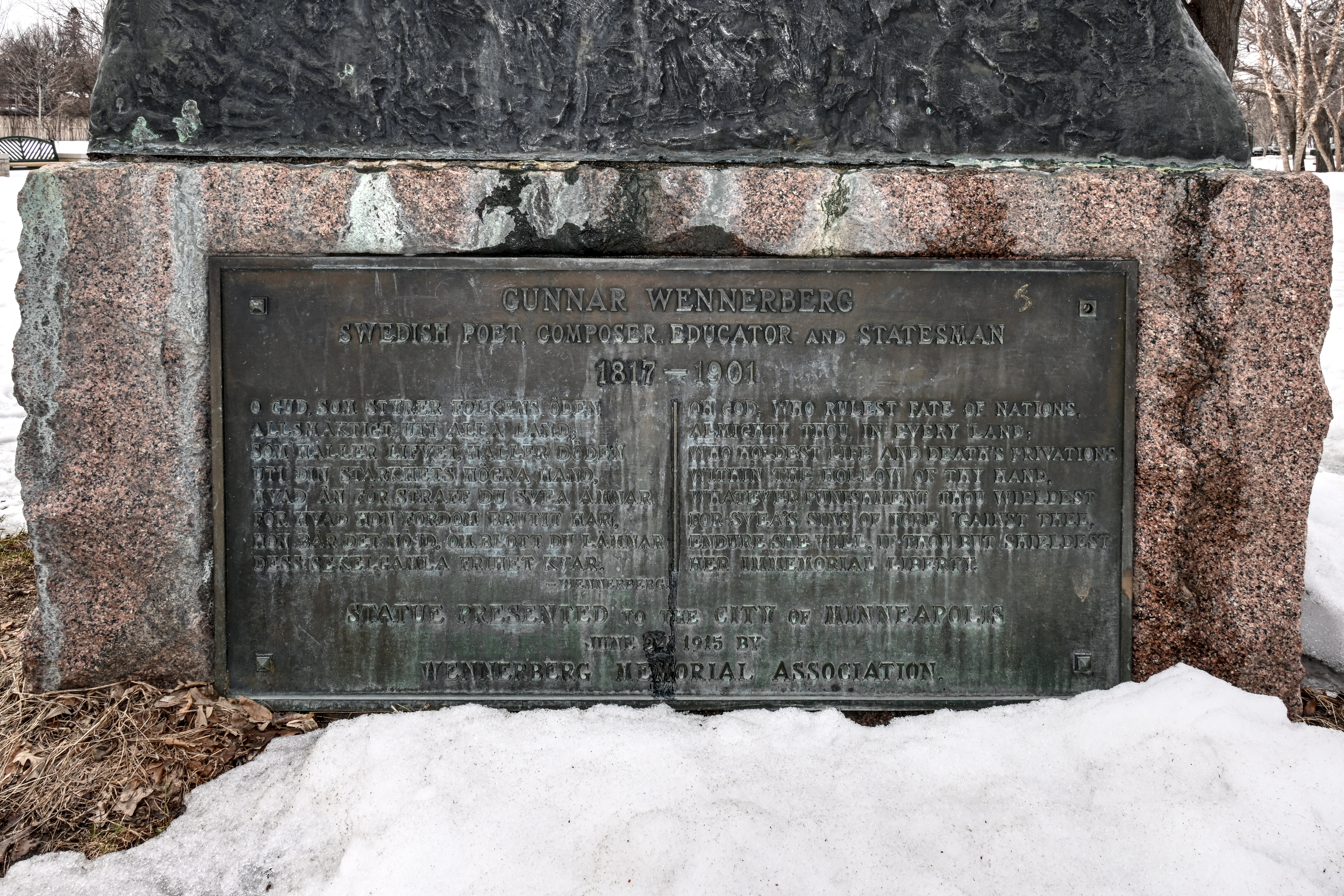
Plaque on Wennerberg's statue

In the second volume of his collected works, Wennerberg gave, long afterwards, a very interesting account of the inception and history of these celebrated duets. His great personal popularity, as the representative Swedish student, did not prevent him, however, from pursuing his studies, and he became an authority on Spinoza. In 1850 he first travelled through Sweden, singing and reciting in public, and his tour was a long popular triumph. In 1860 he published his collected trios, as De tre ("The Three"). In 1865, at the particular wish of the king, Charles XV, Wennerberg entered official life in the department of elementary education.

Wennerberg succeeded Christian Eric Fahlcrantz in 1866 as one of the eighteen of the Swedish Academy, and in 1870 became minister of education and ecclesiastical affairs in the cabinet of Axel Gustaf Adlercreutz, upon the fall of which in 1875 he retired for a time into private life. He was, however, made governor (landshövding) of Kronoberg County, and shortly afterward was elected to represent it in the Riksdag. His active parliamentary life continued until he was nearly eighty years of age. In 1881 and 1885 he issued his collected works, mainly in verse. He was yet again appointed minister of education and ecclesiastical affairs, for a second and final time in 1888, and served in office to 1891. After his resignation as a cabinet minister, he was then elected to the upper house of the Riksdag in 1893.Wennerberg preserved his superb appearance in advanced old age, and he died, after a very short illness, on 24 August 1901, at Lacko Castle, where he was visiting his brother-in-law, Count Axel Rudenschöld. His wife, the Countess Hedvig Cronstedt, whom he married in 1852, died in 1900. Wennerberg was a most remarkable type of the lyrical, ardent Swedish aristocrat, full of the joy of life and the beauty of it. In the long roll of his eighty-four years there was scarcely a crumpled roseleaf. His pod to which their musical accompaniment is almost essential, have not deceased, in half a century, to be universally pleasing o Swedish ears; outside Sweden it would be difficult to make their peculiarly local charm intelligible.

== Relatives ==
Wennerberg's niece Sara Wennerberg-Reuter (1875–1959) was also a well-known musician; she was an organist and composer. His younger brother, Gunnar Brynolf Wennerberg was an artist.

Cultural offices
Preceded by Christian Eric Fahlcrantz	Swedish Academy, Seat No 2; 1866–1901	Succeeded by Claes Annerstedt
