= Ferdinand von Řezníček =

Austrian caricaturist, painter and illustrator (1868–1909)

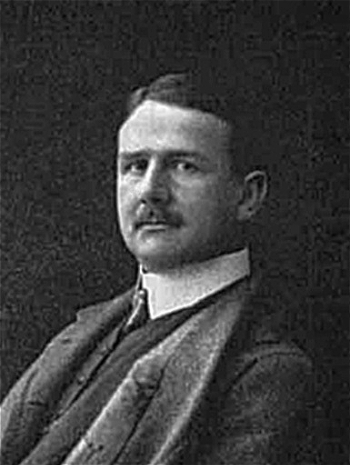
Ferdinand von Řezníček (c.1900)

Ferdinand Freiherr von Řezníček (16 June 1868, Sievering (now part of Vienna) - 11 May 1909, Munich) was an Austrian painter, illustrator, and graphic artist.

== Biography ==
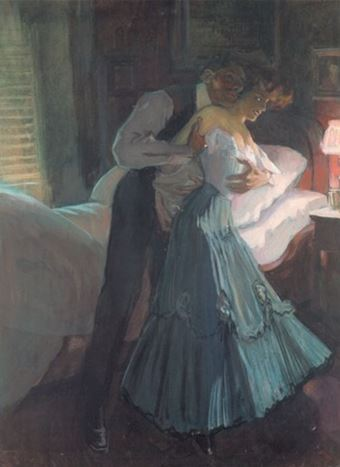
"The Eyes of the Canary"

He was born to General Josef Řezníček (1812–1886), who was raised to baronial rank in 1860, and his second wife, Hermine née Conrad (1839–1878), who came from an old Transylvanian family. The composer, Emil von Řezníček, was his half-brother from his father's first marriage, to Countess Clarisse Ghica (1837-1864). His primary education was at a Catholic school.

Following family tradition, he initially pursued a military career, becoming an officer in the cavalry, but gave in to his artistic inclinations after his father's death. His first employment as an artist and editor was at the satirical magazine, Kikeriki. Although he had a natural talent for that sort of work, he felt that he should obtain some formal instruction. He began with private lessons from Julius Victor Berger then, in 1888, he enrolled at the Academy of Fine Arts, Munich, where he studied with Paul Hoecker; focusing on outdoor painting.

After graduating, he decided to settle in Munich and worked as a commercial artist, then provided illustrations for a number of magazines, including Jugend and the Fliegende Blätter. In 1895, he became an editorial assistant for Albert Langen, who was creating a new magazine called Simplicissimus. His subtly erotic drawings contributed greatly to the success of that publication. In 1900, he met his future wife, Anny, who was working there as a model.

From 1902 until his death. his works were issued in portfolios with titles such as "The Gallant World", "In Private", and "People in Love". In addition to his magazine work, he provided illustrations for novels and short stories.

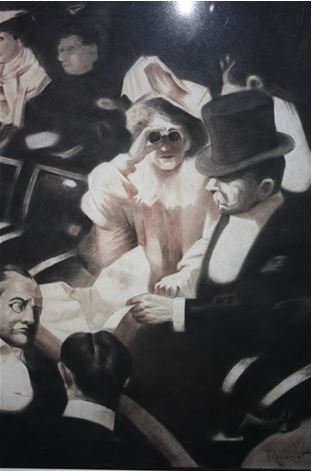
At the Opera

In 1906, he was diagnosed with an intestinal problem that became colon cancer. He died following surgery, less than two weeks after Langen died unexpectedly. His widow, Anny, married Brynolf Wennerberg, also one of the magazine's major illustrators. A few years after his death, his drawings for Simplicissimus were part of an exhibit held by the bookbinder, Georg Hulbe, at his new studio in Hamburg. The mayor's brother, Rudolf Mönckeberg, a conservative politician, found them obscene and charged Hulbe with creating a public nuisance.
