= Bevare Gud vår kung =

Former royal anthem of Sweden

English: God Save Our King
- Former royal anthem of Sweden
- Lyrics: Abraham Niclas Edelcrantz
- Music: Unknown, based on "God Save the King"
- Adopted: 1805
- Relinquished: 1893
- Succeeded by: Kungssången

Audio sample
- Bevare Gud vår kung (instrumental): file; help

Bevare Gud vår Kung (Swedish, 'God Save Our King') was the first royal anthem of Sweden. Written in 1805 by Abraham Niclas Edelcrantz to honor King Gustav IV Adolf, it was set to the melody of the British anthem "God Save the King". The song would serve as the de facto royal anthem from 1805 to 1893, when Kungssången was adopted as the official royal anthem.

== Lyrics ==
Swedish lyrics

I
Bevare Gud vår kung!
Gör säll vår ädle kung!
Leve vår kung!
Bekrönt av ärans hand,
alltid med hjärtats brand
förent med folk och land.
Leve vår kung!

II
Nu varje troget bröst
med hjärta och med röst
hans välgång sjung!
Må tvedräkt flykten ta!
Han allas kärlek ha!
Sjung, svenska Folk, hurra!
Leve vår kung!

English translation

I
God save our king!
Make joyous our noble king!
Long live our king!
Crowned by glory's hand,
always with fire in heart
united with people and land.
Long Live our King!

II
Now every faithful bosom
with heart and with voice
sing to his welfare!
May discord take to flight!
[May] he everyone's love have!
Sing, Swedish people, hurrah!
Long live our king!

== See also ==
- Kungssången
