= Louise Ahlén =

Swedish song writer (1857–1913)

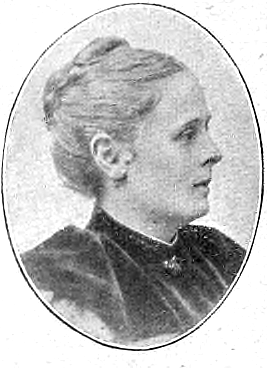
- Louise Ahlén c. 1913.
- Born: Louise Holmer; 28 November 1857; Kristianstad, Scania, Sweden
- Died: 24 May 1913; Stockholm, Sweden
- Resting place: Norra begravningsplatsen, Stockholm
- Occupation: Writer

Louise Ahlén (née Holmer; 28 November 1857 – 24 May 1913) was a Swedish writer most famous for her two added verses to the Swedish National anthem.

== Biography ==
Ahlén was born Louise Holmer on the 28 November 1857 in Kristianstad. In 1880 Louise married Abraham Ahlén who worked as a lecturer at Kristianstad's Higher Educational Institute (Swedish: Kristianstads högre allmänna läroverk).

== Additional lyrics to Du gamla, du fria ==
During the Dissolution of the union between Norway and Sweden Ahlén wrote two additional verses to the Swedish national anthem Du gamla, du fria. These additions were aimed to make the anthem more patriotic, in contrast to the original that was heavily inspired by the mid 19th-century's pan-Scandinavian Nationalism.

Here are Ahlén's lyrics to Du gamla, du fria:

Swedish original

I
Du gamla, Du fria, Du fjällhöga nord
Du tysta, Du glädjerika sköna!
Jag hälsar Dig, vänaste land uppå jord,
𝄆 Din sol, Din himmel, Dina ängder gröna. 𝄇

II
Du tronar på minnen från fornstora da'r,
då ärat Ditt namn flög över jorden.
Jag vet att Du är och Du blir vad Du var.
𝄆 Ja, jag vill leva, jag vill dö i norden. 𝄇

III
Jag städs vill dig tjäna, mitt älskade land,
dig trohet till döden vill jag svära!
Din rätt skall jag värna med håg och med hand,
𝄆 Din fana högt, den bragderika, bära! 𝄇

IV
Med Gud skall jag kämpa för hem och för härd,
för Sverige, den kära fosterjorden!
Jag byter dig ej emot allt i en värld:
𝄆 Nej, jag vill leva, jag vill dö i Norden! 𝄇

English translation

I
Thou ancient, thou free, thou mountainous north
Thou quiet, thou joyful beauty!
Thee I greet, loveliest land upon Earth,
𝄆 Thy sun, thy sky, thy green landscapes. 𝄇

II
Enthroned thou art upon memories of great olden days,
When honoured thy name flew across Earth,
I know that thou art and remain what thou wert,
𝄆 Yes, I want to live, I want to die in the North. 𝄇

III
I forever want to serve thee, my beloved country,
I swear to thee faithfulness unto death!
Thy right I shall protect with heart and with hand,
𝄆 Thy banner high, the mighty, shall bear! 𝄇

IV
With God I shall fight for home and for hearth,
for Sweden, the dearest Fatherland!
I shan't thee trade for most all in the world:
𝄆 No, I want to live, I want to die in the North! 𝄇
