= Mathias Lundholm =

Swedish violinist and conductor

Carl Mathias Lundholm (1785–1860) was a Swedish violinist and conductor. He studied violin in Paris with Pierre Baillot (1771–1842) from 1814 until 1816, and was teacher to both Ole Bull (1810–1880) and Otto Lindblad (1809–1864). From 1820 until 1827, he was principal conductor of Harmonien, which later became known as the Bergen Philharmonic Orchestra.
