= Richard Dybeck =

Swedish writer (1811–1877)

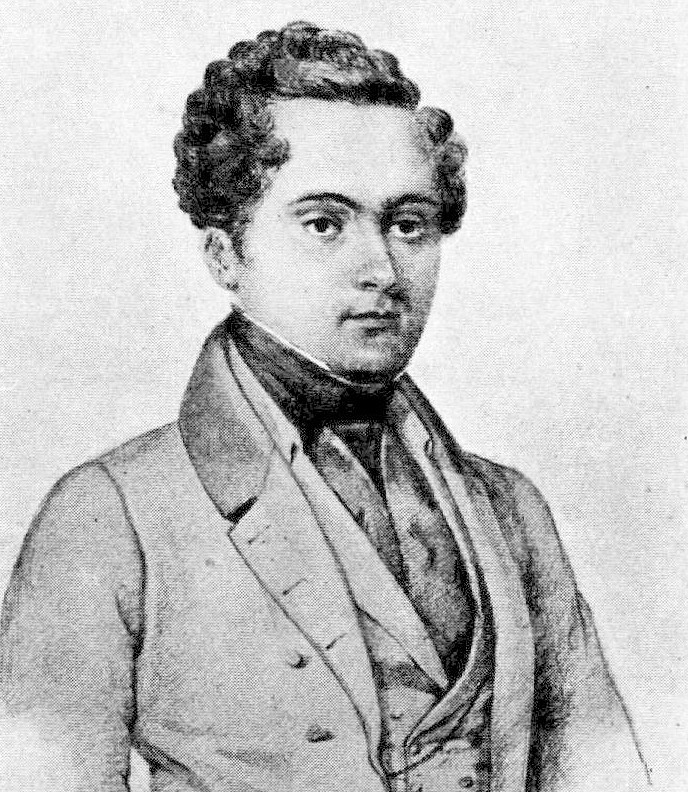
- Born: 1 September 1811; Köping Municipality, Sweden
- Died: 28 July 1877 (aged 65); Södertälje, Sweden
- Known for: Poetry
- Notable work: De facto Swedish national anthem, Du gamla, Du fria
- Spouse: Maria Charlotte Forsbom (1824-1865)

Richard Dybeck (1 September 1811 – 28 July 1877) was a Swedish jurist, antiquarian, and lyricist. He is mainly remembered as the author of the lyrics to what is now the de facto Swedish national anthem, Du gamla, Du fria.

== Biography ==
Dybeck was born in the rectory of Odensvi parish, just outside the town of Köping in Västmanland, Sweden. He was the son of a clergyman, went to gymnasium in Västerås, and later matriculated at Uppsala University in 1831 with a law degree. He completed his civil service degree in law (hovrättsexamen) in 1834 and entered the Svea Court of Appeal (Svea hovrätt). He held a number of positions in the court system during the following years, but eventually began to spend all his time on his antiquarian and historical research, not least in the field of runestones. Dybeck wrote many poems. He was also known to have a keen interest in Asian culture, as was seen by his collection of historic prints and lithographs which originated from places such as Myanmar and China. Dybeck died in 1877 at Södertälje and was buried at Norra begravningsplatsen in Stockholm.

At Dybecksgården in Odensvi, Richard Dybeck's bust is in bronze by Signe Ehrenborg-Lorichs, which was unveiled by Prince Wilhelm in 1937.
