= Kungssången =

Royal anthem of Sweden

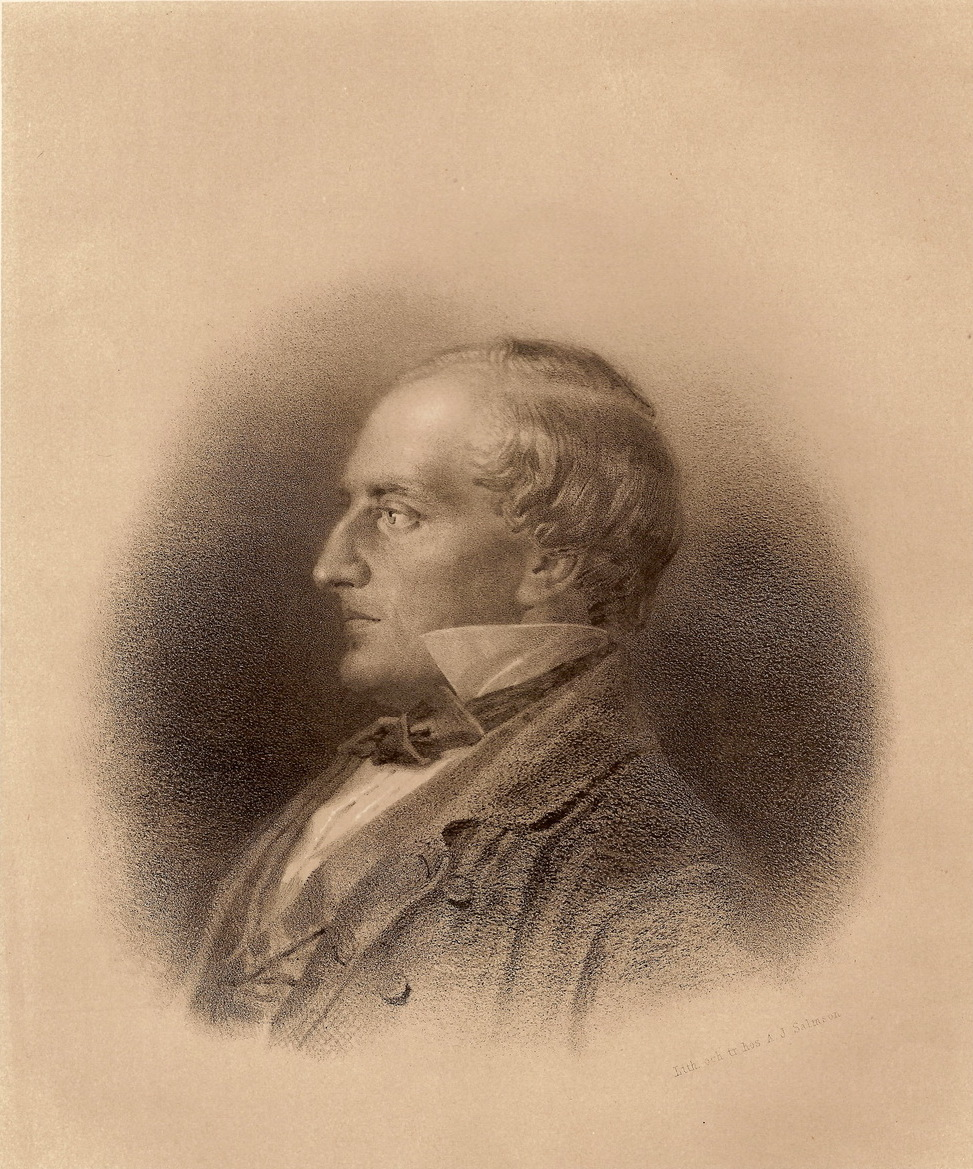
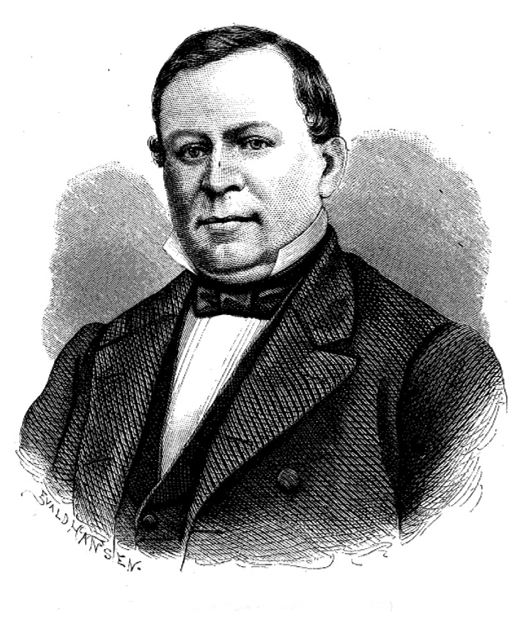
- Strandberg (top), Lindblad
- Royal anthem of Sweden
- Lyrics: Carl Vilhelm August Strandberg
- Music: Otto Lindblad
- Adopted: 1844

"Kungssången" (The King's Song) is the Swedish royal anthem. It is also known by its first line, "Ur svenska hjärtans djup en gång" (Once from the depths of Swedish hearts). Although sung on such occasions as the king's birthday, the annual opening of the Riksdag and the Nobel Prize ceremony, the song is not considered the Swedish national anthem. "Du gamla, du fria" is the de facto national anthem of Sweden, but has never been officially recognised.

The lyrics were written by Carl Vilhelm August Strandberg and the music composed for four part male chorus by Otto Lindblad. "Kungssången" replaced the previous royal anthem, "Bevare Gud vår kung", which was sung to the melody of the British royal anthem, "God Save the King". It was first performed in Lund on 5 December 1844 at a party arranged by the University to celebrate the accession of King Oscar I, and was adopted as the royal anthem in 1893.

Only the first verse (of five) is normally ever sung.

== Lyrics ==
Ur svenska hjärtans djup en gång
En samfälld och en enkel sång,
Som går till kungen fram!
Var honom trofast och hans ätt,
Gör kronan på hans hjässa lätt,
Och all din tro till honom sätt,
Du folk av frejdad stam!

== Melody ==
Source

== See also ==
- Gustafs skål, Gustav's toast (1772)
