= Carl Peter Hagberg =

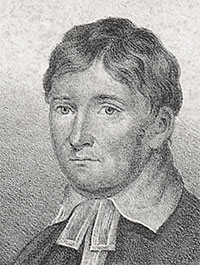
- Lithograph of Hagberg by unknown author.
- Born: 23 November 1778; Uppsala, Sweden
- Died: 15 September 1841 (aged 62); Stockholm, Sweden
- Occupations: Priest, educator

Carl Peter Hagberg (22 November 1778 – 15 September 1841) was a Swedish minister and orator who served in the Swedish Academy.

Hagberg became master of philosophy in 1803. The same year he was ordained as a minister and subsequently served as a preacher at the court, from 1808 with Queen dowager Sophia Magdalena. In 1809 he became the head of the theological seminary at Lund University. The same year he was awarded with a degree of doctor of theology. In 1811 he became professor of pastoral theology. In 1821 he became a member of the Swedish Academy. He also served as president of Pro Fide et Christianismo, a Christian education society.

Cultural offices
Preceded by Abraham Niclas Edelcrantz	Swedish Academy, Seat No.2; 1821–1941	Succeeded by Erik Fahlcrantz
