= Norges Skaal =

Norwegian anthem & drinking song (1771)

English: Norway’s Toast
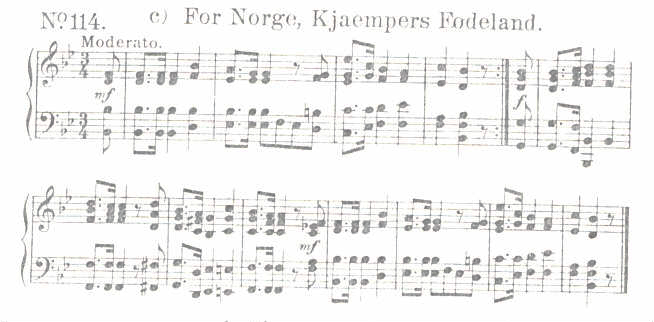
- Music sheet of Norges Skaal
- Former unofficial national anthem of Norway
- Lyrics: Johan Nordahl Brun
- Music: Ernest Modeste Grétry, 1771
- Adopted: 1782
- Relinquished: 1820

Audio sample
- Norges Skaal: file; help

Norges Skaal (English: Norway’s Toast) was written in 1771 by Johan Nordahl Brun in Copenhagen during the period when Norway was in a personal union with Denmark, as a drinking song for the Norwegian literary society in Copenhagen.

“Norges Skaal” (also sometimes referred to as “For Norge, Kiæmpers Fødeland” from the first line of the song) was banned by Danish-Norwegian officials in 1772 when it was first performed, and it gained popularity in the early 1800s when Norwegian nationalism was increasing. It quickly gained a reputation as being anti-Danish and revolutionary, and was referred to as "the Norwegian Marseillaise". It was first published in 1782, and was an unofficial national anthem of Norway from then on.

== Lyrics ==
For Norge, Kiæmpers Fødeland,
Vi denne Skaal vil tømme,
Og naar vi først faae Blod paa Tand,
Vi sødt om Frihed drømme;
Dog vaagne vi vel op engang
Og bryde Lænker, Baand og Tvang;
For Norge, Kjæmpers Fødeland,
Vi denne Skaal udtømme!

Hver tapper Helt, blandt Klipper fød,
Vi drikke vil til Ære;
Hver ærlig Norsk, som Lænker brød,
Skal evig elsket være!
Den vrede Livvagts Vaabenbrag
Forklarer trolig Nordmænds Sag.
Hver ærlig Norsk, blandt Klipper fød,
Vi drikke nu til Ære!

En Skaal for Dig, min kjække Ven,
Og for de norske Piger!
Og har Du en, saa Skaal for den!
Og Skam faae den, som sviger!
Og Skam faae den, som elsker Tvang
Og hader Piger, Viin og Sang!
En Skaal for Dig min kjække Ven,
Og for de norske Piger!

Og nok en Skaal for Norges Fjeld,
For Klipper, Snee og Bakker!
Hør Dovres Echo raabe: “Held!”
For Skaalen tre Gang takker.
Ja tre Gang tre skal alle Fjeld
For Norges Sønner raabe Held;
Endnu en Skaal for Dig mit Fjeld,
For Klipper, Snee og Bakker!

Translation:

For Norway, birthplace of warriors,
we this toast will empty,
and when we get a taste of it
we sweetly dream of freedom;
Though we will wake someday
and break chains, bonds and coercion.
For Norway, birthplace of warriors,
we this toast will empty!

Each brave hero, among cliffs born,
we will drink to honour;
Each honest Norwegian, who chains broke,
will forever be loved!
The wrathful guard’s crackling guns,
explains truthfully Norwegians’ cause.
Each honest Norwegian, among cliffs born,
We will drink to honour!

A toast to you, my handsome friend,
and to the Norwegian girls!
If you have one, then a toast to her,
and shame on those who betray!
Yes, shame on those who love coercion
and hate girls, wine and song!
A toast to you, my handsome friend,
and to the Norwegian girls!

And yet a toast to Norway’s mountains,
to cliffs, snow and hills!
Hear Dovre's echoes cry “Good luck!”
for its toast thricefold thanking.
Yes, thrifold three all mountains will
for Norway's sons cry "Good luck!"
Still yet a toast to you, my mountain,
to cliffs, snow and hills!

== See also ==
- Sønner av Norge
- Ja, vi elsker dette landet
