= Ja, vi elsker dette landet =

National anthem of Norway

English: 'Yes, We Love This Country'
- Sheet music with the coat of arms faded in the background
- National anthem of Norway
- Lyrics: Bjørnstjerne Bjørnson, c. 1859–1868
- Music: Rikard Nordraak, 1864
- Published: 17 May 1864; 162 years ago
- Adopted: 1864; 162 years ago
- Readopted: 11 December 2019; 6 years ago
- Preceded by: "Sønner av Norge"

Audio sample
- U.S. Navy Band instrumental version (one verse): file; help

"Ja, vi elsker dette landet" (Norwegian: [ˈjɑː viː ˈɛ̂lskə ˈɖɛ̂tːə ˈlɑ̀nːə]; lit. 'Yes, We Love This Country') is the national anthem of Norway. Originally a patriotic song, it became commonly regarded as the de facto national anthem of Norway in the early 20th century after being used alongside "Sønner av Norge" since the 1860s. It was officially adopted in 2019.

The lyrics were written by Bjørnstjerne Bjørnson between 1859 and 1868, and the melody was written by his cousin Rikard Nordraak sometime during the winter of 1863 to 1864. It was first performed publicly on 17 May 1864 in connection with the 50th anniversary of the constitution. Usually, only the first and the last two verses are sung, with the first being by far the most common.

== History ==
Until the mid-1860s, the songs "Sønner av Norge" and "Norges Skaal" were commonly regarded as the Norwegian national anthems, with "Sønner av Norge" being most recognised. "Ja, vi elsker dette landet" gradually came to be recognised as a national anthem from the mid-1860s. Until the early 20th century, however, both "Sønner av Norge" and "Ja, vi elsker" were used, with "Sønner av Norge" preferred in official situations. In 2011, the song "Mitt lille land" featured prominently in the memorial ceremonies following the 2011 Norway attacks and was described by the media as "a new national anthem". On Norwegian Constitution Day in 2012, NRK opened its broadcast with "Mitt lille land".

=== Background ===
Norway did not have an official national anthem until 11 December 2019, but over the last 200 years, several songs have been commonly regarded as de facto national anthems. At times, multiple songs have enjoyed this status simultaneously. "Ja, vi elsker dette landet" is now most often recognised as the anthem, but until the early 20th century, "Sønner av Norge" occupied this position.

In the early 19th century, the song "Norges Skaal" was regarded by many as a de facto national anthem. From 1820, the song "Norsk Nationalsang" (lit. 'Norwegian National Song') became the most recognised national anthem. It came to be known as "Sønner av Norge" (originally "Sønner af Norge") after its first stanza. "Sønner av Norge" was written by Henrik Anker Bjerregaard (1792–1842) and the melody by Christian Blom (1782–1861) after the Royal Norwegian Society for Development had announced a competition to write a national anthem for Norway in 1819. "Norsk Nationalsang" ("Sønner af Norge") was announced as the winner. Blant alle Lande (also called "Nordmandssang") by Ole Vig has also been used as a national anthem. Henrik Wergeland also wrote an anthem originally titled "Smaagutternes Nationalsang" (lit. 'The Young Boys' National Song') and commonly known as "Vi ere en Nation, vi med".

"Ja, vi elsker dette landet" was written by Bjørnstjerne Bjørnson and composed by Rikard Nordraak between 1859 and 1868, and gradually came to replace "Sønner av Norge" as the most recognised national anthem. Until the early 20th century, "Sønner av Norge" and "Ja, vi elsker dette landet" were used alongside each other, but "Sønner av Norge" was preferred in official settings. Since 2011, the anthem "Mitt lille land" by Ole Paus has also been called a "new national anthem" and notably featured in the memorial ceremonies following the 2011 Norway attacks. On Norwegian Constitution Day in 2012, the NRK broadcast opened with "Mitt lille land."

In addition, Norway has an unofficial royal anthem, "Kongesangen", based on "God Save the King" and written in its modern form by Gustav Jensen. The psalm "Gud signe vårt dyre fedreland", written by Elias Blix and with a melody by Christoph Ernst Friedrich Weyse, is often called Norway's "national psalm".

== Lyrics ==
Bjørnson wrote in a modified version of the Danish language used in Norway at the time. Written Bokmål has since been altered in a series of orthographic reforms intended to distinguish it from Danish and bring it closer to spoken Norwegian. The text below, commonly used today, is identical to Bjørnson's original in using the same words but with modernised spelling and punctuation. The most sung verses—1, 7 and 8 (which are highlighted and in bold)—have been modernised most and have several variations in existence. For example, Bjørnson originally wrote "drømme på vor jord", which some sources today write as "drømme på vår jord", while others write "drømmer på vår jord".

In each verse, the last two lines are sung twice, and one or two words are repeated an extra time when the lines are sung the second time (for example, "senker" in the first verse). These words are written in italics in the Norwegian lyrics below. The first verse is written down in full as an example.

Norwegian original

**Ja, vi elsker dette landet,**
**som det stiger frem,**
**furet, værbitt over vannet,**
**med de tusen hjem, —**
**elsker, elsker det og tenker**
**på vår far og mor**
**𝄆 og den saganatt som senker**
**drømmer (Note: Often written as drømme.) på vår jord. 𝄇**

Dette landet Harald berget
med sin kjemperad,
dette landet Håkon verget,
medens Øyvind kvad;
Olav på det landet malet (Note: Also written malte.)
korset med sitt blod,
𝄆 fra dets høye Sverre talet (Note: Also written talte.)
Roma midt imot. 𝄇

Bønder sine økser brynte
hvor en hær dro frem;
Tordenskjold langs kysten lynte,
så den lystes hjem.
Kvinner selv stod opp og strede
som de vare menn;
𝄆 andre kunne bare grede,
men det kom igjen! 𝄇

Visstnok var vi ikke mange,
men vi strakk dog til,
da vi prøvdes noen gange,
og det stod på spill;
ti vi heller landet brente
enn det kom til fall;
𝄆 husker bare hva som hendte
ned på Fredrikshald! 𝄇

Hårde tider har vi døyet,
ble til sist forstøtt;
men i verste (Note: Also written værste.) nød blåøyet
frihet ble oss født.
Det gav faderkraft å bære
hungersnød og krig,
𝄆 det gav døden selv sin ære —
og det gav forlik. 𝄇

Fienden sitt våpen kastet,
opp visiret fór,
vi med undren mot ham hastet,
ti han var vår bror.
Drevne frem på stand av skammen,
gikk vi søderpå;
𝄆 nå står vi tre brødre sammen, (Note: Also written nu vi står tre brødre sammen.)
og skal sådan stå! 𝄇

**Norske mann i hus og hytte,**
**takk din store Gud!**
**Landet ville han beskytte,**
**skjønt det mørkt så ut.**
**Alt, hva fedrene har kjempet,**
**mødrene har grett,**
**𝄆 har den Herre stille lempet,**
**så vi vant vår rett. 𝄇**

**Ja, vi elsker dette landet,**
**som det stiger frem,**
**furet, værbitt over vannet,**
**med de tusen hjem.**
**Og som fedres kamp har hevet**
**det av nød til seir,**
**𝄆 også vi, når det blir krevet,**
**for dets fred slår leir. 𝄇**

IPA transcription (Note: See Help:IPA/Norwegian and Norwegian phonology. The transcription is based on Urban East Norwegian; /r/'s are guttural in more western dialects, among other differences.)

**[jɑː ʋiː ˈɛ̂l.skɛ̠r ˈdɛ̂t.tə ˈlɑ̂n.nə]**
**[sɔm deː ˈstîː.ɡɛ̠r frɛm ‖]**
**[ˈfʉ̂ː.rɛt ˈʋæːr.bɪtː ˈoː.ʋɛ̠r ˈʋɑ̂n.nə]**
**[meː diː ˈtʉː.sən jɛm ‖]**
**[ˈɛ̂l.skɛ̠r ˈɛ̂l.skɛ̠r deː ɔ ˈtɛ̂ŋ.kɛ̠r |]**
**[poː ʋoːr fɑːr ɔ muːr ‖]**
**𝄆 [ɔ dɛn ˈsɑː.ɡɑ.nɑtː sɔm ˈsɛ̂ŋ.kɛ̠r |]**
**[ˈdrœm.mə(r) poː ʋoːr juːr ‖] 𝄇**

[ˈdɛ̂t.tə ˈlɑ̂n.nə ˈhɑː.rɑld ˈbæ̂ɾ.ɡɛ̠t]
[meː sɪn ˈçɛm.pə.rɑːd ‖]
[ˈdɛ̂t.tə ˈlɑ̂n.nə ˈhoː.kʊn 'ʋæ̂ɾ.ɡɛ̠t]
[ˈmeː.dɛ̠ns ˈœʏ̯.ʋɪn(d) kʋɑːd ‖]
[ˈuː.lɑʋ poː deː ˈlɑ̂n.nə ˈmɑː.lət |]
[ˈkɔ.ʂə meː sɪtː bluː ‖]
𝄆 [frɑː dɛts ˈhœʏ̯.ə ˈsʋæ.rə ˈtɑː.lət |]
[ˈruː.mɑ mɪtː ɪ.ˈmuːd ‖] 𝄇

[ˈbœ̀n.nər ˈsiː.nə ˈœk.sər ˈbryn.tə]
[vur eːn hæːr druː frɛm ‖]
[ˈtur.dən.ʂɔl lɑŋs ˈçys.tən ˈlyn.tə]
[sɔː dɛn ˈlys.təs jɛm ‖]
[ˈkʋɪn.nər sɛl stuː ɔpː ɔ ˈstreː.də |]
[sɔm diː ˈʋɑː.rə mɛnː ‖]
𝄆 [ˈɑn.dre ˈkʉn.nə ˈbɑː.rə ˈgreː.də |]
[mɛn deː kɔm ɪ.ˈjɛn ‖] 𝄇

[ˈʋɪst.nɔk ʋɑːr ʋiː ˈɪ̂k.kə ˈmɑŋ.ə]
[mɛn ʋiː strɑk doːɡ tɪl ‖]
[dɑː ʋiː ˈprœʋ.dəs ˈnuː.ən ˈgɑŋ.ə]
[ɔ deː stuː poː spɪl ‖]
[tiː ʋiː ˈhɛl.lər ˈlɑ̂n.nə ˈbrɛn.tə |]
[ɛnː deː kɔm tɪl fɑlː ‖]
𝄆 [ˈhʉs.kɛ̠r ˈbɑː.rə ʋɑː sɔm ˈhɛn.tə |]
[neː(d) poː ˈfrɛd.rɪks.hɑld ‖] 𝄇

[ˈhoːr.də ˈtiː.dər hɑːr ʋiː ˈdœʏ̯.ət]
[bleː tɪl sɪst ˈfɔʂ.tœt ‖]
[mɛn iː ˈʋæ̂ʂː.tə nœːd ˈbloː.œʏ̯.ət]
[ˈfriː.heːt bleː ɔsː fœtː ‖]
[deː ɡɑːʋ ˈfɑ̂ː.dɛ̠r.krɑft ɔː ˈbæː.rə |]
[ˈhuŋ.əʂ.nœːd ɔ kriːɡ ‖]
𝄆 [deː ɡɑːʋ dœː.dən sɛl sɪn ˈæː.rə |]
[ɔ deː ɡɑːʋ fɔrː.ˈliːk ‖] 𝄇

[ˈfîː.ɛn.dən sɪtː ˈʋoː.pən ˈkɑs.tət]
[ɔpː ʋɪ.ˈsiː.rə fuːr ‖]
[ʋiː meː ˈʉnd.reːn muːt hɑm ˈhɑs.tət]
[tiː hɑn ʋɑːr ʋoːr bruːr ‖]
[ˈdreːʋ.nə frɛm poː stɑnː ɑːʋ ˈskɑm.mən |]
[gɪk ʋiː sœː.dər.poː ‖]
𝄆 [noː stoːr ʋiː treː ˈbrœd.rə ˈsɑm.mən |]
[ɔ skal ˈsɔː.dɑn stoː ‖] 𝄇

**[ˈnɔʂ.kɛ̠ mɑnː iː hʉːs ɔ ˈhŷt.tə]**
**[tɑk dɪn stuː.rə ɡʉːd ‖]**
**[ˈlɑ̂n.nə ˈʋɪl.lə hɑnː bɛ.ˈʂyt.tə]**
**[ʂœnːt deː mœrkt sɔː ʉːt ‖]**
**[ɑlt ʋɑː ˈfeːd.rə.nə hɑːr ˈçɛm.pət |]**
**[mœd.rə.nə hɑːr ɡrɛtː ‖]**
**𝄆 [hɑːr dɛn ˈhæ.rə ˈstɪ̂l.lə ˈlɛm.pət |]**
**[sɔː ʋiː ʋɑnt ʋoːr rɛtː ‖] 𝄇**

**[jɑː ʋiː ˈɛ̂l.skɛ̠r ˈdɛ̂t.tə ˈlɑ̂n.nə]**
**[sɔm deː ˈstîː.ɡɛ̠r frɛm ‖]**
**[ˈfʉ̂ː.rɛt ˈʋæːr.bɪtː ˈoː.ʋɛ̠r ˈʋɑ̂n.nə]**
**[meː diː ˈtʉː.sən jɛm ‖]**
**[ɔ sɔm ˈfeːd.rɛ̠s kɑmp hɑːr ˈheː.ʋət |]**
**[deː ɑːʋ nœːd tɪl sæɪ̯r ‖]**
**𝄆 [ɔ.sɔː ʋiː nor deː blɪr ˈkreː.ʋət |]**
**[fɔrː dɛts freːd ʂloːr læɪ̯r ‖] 𝄇**

Literal translation

**Yes, we love this land,**
**as it rises,**
**furrowed, weather-beaten over the water,**
**with its thousand homes, —**
**love, love it and think**
**of our father and mother**
**𝄆 and the legendary night that lowers**
**dreams upon our earth. 𝄇**

This country Harald united
with his army of heroes,
this country Håkon protected
whilst Øyvind sung;
upon the country Olav painted
with his blood the cross,
𝄆 from its heights Sverre spoke
up against Rome. 𝄇

Farmers their axes sharpened
wherever an army advanced,
Tordenskjold along the coastline thundered
so that we could see it back home.
Even women stood up and fought
as if they were men;
𝄆 others could only cry
but that soon would end! 𝄇

Sure, we were not many
but we were enough,
when we were tested sometimes,
and it was at stake;
we would rather burn our land
than to declare defeat;
𝄆 just remember what happened
down at Fredrikshald! 𝄇

Hard times we have coped with,
were at last disowned;
but in the worst distress, blue-eyed (Note: "Blue-eyed" (blåøyd) here means 'innocent'; it is derived from the eye color of newborn babies.)
freedom was to us born.
It gave us father's strength to carry
famine and war,
𝄆 it gave death itself its honour –
and it gave reconciliation. 𝄇

The enemy threw away his weapon,
up the visor went,
we, in wonder, to him hastened,
because he was our brother.
Driven forth to a stand by shame
we went to the south;
𝄆 now we three brothers stand united,
and shall stand like that! 𝄇

**Norwegian man in house and cabin,**
**thank your great God!**
**The country he wanted to protect,**
**although things looked dark.**
**All that the fathers have fought [for],**
**and the mothers have wept [over],**
**𝄆 the Lord has quietly eased**
**so we won our rights. 𝄇**

**Yes, we love this country**
**as it rises forth,**
**rugged, weathered, above the sea,**
**with those thousand homes.**
**And as the fathers' struggle has raised**
**it from need to victory,**
**𝄆 even we, when it is demanded,**
**for its peace will encamp. 𝄇**

== Poetic translation and metric version ==
Two alternative metrical versions also exist. The second closely follows the original and was learned by heart by a Norwegian who did not know the translator's name. It was published (without the translator's name) in a collection of Sange og digte paa dansk og engelsk (transl. Songs and Poems in Danish and English). There are two minor changes in the text in this version, which are presented here. Verse 2, which is seldom sung, has been omitted, and the last two lines in each verse are repeated in the same way as sung in Norwegian.

I
Norway, thine is our devotion,
Land of hearth and home,
Rising storm-scarr'd from the ocean,
Where the breakers foam.
Oft to thee our thoughts are wending,
Land that gave us birth,
And to saga nights still sending
Dreams upon our earth,
And to saga nights still sending
Dreams upon us on our earth

VII
Men of Norway, be your dwelling
Cottage, house or farm,
Praise the Lord who all compelling
Sav'd our land from harm.
Not the valour of a father
On the battlefield
Nor a mother's tears, but rather
God our vict'ry sealed,
Nor a mother's tears, but rather
God for us our vict'ry sealed.

VIII
Norway, thine is our devotion,
Land of hearth and home,
Rising storm-scarr'd from the ocean,
Where the breakers foam.
As our fathers' vict'ry gave it
Peace for one and all,
We shall rally, too, to save it
When we hear the call,
We shall rally, too, to save it
When we hear, we hear the call.

I
Yes, we love this land arising
Stormbeat o'er the sea
With its thousand homes, enticing,
Rugged though it be.
Love it, love it, not forgetting
Those we owe our birth,
Nor that night of saga letting
Down its dreams to earth,
Nor that night of saga letting
Down its dreams, its dreams, to earth.

VII
Norseman, where thou dwellest, render
Praise and thanks to Him,
Who has been this land's defender,
When its hopes looked dim.
Wars our fathers' aims unfolded,
Tears our mothers shed,
Roads of them for us He molded,
To our rights they led.
Roads of them for us He molded,
To our rights, our rights, they led.

VIII
Yes, we love this land arising
Stormbeat o'er the sea
With its thousand homes, enticing,
Rugged though it be.
Like our fathers who succeeded,
Warring for release,
So will we, whenever needed,
Rally for its peace.
So will we, whenever needed,
Rally for its peace, its peace.

== Deleted verse a tribute to King Charles IV ==
The original version of "Ja, vi elsker" included a verse hailing Charles IV, who succeeded his father as king of Norway in July 1859. However, after the divisive international events of the spring of 1864, including the Second Schleswig War, when the ideal of a unified Scandinavia became shattered, Bjørnson went from monarchist to republican, and the tribute to the reigning sovereign was stricken from the song.

The lyrics that were removed were:

Kongen selv står stærk og åpen
som vår Grænsevagt
og hans allerbedste Våpen
er vår Broderpagt.

In English, this reads:

The King himself stands strong and open
As our border guard
and his most powerful weapon
is our brethren pact.

The "brethren pact" the text refers to was a military treaty between Norway, Sweden and Denmark to assist one another should any of them come under military assault. But when German troops invaded South Jutland in February 1864, none of the alliance partners came to Denmark's rescue. This perceived treason of the "brethren pact" once and for all shattered dreams of unification of the three countries.

== Controversies ==
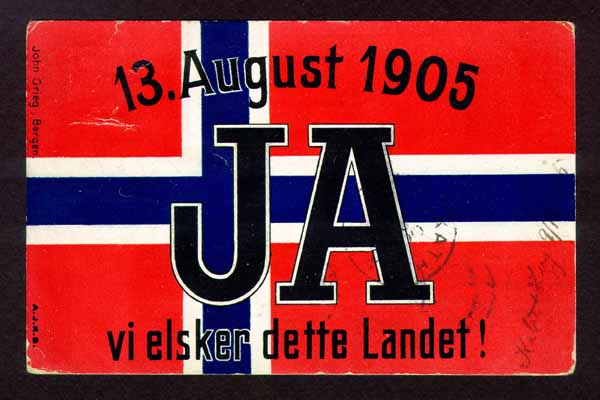
A postcard from around the time of the 1905 Norwegian union dissolution referendum

=== Norwegian independence ===
In 1905, the Union between Sweden and Norway was dissolved after many years of Norwegian struggle for equality between the two states, as stipulated in the 1815 Act of Union. The unilateral declaration by the Norwegian Storting of the union's dissolution on 7 June provoked strong Swedish reactions, bringing the two nations to the brink of war in the autumn. In Sweden, pro-war conservatives were opposed by the Social Democrats, whose leaders, Hjalmar Branting and Zeth Höglund, spoke out for reconciliation and a peaceful settlement with Norway. Swedish socialists sang "Ja, vi elsker dette landet" to support the Norwegian people's right to secede from the union.

=== Nazi occupation ===
During World War II, the anthem was used both by the Norwegian resistance and the Nazi collaborators, the latter mainly for propaganda reasons. Eventually, the German occupiers officially forbade any use of the anthem.

=== Urdu translation ===
In May 2006, the multicultural newspaper Utrop proposed that the national anthem be translated into Urdu, the native language of one of the most numerous groups of recent immigrants to Norway. The editor's idea was that people from other ethnic groups should be able to honour their adopted country with devotion, even if they were not fluent in Norwegian. This proposal was referred to by other more widely read papers, and a member of the Storting called the proposal "integration in reverse". One proponent of translating the anthem received batches of hate mail calling her a traitor and threatening her with decapitation.

== See also ==
- Flag of Norway
- Coat of arms of Norway
