= Christian Blom =

Norwegian ship owner and composer

Christian Blom (20 October 1782 – 22 April 1861) was a Norwegian ship owner and composer.

Blom was born at Tønsberg in Vestfold, Norway. He was the son of Jan Blom (1748–1832) and Anne Cathrine Heegaard (1757–1837). His father was a magistrate and a cousin, Gustav Peter Blom (1785–1869), was County Governor of Buskerud Amt (now Buskerud). He attended the University of Copenhagen. He later moved to Drammen to work in shipping.

Christian Blom is most associated with his music. Blom's compositions included almost 40 songs, 4 chamber works, an orchestral overture and a few small choral movements. His best-known work was the melody to Norway's former national anthem, Sønner av Norge, with lyrics by Henrik Anker Bjerregaard.

== Personal life ==
Blom was married twice. In 1812 with Susanne Catharine Blom (1788–1834), daughter of merchant Peter Blom (1743–1825) and Marie Staud (1758–1833). In 1839 with Johanne Marie Mathilde Strauch Bohse (1799–1861).
