= Henrik Anker Bjerregaard =

Norwegian poet, dramatist and judge (1792–1842)

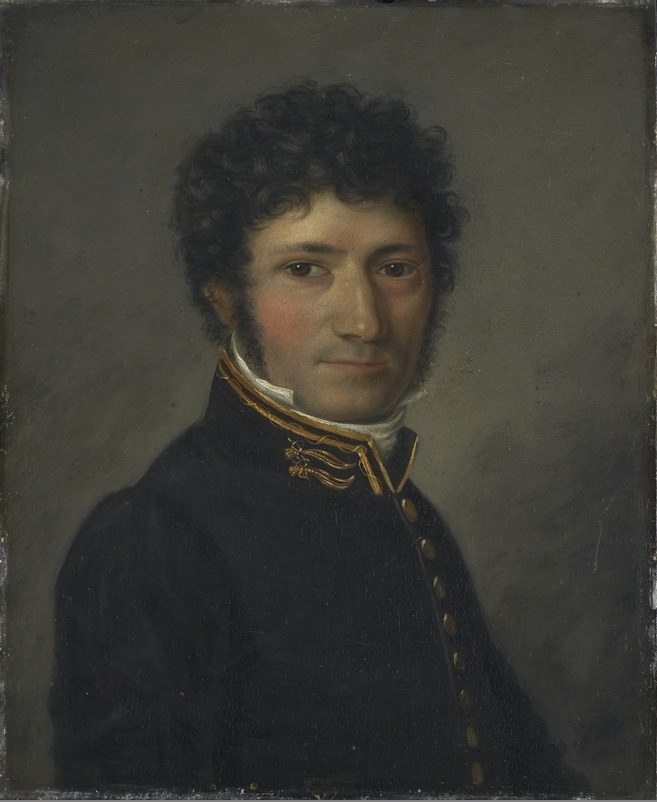
Henrik Anker Bjerregaard painted by Jacob Munch.

Henrik Anker Bjerregaard (1 January 1792 – 7 April 1842) was a Norwegian poet, dramatist and judge.

Born in the prestegjeld of Ringsaker to Mads Bjerregard and Alet Ørtlien, he grew up in Vågå from the age of eight. He studied at the University of Copenhagen, but returned to Norway in 1814 and graduated from the Royal Frederick University with the cand.jur. degree in 1815. He climbed the career ladder as a jurist, was a solicitor and chief justice in the diocesan court of Christiania before being appointed as a Supreme Court Assessor in 1830. He remained in this position until his death.

Bjerregaard was also a prominent lyricist. Together with Conrad Nicolai Schwach and Maurits Hansen he was among the most important lyricists after Norway's independence in 1814, in the generation before Henrik Wergeland and Johan Sebastian Welhaven. According to the 1911 Encyclopædia Britannica, Bjerregaard had a "varied talent", and his body of work contains "some charming studies from nature, and admirable patriotic songs". In 1820, Bjerregaard had entered a contest to write the new national anthem of Norway, and his hymn Sønner af Norge, melody written by Christian Blom, was selected as the winner. The song stood as the national anthem of Norway until 1864, when Ja, vi elsker dette landet was written. Bjerregaard also wrote plays, including Fjeldeventyret (1825) and Magnus Barfods Sønner (1830), and was a theatre critic. However, he largely ceased his literary production after his 1830 appointment as Supreme Court Assessor.

Bjerregaard was married to actress Henriette Hansen, who was several years his junior. He died on April 7, 1842, aged 50, and was buried at Vår Frelsers gravlund. The road Bjerregaards gate in Oslo has been named after him.
