= Sønner av Norge =

Norwegian patriotic song

English: 'Sons of Norway'
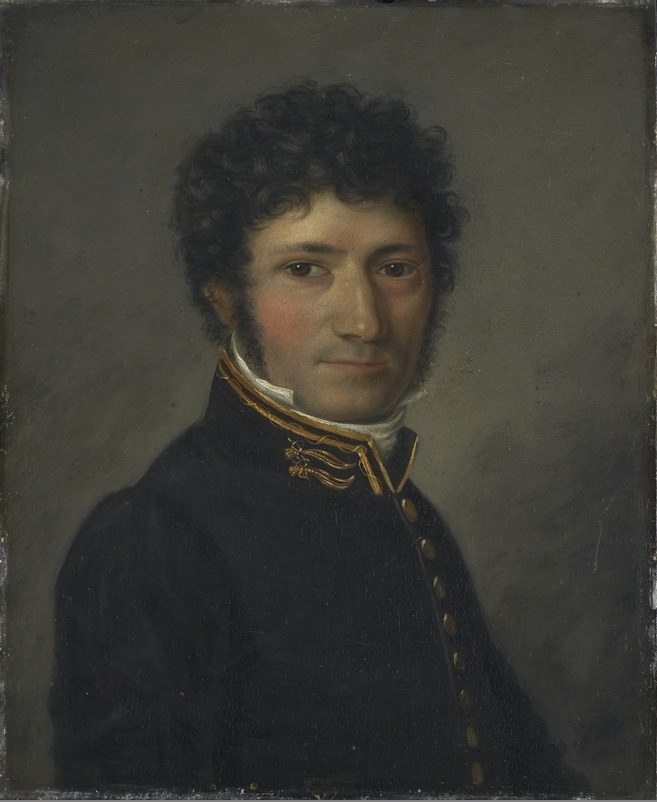
- Henrik Anker Bjerregaard who wrote the anthem lyrics
- Former de facto national anthem of Norway
- Lyrics: Henrik Anker Bjerregaard
- Music: Christian Blom
- Adopted: 1820
- Relinquished: 1864
- Succeeded by: "Ja, vi elsker dette landet”

"Sønner av Norge" (Note: It was originally spelt "Sønner af Norge" in the original Norwegian orthography.) ('Sons of Norway') is the common title of the song "Norsk Nationalsang" ('Norwegian National Song'), which was the de facto national anthem of Norway from 1820 until the early 20th century. From the mid-1860s, "Ja, vi elsker dette landet" ('Yes, We Love This Land') gradually came to occupy the unofficial position as national anthem, but was used alongside "Sønner af Norge" until the early 20th century, with "Sønner af Norge" being preferred in official situations.

== History ==
The lyrics were written by Henrik Anker Bjerregaard (1792–1842) and the melody by Christian Blom (1782–1861), after the Royal Norwegian Society for Development had announced a competition to write a national anthem for Norway in 1819. "Norsk Nationalsang" ("Sønner af Norge") was announced as the winner.

== Lyrics ==
Norwegian original

Original text

Sønner af Norge, det ældgamle Rige,
Sjunger til Harpens den festlige Klang!
Mandigt og høitidsfuldt Tonen lad stige,
Fædrenelandet indvies vor Sang.
Fædreneminder herligt oprinder,
Hvergang vi nævne vor Fædrenestavn.
Svulmende Hjerter og glødende Kinder
Hylde det elskte, det hellige Navn!

Flyver vor Aand til de hensvundne Tider,
herligt den skuer vort Fædrelands Glands;
Kæmpere gange om Dovrefjelds Sider,
Vandre til Ledingefærd som til Dands.
Mandige Skarer Bølgen befarer,
Norriges Ros bær til fjerneste Kyst;
Hjemme er Kæmpere nok som forsvarer
Arvede Frihed med modige Bryst.

Medens de Staalklædte prøve sin Styrke,
Medens de stande i kjæmpende Rad,
Skjalde og Sagamænd Kunsterne dyrke,
Riste i Runer de herligste Qvad.
Konninger bolde Scepteret holde,
Røgte med Viisdom det hellige Kald;
Gjennem Aarhundreders Nat deres Skjolde
Gjenstraale klart i Erindringens Hal.

Oldtid! du svandt; men din hellige Flamme
Blusser i Nordmandens Hjerte endnu:
End er af Æt og af Kraft han den Samme,
End staaer til Frihed og Ære hans Hu;
Og naar han kvæder Norriges Hæder,
Svulmer hans Hjerte af Stolthed og Lyst;
Ham er selv Sydens de yndigste Steder
Intet mod Norriges sneedækte Kyst.

Frihedens Tempel i Nordmandens Dale
Stander saa herligt i Lye af hans Fjeld;
Frit tør han tænke, og frit tør han tale,
Frit tør han virke til Norriges Held.
Fuglen i Skove, Nordhavets Vove
Friere er ei end Norriges Mand;
Villig dog lyder han selvgivne Love,
Trofast mod Konning og Fædreneland.

Elskede Land med de skyhøie Bjerge,
Frugtbare Dale og fiskrige Kyst!
Troskap og Kjærlighed fro vi dig sverge;
Kalder du, bløde vi for dig med Lyst.
Evig du stande, elskte blandt Lande!
Frit som den Storm der omsuser dit Fjeld!
Og medens Bølgen omsnoer dine Strande,
Stedse du voxe i Hæder og Held!

Modern text

Sønner av Norge, det eldgamle rike,
sjunger til harpens den festlige klang!
Mandig og høytidsfullt tonen la stige!
Fedrenelandet innvies vår sang.
Fedreneminner herlig opprinner
hver gang vi nevner vår fedrenestavn.
Svulmende hjerter og glødende kinner
hyller det elskte, det hellige navn.

Flyger vår ånd til de hensvundne tider,
herlig den skuer vårt fedrelands glands;
Kjempere gange om dovrefjelds sider,
Vandre til ledingeferd som til dands.
Mandige skarer bølgen befarer,
Norriges ros bær til fjerneste kyst;
Hjemme er kjempere nok som forsvarer
Arvede frihed med modige bryst.

Medens de stålkledde prøve sin styrke,
Medens de stande i kjempende rad,
Skjalde og sagamænd kunsterne dyrke,
Riste i runer de herligste kvat.
Konninger bolde septeret holde,
Røgte med visdom det hellige kald;
Gjennem århundreders natt deres skjolde
Gjenstråle klart i erindringens hal.

Oldtid, du svant, men din hellige flamme
blusser i nordmannens hjerte ennu;
enn er av ætt og av kraft han den samme,
enn står til frihet og ære hans hu,
og når han kveder Norriges heder,
svulmer hans hjerte av stolthet og lyst.
Ham er selv Sydens de yndigste steder
intet mot Norriges snedekte kyst.

Frihedens tempel i Nordmandens dale
Stander så herligt i lye av hans fjeld;
Fritt tør han tenke, og fritt tør han tale,
Fritt tør han virke til Norriges held.
Fuglen i skove, Nordhavets vove
Friere er ei end Norriges mand;
Villig dog lyder han selvgivne love,
Trofast mot konning og fedreneland.

Elskede land med de skyhøye bjerge,
Fruktbare dale og fiskrige kyst!
Troskab og kjærlighed frå vi dig sverge;
Kalder du, bløde vi for dig med Lyst.
Evig du stande, elskte blant lande!
Fritt som den storm der omsuser ditt fjeld!
Og medens bølgen omsnoer dine strande,
Stedse du vokse i heder og held!

English translation

Sons of Norway, the olden kingdom,
sing to the harps the festive sounds!
Manly and full of solemnity let the music rise,
Our song consecrateth the ancestral land.
Memories of ancestors gloriously return,
each time we mention our ancestral roots.
Hearts swelling with pride and glowing cheeks
hail the beloved, the sacred name;

Our spirits fly to the foregone ages,
Beholding our fatherland's glory;
Warriors walked along the peaks of Dovre,
to Ledingefærd they hiked like a dance.
Crowds of men bring by the waves,
Norway's pride to distant coasts;
At home, we have warriors who will defend
Inherited freedoms with brave hearts.

While the steel-clad test their strength,
While they in fighting rows stand,
Poets and storytellers cultivate their art,
Carving in runes the finest of verses.
Bold kings hold the sceptre
With wisdom followed the holy call;
Through the night of centuries their shields
Shine clearly in the hall of memory.

Olden past, thou disappeared, but thy holy flame
blazeth still in Norwegian heart.
One is by family and by power the same,
One standeth for freedom and memory of its fame.
And whenever he chanteth Norway's glory,
his heart swelleth with pride and desire;
To him are even the loveliest places of the south
Nothing compared to Norway's snow-covered coast.

The temple of freedom in Norwegian valleys
Stands so magnificent sheltered by his mountains;
Freely he dareth think, and freely he dareth talk,
Freely he dareth work in Norway's favour.
The fowl in the forest, the inlets of the North Sea
None are freer than the Norwegian;
Willingly though he followeth self-given laws,
Faithful to King and Fatherland.

Beloved land with the skyscraping mountains,
Fertile valleys and coast rich with fish!
Allegiance and love we pledge to thee,
If thou upon us callest, we will happily bleed for thee.
Eternal thou standest, beloved among all lands!
Free like the storm that blows around thy mountains!
And while waves envelop thy beaches,
Forever thou shalt grow in glory and luck!
