= Stenbeck =

Stenbeck is Swedish language surname. It may refer to:

- Cristina Stenbeck (born 1977), American businesswoman
- Hugo Stenbeck (1890–1977), Swedish lawyer
- Jan Stenbeck (1942–2002), Swedish businessman
- Margaretha Stenbeck (born 1939), Swedish politician
- Max Stenbeck (1985–2015), American businessman

== Fiction ==
- Barbara Stenbeck, fictional character on the television series As the World Turns
- James Stenbeck, fictional character on the television series As the World Turns
- Lucinda Stenbeck, fictional character on the television series As the World Turns
- Paul Stenbeck, fictional character on the television series As the World Turns

== See also ==
- Steenbeck (surname)
- Steinbach (surname)
- Steinbacher
- Steinbeck (surname)
- Stenbäck
