= Stainbank (surname) =

Stainbank is a surname. Notable people with the surname include:

- Euan Stainbank (born 2000), Scottish politician
- Mary Stainbank (1899–1996), South African sculptor

== See also ==
- Stainback
- Stanback
- Steinbeck
- Stenbeck
