= Steenbeck (surname) =

Steenbeck is surname of:

- Max Christian Theodor Steenbeck (1904–1981), German physicist
- Wilhelm Steenbeck (1896–1975), German engineer

- Steenbeck, a brand name

== See also ==
- Stenbeck
- Stenbeke
- Steinbeck
- Steinbach
- Steinbacher
