= Steinbach =

Steinbach may refer to:

== Businesses ==
- Steinbach (store), a defunct American department store chain in Asbury Park, New Jersey
- Steinbach Credit Union, a Canadian credit union in Manitoba
- Worthmann & Steinbach, a defunct American architectural firm in Chicago

== Name ==
- Steinbach (surname), a German surname

== Places ==
=== Austria ===
- Steinbach am Attersee, in the district of Vöcklabruck
- Steinbach am Ziehberg, in the district of Kirchdorf an der Krems
- Steinbach an der Steyr, in the district of Kirchdorf an der Krems

=== Belgium ===
- Steinbach, Gouvy, a village in the municipality of Gouvy

=== Canada ===
- Steinbach, Manitoba, a city in southeastern Manitoba and largest community with this name
  - Steinbach (electoral district), a provincial riding encompassing the city of Steinbach and surrounding area

=== France ===
- Steinbach, Haut-Rhin, a commune in the Haut-Rhin département

=== Germany ===
- Steinbach (Baden), a locality of Baden-Baden, Baden-Württemberg
- Steinbach, Eichsfeld, a municipality in the district of Eichsfeld, Thuringia
- Steinbach (Fürstenfeldbruck), a locality of Moorenweis, Bavaria
- Steinbach-Hallenberg, a town in Thuringia
- Steinbach (Johannesberg), a locality of Johannesberg, Bavaria
- Steinbach (Külsheim), a locality of Külsheim, Baden-Württemberg
- Steinbach, Rhein-Hunsrück in the Rhein-Hunsrück district, Rhineland-Palatinate
- Steinbach (Taunus), in Hesse
- Steinbach, Wartburgkreis, a municipality in Thuringia
- Steinbach am Donnersberg in the Donnersbergkreis, Rhineland-Palatinate
- Steinbach am Glan in the district of Kusel, Rhineland-Palatinate
- Steinbach am Wald, a municipality in the district of Kronach in Bavaria
- Steinbach, part of the City of Lebach in Saarland

== Rivers of Germany ==
- Steinbach (Sassnitz), of Mecklenburg-Vorpommern, in Sassnitz
- Steinbach (Vilicher Bach), of North Rhine-Westphalia, in the district Beuel of Bonn
- Steinbach (Laerbach), of Lower Saxony and of North Rhine-Westphalia, tributary of the Laerbach
- Steinbach (Bühler), of Baden-Württemberg, tributary of the Bühler
- Steinbach (Jagst), of Baden-Württemberg, tributary of the Jagst
- Steinbach (Gersprenz), of Hesse, tributary of the Gersprenz
- Steinbach (Nidda), of Hesse, tributary of the Nidda
- Steinbach (Hafenlohr), of Bavaria, tributary of the Hafenlohr
- Steinbach (Kahl), of Bavaria, tributary of the Kahl
- Steinbach (Main), of Bavaria, tributary of the Main
- Steinbach (Paar), of Bavaria, tributary of the Paar
- Steinbach (Reichenbach), of Bavaria, tributary of the Reichenbach
- Steinbach (Saalach), of Bavaria and Austria, tributary of the Saalach

== Schools ==
- In Steinbach, Manitoba, Canada:
  - Steinbach Bible College, an Anabaptist college
  - Steinbach Christian School, an independent day school
  - Steinbach Regional Secondary School

== Sports ==
- TSV Steinbach, from Steinbach, near Haiger, Germany
- Steinbach Black Wings 1992, from Linz, Austria
- Sports teams based in Steinbach, Manitoba, Canada
  - Steinbach Hawks
  - Steinbach Huskies
  - Steinbach North Stars
  - Steinbach Pistons

== See also ==
- Steinbeck (surname)
- Steinbruck
- Steenbeck (surname)
