= Steinbacher =

Steinbacher is a German surname. Notable people with the surname include:

- Arabella Steinbacher (born 1981), German violinist
- Friedrich Steinbacher (1877–1938), German ornithologist and pedagogue
- Georg Steinbacher (1910–1979), German ornithologist and zoo director
- Joachim Steinbacher (1911–2005), German ornithologist
- Hank Steinbacher (1913–1977), American baseball player
- Derek Steinbacher (born 1974), American craniomaxillofacial plastic and rhinoplasty surgeon
