= Steinbruck =

Topics referred to by the same name

Steinbruck, Steinbrück or Steinbrueck may refer to:

== People ==
- Eduard Steinbrück (1802–1882), German painter
- John Steinbruck (1930–2015), American Lutheran minister
- Peer Steinbrück (born 1947), German politician
- Peter Steinbrueck (born 1957), American politician
- Stephan Steinbrück (born 1975), German politician
- Victor Steinbrueck (1911–1985), American architect

== Places ==
- Zidani Most or ("Steinbrück"), settlement in Slovenia
  - Zidani Most railway station
- Zidani Most, Trebnje, a settlement in Slovenia

== See also ==
- The Ehrenfeld Group or Steinbrück Group, a German anti-Nazi resistance group
- O. K. Sato (1871–1921), American vaudeville performer born "Frederick Steinbrucker"
- Steinbeck (disambiguation)
- Steinbach
- Steenbeck (surname)
