= Steinbach (Paar) =

River in Germany

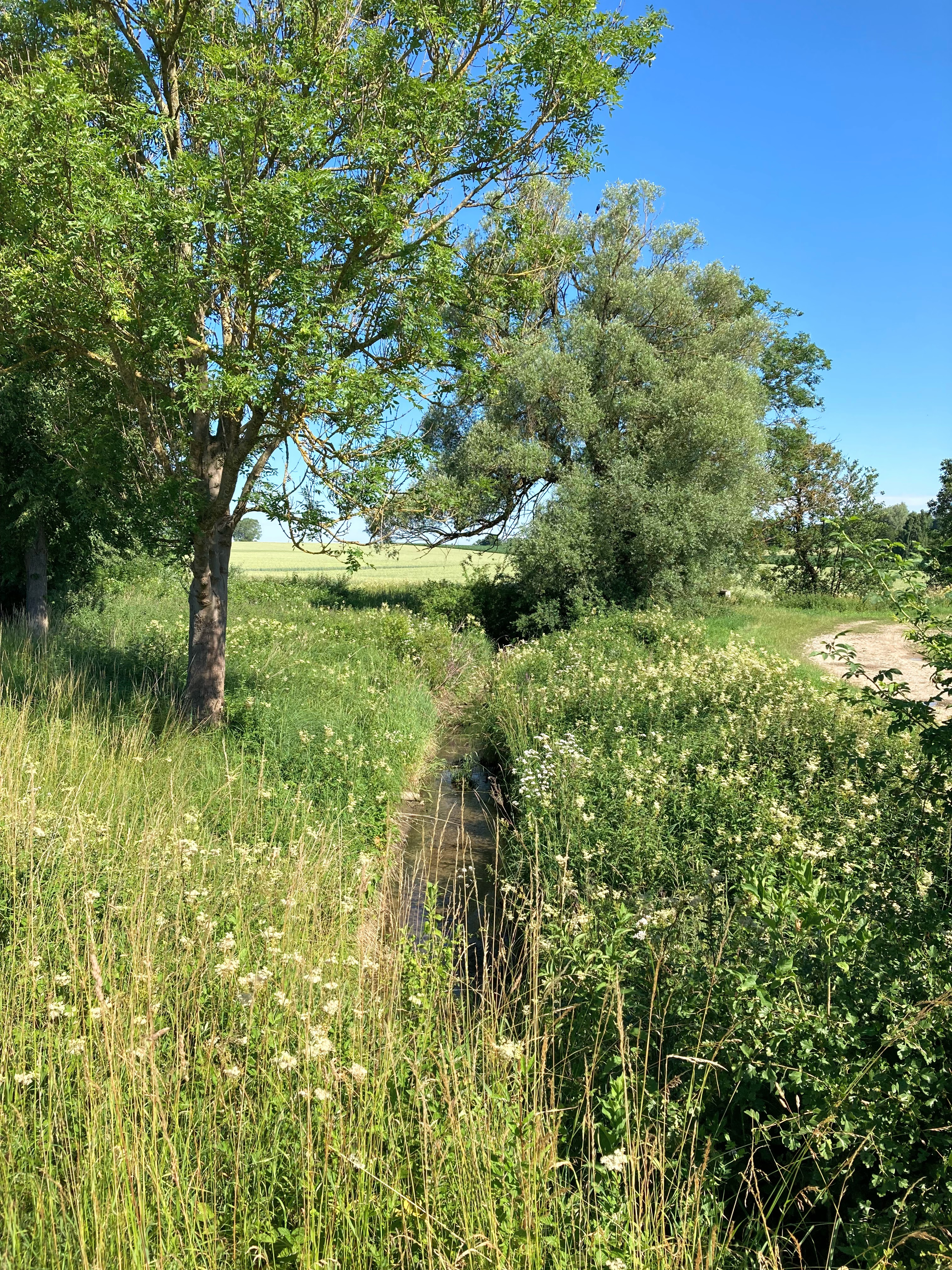
- Steinbach, Bavaria

Location
- Country: Germany
- State: Bavaria

Physical characteristics
- Source
  - location: South of Steinbach, north of Windach, two districts of Moorenweis
  - coordinates: 48.1756°N 11.0524°E
- Mouth
  - location: At Mering into the Paar
  - coordinates: 48.2593°N 10.9904°E

Basin features
- Progression: Paar→ Danube→ Black Sea

Steinbach is a river of Bavaria, Germany.

The Steinbach springs between the two districts Steinbach and Windach of Moorenweis. It is a right tributary of the Paar in Mering.

== See also ==
- List of rivers of Bavaria
