= Margaretha af Ugglas =

Swedish politician (1939–2026)

Minister for Foreign Affairs
- In office 4 October 1991 – 7 October 1994
- Monarch: Carl XVI Gustaf
- Prime Minister: Carl Bildt
- Preceded by: Sten Andersson
- Succeeded by: Lena Hjelm-Wallén

Member of the Swedish Parliament for Moderate Party
- In office 1974–1995

Personal details
- Born: Märta Margaretha Stenbeck; 5 January 1939 Stockholm, Sweden
- Died: 10 May 2026 (aged 87)
- Party: Moderate Party
- Spouse: Bertil af Ugglas (m. 1966; died 1977)
- Parent: Hugo Stenbeck (father)
- Relatives: Jan Stenbeck (brother)
- Education: Stockholm School of Economics; Harvard Business School
- Occupation: Politician

Märta Margaretha baroness af Ugglas (née Stenbeck; 5 January 1939 – 10 May 2026) was a Swedish Moderate Party politician. She was Minister for Foreign Affairs between 1991 and 1994.

== Early life ==
She was the daughter of Hugo Stenbeck, a lawyer and the founder of Investment AB Kinnevik, and his wife Märta (née Odelfeldt). She was the sister of Hugo Jr (1933–1976), Elisabeth Silfverstolpe (1935–1985) and Jan Stenbeck (1942–2002). af Ugglas fought a bitter feud with her brother Jan over the family fortune, and subsequently withdrew from her brother and Kinnevik.

== Career ==
af Ugglas attended the Harvard-Radcliffe Program in Business Administration from 1960 to 1971 and graduated from the Stockholm School of Economics in 1964 with a degree in business administration and economics (Civilekonom). She then worked for Veckans Affärer from 1967 to 1968 and Svenska Dagbladet from 1968 to 1973 as an editorial writer. She was a member of the Stockholm County Council from 1971 to 1973, was publisher of the Svensk tidskrift from 1980 to 1991, and was a member of parliament between 1974 and 1995.

After the election victory in September 1991, Margaretha af Ugglas became Sweden's second female minister for foreign affairs. Her term included the finalization of the negotiations leading up to Sweden's entry into the European Union. In 1992, together with an EU Commissioner and nine other ministers of foreign affairs from the Baltic Sea area, she founded the Council of the Baltic Sea States (CBSS) and the EuroFaculty. af Ugglas served as the Chairperson-in-Office of the OSCE from 1992 to 1993. The Moderate Party lost the 1994 election and she was elected to the European Parliament in 1995. She was vice chairman of the European People's Party from 1996.

She was a member of the Committee on Foreign Affairs, a board member of the Swedish International Development Cooperation Agency (SIDA) and a delegate of the Council of Europe. Furthermore, af Ugglas was board member of the Bulten-Kanthal AB, Investment AB Kinnevik Boliden AB, Swedish Match AB and Stora Kopparbergs Bergslags AB. She was chairman of the Save the Children's Stockholm Association, the Swedish Women's Voluntary Defence Organization and the Jarl Hjalmarson Foundation from 2002 to 2010.

== Personal life ==
In 1966 she married baron Bertil af Ugglas (1934–1977), the son of Commander baron Oscar af Ugglas and Ingeborg (née countess Lewenhaupt).

She died on 10 May 2026, aged 87.

== Awards and decorations ==
- (Estonia) 1st Class of the Order of the Cross of Terra Mariana (9 February 2000)

Political offices
Preceded by Sten Andersson	Minister for Foreign Affairs; 1991–1994	Succeeded by Lena Hjelm-Wallén
Diplomatic posts
Preceded by Jozef Moravčík; Czechoslovakia	Chairperson-in-Office of the OSCE; 1993	Succeeded by Beniamino Andreatta; Italy
