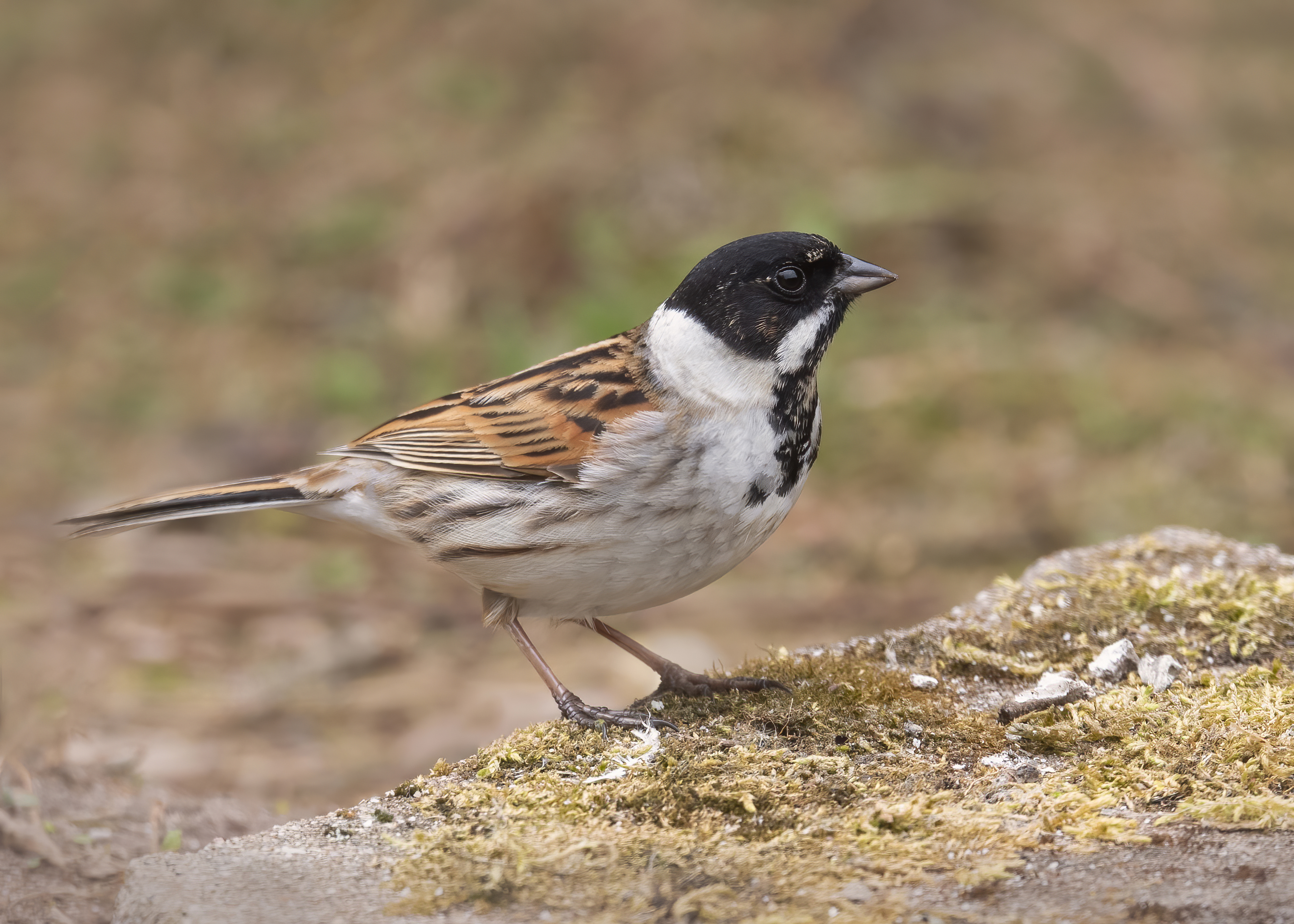
- Male at Dumfries and Galloway, Scotland
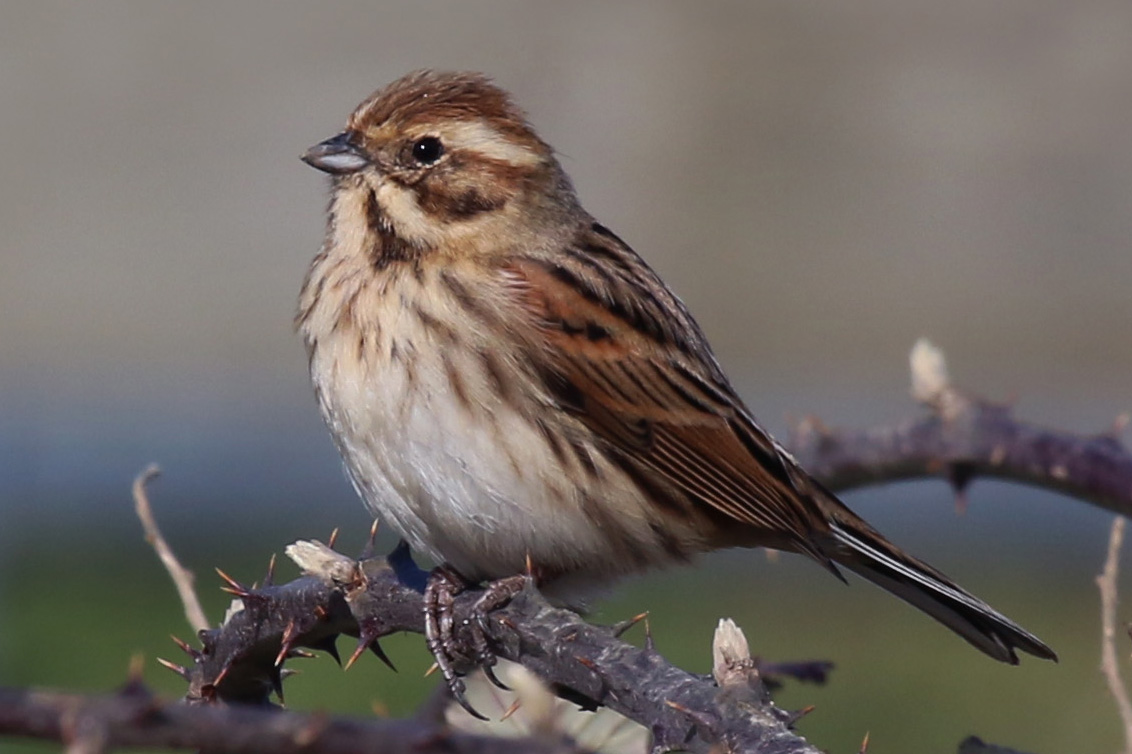
- Female at Otmoor, Oxfordshire Male bird recorded in Norfolk, England

Conservation status
- Least Concern (IUCN 3.1)

Scientific classification
- Kingdom: Animalia
- Phylum: Chordata
- Class: Aves
- Order: Passeriformes
- Family: Emberizidae
- Genus: Schoeniclus
- Species: S. schoeniclus

Binomial name
- Schoeniclus schoeniclus (Linnaeus, 1758)

Subspecies
- see text
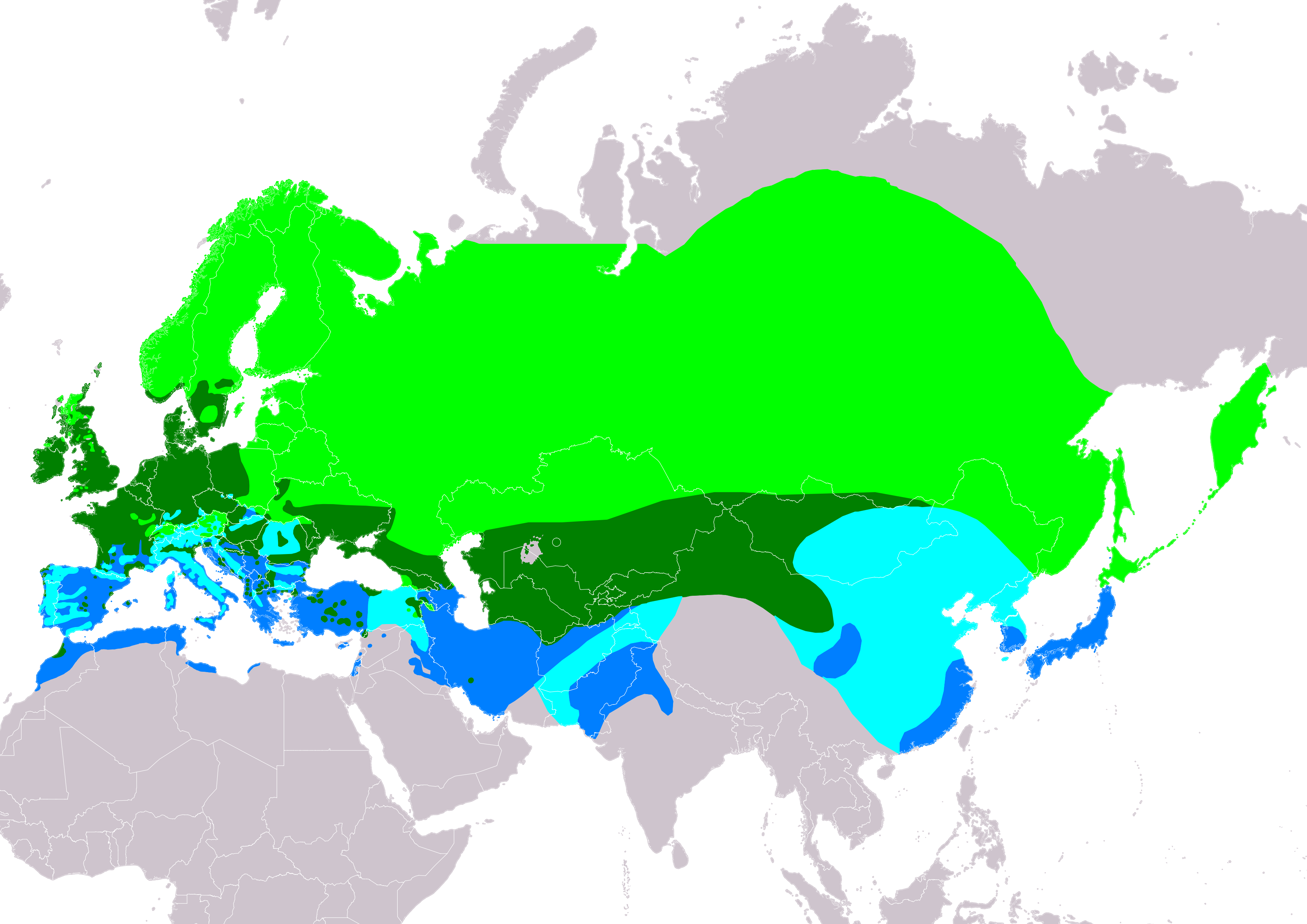
- Range of S. schoeniclus Breeding Resident Passage Non-breeding

Synonyms
- Fringilla schoeniclus Linnaeus, 1758; Emberiza schoeniclus (Linnaeus, 1758)

= Common reed bunting =

Common reed bunting Temporal range: Chibanian–present (Note: Fossil remains are known from between 130 and 10 thousand years ago.)

Species of bird

The common reed bunting (Schoeniclus schoeniclus), or simply reed bunting, is a passerine bird in the family Emberizidae. This species breeds throughout Europe and much of the Palearctic region. While most individuals migrate south in winter, those in the milder south and west of the range are resident. It is a common sight in reedbeds, but also breeds in drier open areas such as moorland and arable land. For example, it inhabits purple moor grass and rush pastures, which are designated as a Biodiversity Action Plan habitat in the UK. It occurs on poorly drained neutral and acid soils of the lowlands and upland fringe.

== Taxonomy ==
The common reed bunting was described by the Swedish naturalist Carl Linnaeus in 1758 in the tenth edition of his Systema Naturae under the binomial name Fringilla schoeniclus. This species was formerly placed in the genus Emberiza but in 2026 it was moved to the resurrected genus Schoeniclus based on the results of a 2021 molecular genetic study. The genus and species name Schoeniclus is from Ancient Greek σχοινικλος/skhoiniklos, a word that was used by Greek authors for an unidentified waterside bird. Linnaeus specified the type locality as Europe but this is now restricted to Sweden. Within its genus, the common reed bunting is most closely related to the ochre-rumped bunting and Pallas's reed bunting.

Nineteen subspecies are recognised:

- S. s. lusitanicus (Steinbacher, 1930) – Portugal and northwestern Spain
- S. s. schoeniclus (Linnaeus, 1758) – breeds British Isles and northwestern Europe to central Russia; winters to North Africa
- S. s. passerinus (Pallas, 1771) – breeds northwestern Siberia from lower Ob River eastward to lower Yenisey and Khatanga rivers (in Taymyr); winters sparingly to northernmost India and western China
- S. s. parvirostris (Buturlin, 1910) – breeds central Siberia and northern Mongolia; winters to northern China
- S. s. pyrrhulinus Swinhoe, 1876 – breeds Transbaikal to Kamchatka Peninsula, Kuril Islands, Sakhalin, Hokkaido, and northern Honshu
- S. s. pallidior (Hartert, 1904) – breeds southwestern Siberia eastward to Lake Baikal; winters in southwestern and south-central Asia
- S. s. stresemanni (Steinbacher, 1930) – eastern Austria, Hungary, northern Serbia, and northwestern Romania
- S. s. ukrainae (Zarudny, 1917) – breeds southwestern Russia to northern Ukraine and Volga River; winters to Caucasus
- S. s. incognitus (Zarudny, 1917) – breeds Russia east of Volga to southern Urals and northern Kazakhstan; winters to northwestern China
- S. s. witherbyi (Jordans, 1923) – southern Portugal, coastal eastern Spain (including the Balearic Islands), Mediterranean coast of France, Sardinia, and northwestern Morocco
- S. s. intermedius (Degland, 1849) – Italy (including Sicily) eastward to northwestern Albania
- S. s. tschusii (Reiser & Almásy, 1898) – Bulgaria and Romania eastward to the Sea of Azov
- S. s. reiseri (Hartert, 1904) – northern Greece, Albania, Macedonia, and western and central Turkey
- S. s. caspius (Ménétries, 1832) – eastern Turkey eastward to eastern Transcaucasia and northern and northwestern Iran
- S. s. korejewi (Zarudny, 1907) – southern Turkmenistan and southwestern and eastern Iran
- S. s. pyrrhuloides (Pallas, 1811) – northern Caspian Sea region eastward to southeastern Kazakhstan
- S. s. harterti (Sushkin, 1906) – far southern Russia, far eastern Kazakhstan, northwestern China and western and central Mongolia
- S. s. centralasiae (Hartert, 1904) – western China
- S. s. zaidamensis (Portenko, 1929) – western China (Qaidam Basin in northern Qinghai)

== Description ==
The common reed bunting is a medium-sized bird, 13.5–15.5 cm (5.3–6.1 in) long and weighing 10–28 g, with a small but powerful seed-eating bill. The male has a black head and throat, white neck collar and underparts, and a heavily barred brown back. The female is much duller, with a streaked brown head, and more barring underneath. The male's song is a repetitive srip.

== Behaviour ==
Its natural diet consists of insects when feeding its young, and seeds at other times.

=== Breeding ===
Breeding usually begins in early April and ends in late August, depending on the location and altitude. The species is monogamous. The nest, which is made of twigs, grass and reeds, is lined with finer materials such as hair, moss and rootlets, and is located in a bush or reed tussock. Four to five olive-grey eggs are laid, displaying the distinctive hair-like markings characteristic of those of buntings. The incubation period is 12–15 days, during which both parents feed the chicks.

== Status ==
The reed bunting is not globally threatened and is listed as least concern by the IUCN. The estimated European population is at least 4.8 million pairs, with particular strongholds in Sweden, Poland and Norway. However, the reed bunting is reported to be declining in Norway, Sweden, Denmark and Germany.

== Gallery ==
Schoeniclus schoeniclus

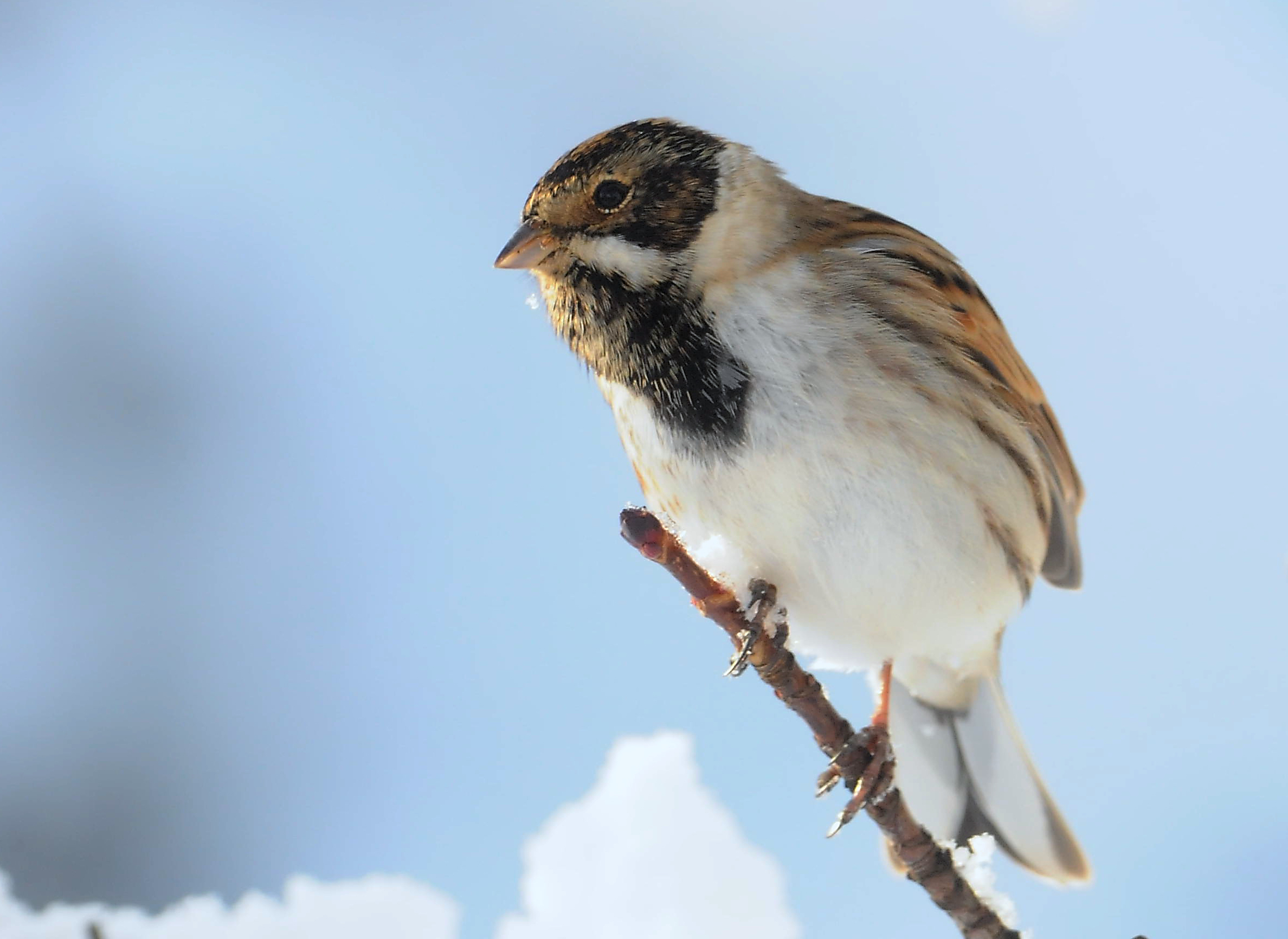
A male in winter in England

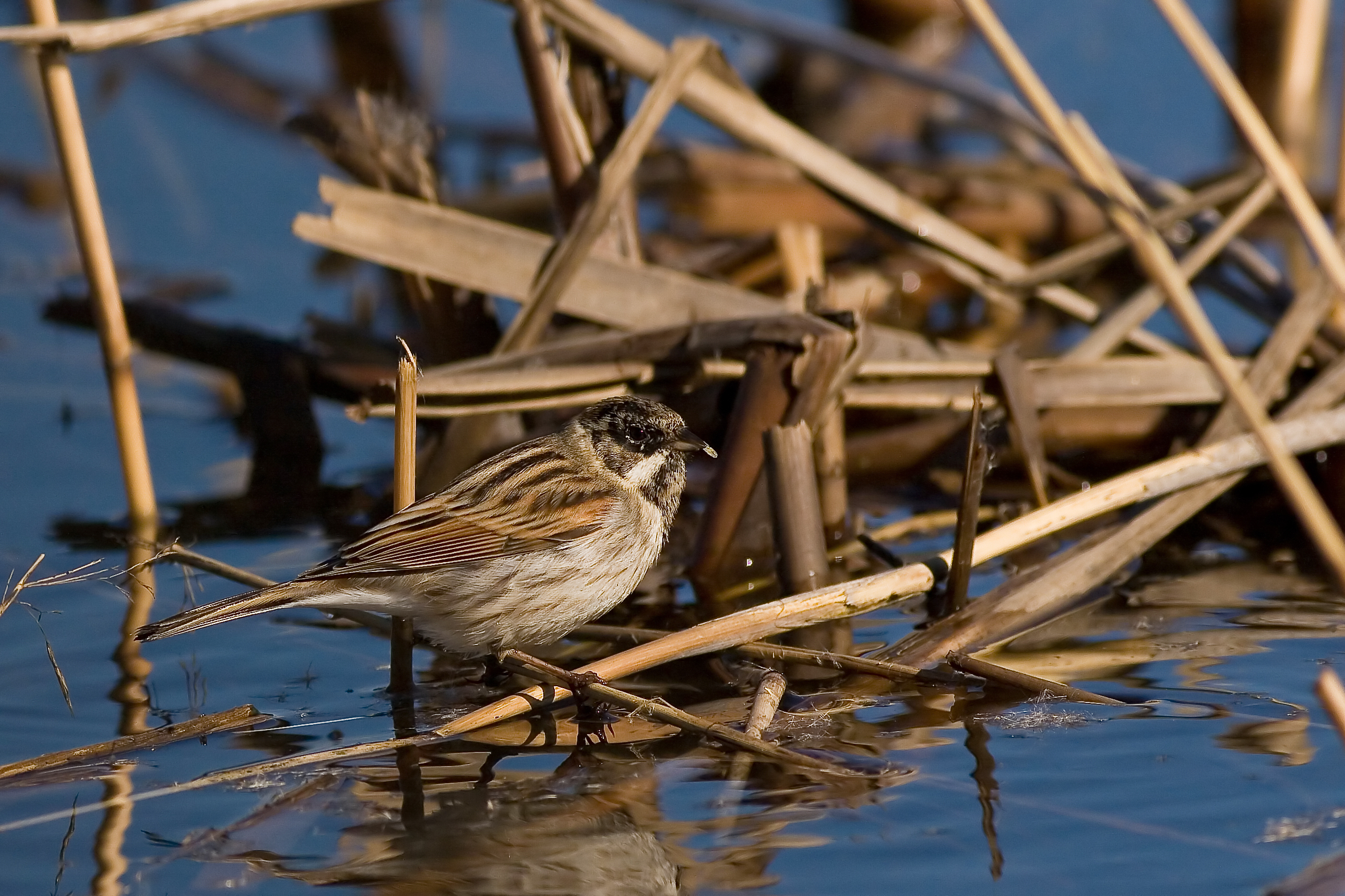
In natural shore habitat

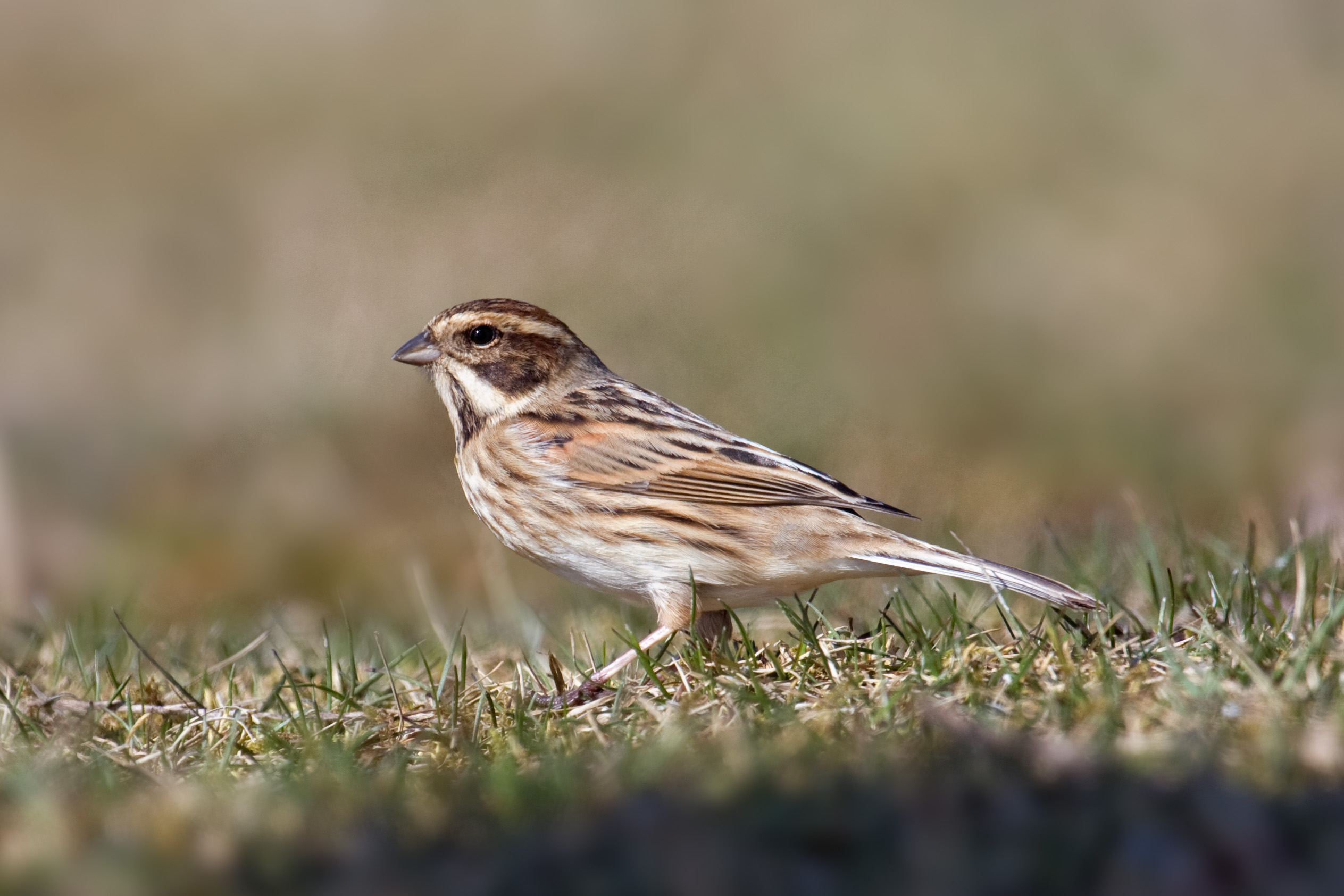
Female

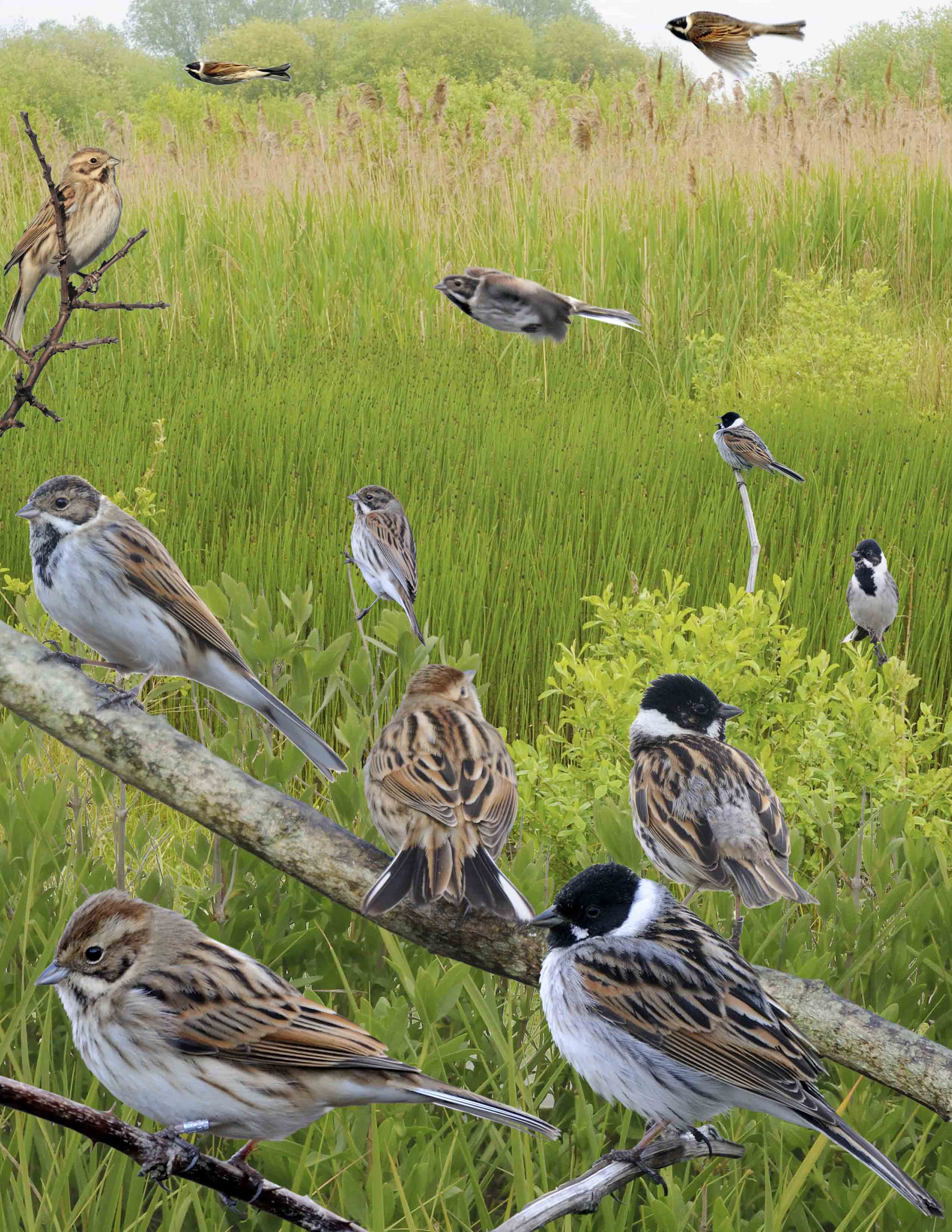
ID composite

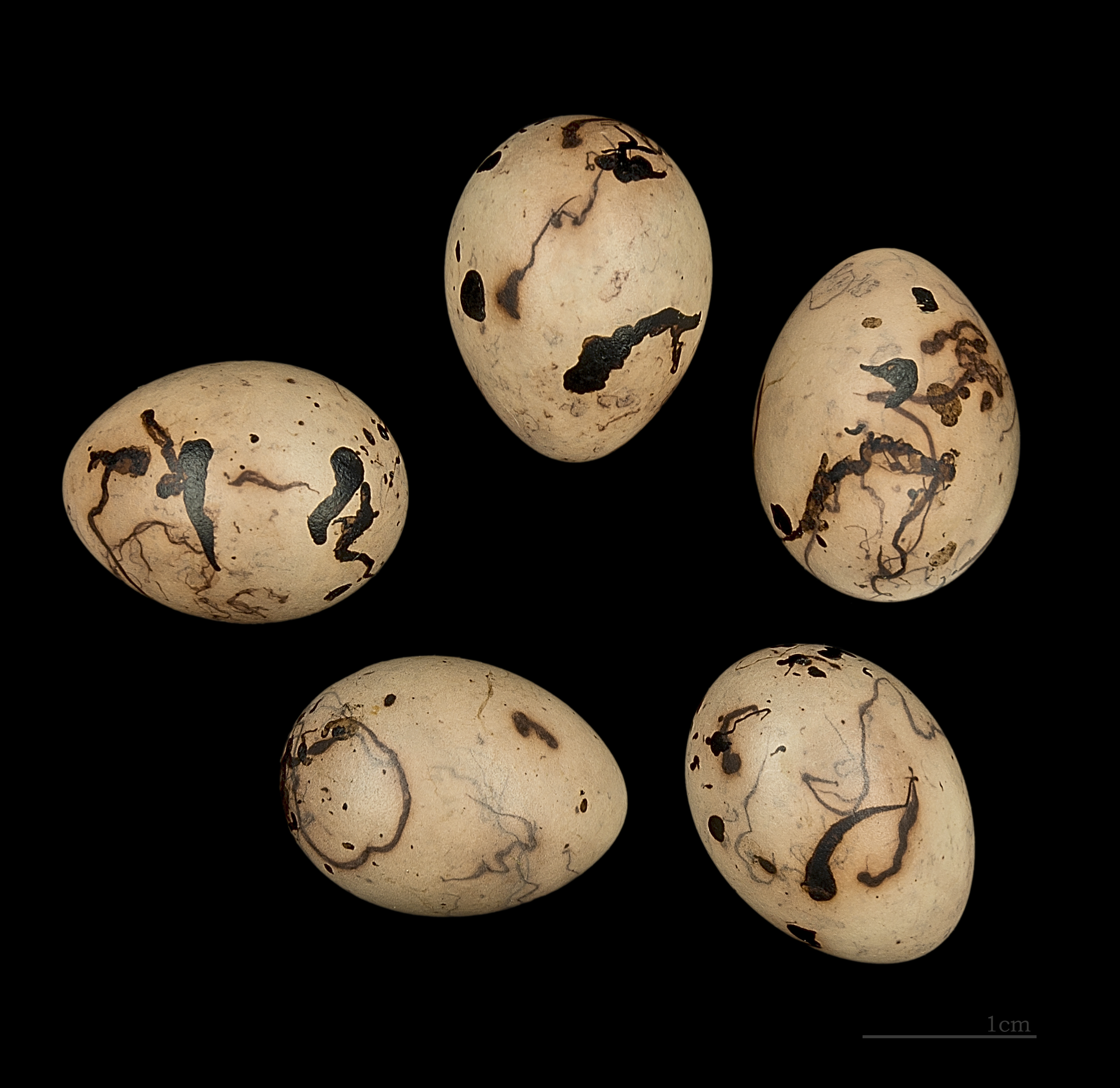
Eggs

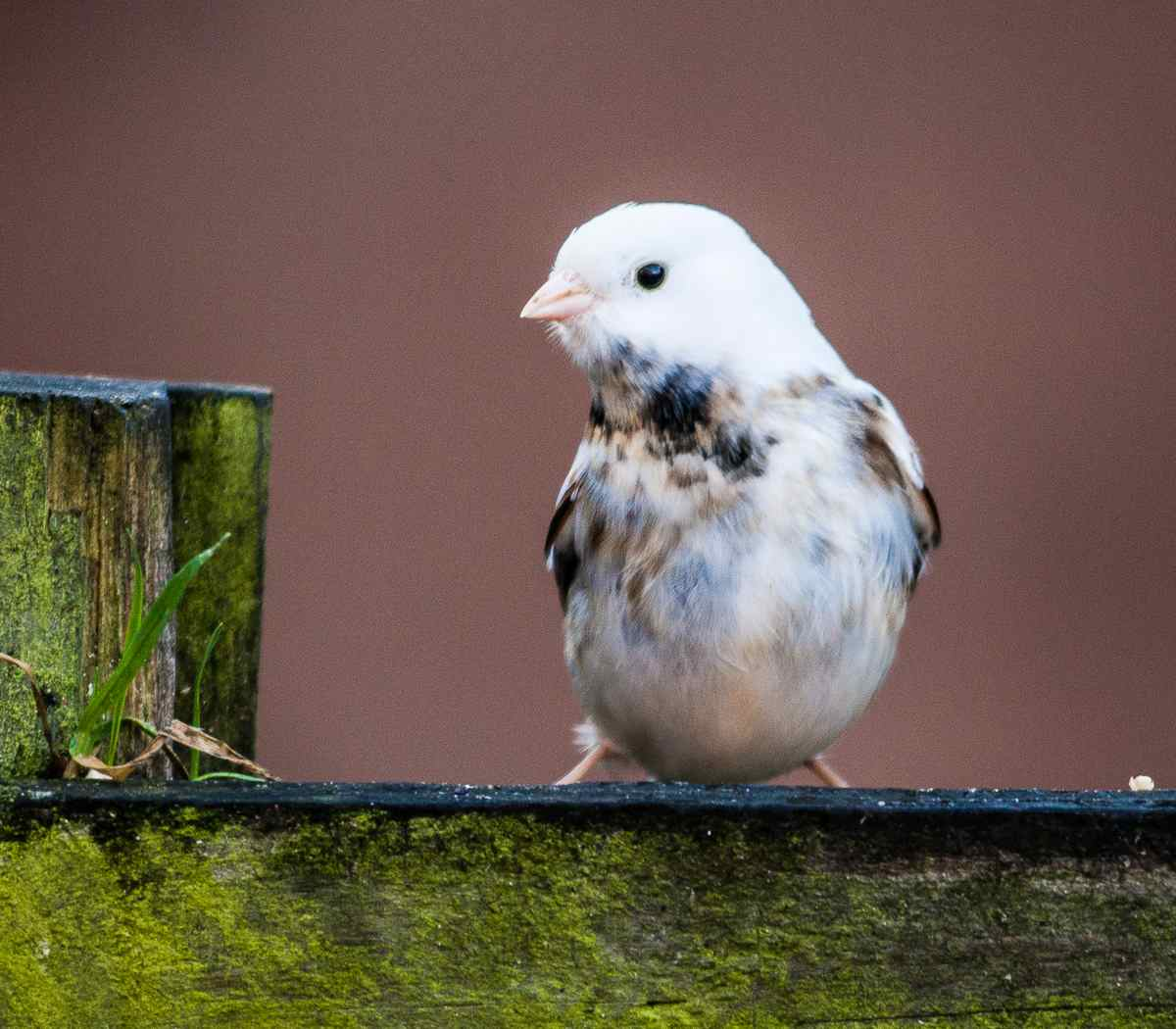
Leucistic reed bunting

Media related to Emberiza schoeniclus at Wikimedia Commons
