= Cristina Stenbeck =

American businesswoman (born 1977)

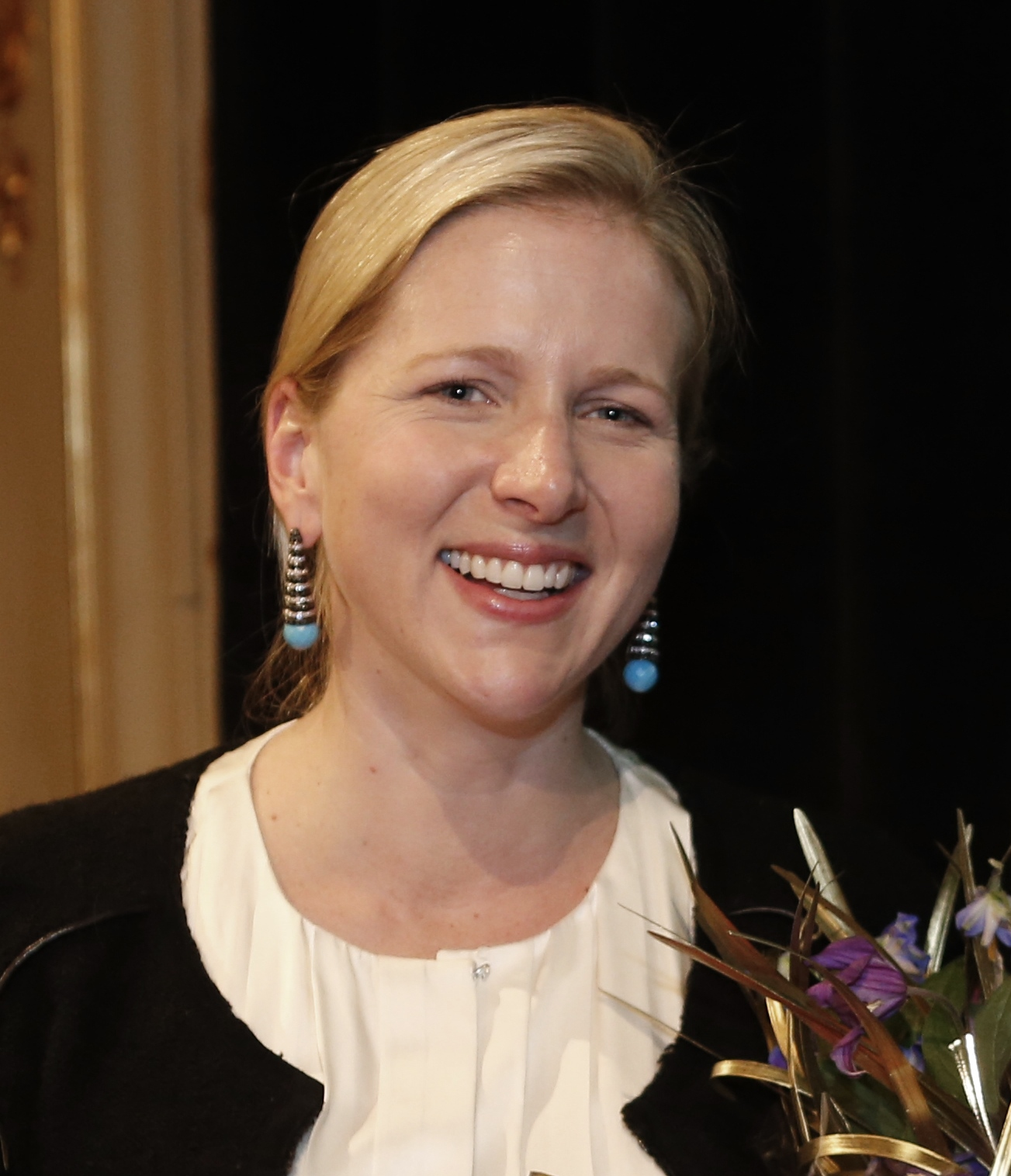
- Born: 27 September 1977 (age 49); New York City, United States
- Occupation: Investor
- Spouse: Alexander Fitzgibbons
- Children: 5
- Parent(s): Jan Stenbeck; Merrill MacLeod Stenbeck

Cristina Mayville Stenbeck (born 27 September 1977) is a Swedish businesswoman. She is a major shareholder and former executive chairman of Kinnevik AB, one of the largest investment companies in Sweden.

== Early life ==
Stenbeck was born in New York City as the eldest daughter of Jan Stenbeck, a Swedish industrialist, and Merrill MacLeod Stenbeck, an American. Her siblings include Max Stenbeck. Stenbeck is the granddaughter of Hugo Stenbeck, a Swedish industrialist who co-founded the family company, Kinnevik AB.

Stenbeck attended St. Andrew's School in Delaware, where she was later a trustee, and graduated from Georgetown University in Washington, D.C., with a Bachelor of Science in 2000.

== Career ==
In 1997 she joined the board of Invik & Co, a financial services company supporting the insurance, fund management and banking industry. Stenbeck became the vice chairman of Kinnevik AB in 2003 and became chairman in 2007. In 2016 she stepped down as chairman of Kinnevik to concentrate on investing.

For a decade after 2003 Stenbeck worked at Kinnevik AB, consolidating the ownership and simplifying the corporate structure. She also divested peripheral businesses in order to reduce leverage and increase transparency of the company.

In early 2014 she became chairman of the board at the online fashion retail platform Zalando. She also joined the board of Spotify. She served as the chairperson on the Board of Zalando (2019–2023) and as a non-executive director on the Board of Spotify for 6 years (2017–2023).

== Awards ==
In April 2012 Stenbeck was awarded the Swedish Royal Patriotic Society Business Medal for outstanding entrepreneurship, and in November 2012 she won the Golden Gavel for her leadership as chairman of a listed company.

== Personal life ==
Stenbeck married the English businessman Alexander Fitzgibbons in September 2005. She has five children. She was named 2016 European Manager of the Year by the European Business Press (EBP).
