= Steinbok =

Steinbok may refer to:

- Steenbok or steinbok, a small antelope of southern and eastern Africa
- Steinbok Peak, a mountain near Hope, British Columbia, Canada
- Steinbok, the name given to the first LNER Thompson Class B1 steam locomotive

== See also ==
- Steinbock (disambiguation)
