= Gee Broadcast =

Broadcasting technology company

Gee Broadcast Systems Ltd was founded in the UK in early 1987 by Keith and Sarah Gee. The company was initially set up to provide a design and installation service for broadcast television systems but expanded to equipment sales and distribution, including videographics and "engineering" products. Later the 'Geevs' (Gee Video Server) family of video servers was developed and led to growth particularly in exports. Exports of Geevs reached over 50 countries and formed the largest part of the Gee Broadcast business.

== History ==
In 2004, Gee Broadcast acquired Lightworks in order to provide a tapeless production system with multichannel servers and editing systems.

In 2007, Gee Broadcast Systems with Lightworks had a team of engineers based in Basingstoke, Hampshire, with 5,000 sq ft (460 m^{2}) of office and workshop space, flexibly configured to allow the manufacturing and testing of large and small Geevs and Lightworks systems, together with a range of distributed products.

In September 2009, Gee Broadcast Systems Ltd went into administration, and was dissolved in November 2010. Prior to this, certain assets of the company were acquired by EditShare.

== Products ==
=== Geevs server systems ===
Geevs Servers could be built to meet the requirements of many different applications. Geevs could provide system design and consultancy or work with other system integrators for specific requirements.

=== Lightworks Editors ===
Lightworks Editors are used in many different areas including feature films, TV drama, soaps, commercials and sports. Lightworks is known for its console and user interface which together provide editing.

=== Tapeless production systems ===
Gee Broadcast Tapeless Production Systems were configured to match specific customers needs included Geevs servers and Lightworks Editors.
