= Stenbäck =

Stenbäck is a surname. Notable people with the surname include:

- Josef Stenbäck (1854—1929), Finnish church architect and engineer
- Pär Stenbäck (born 1941), Finnish politician
- Helena Stenbäck (born 1979), Swedish beauty pageant contestant
- Johnny Stenbäck, Finnish software developer

== See also ==
- Stenbeck
