= Kinnevik AB =

Swedish investment company

- Type: Aktiebolag
- Traded as: Nasdaq Stockholm: KINV B
- ISIN: SE0014684510; SE0014684528
- Industry: Investment
- Founded: 1936; 90 years ago
- Founders: Hugo Stenbeck; Wilhelm Klingspor; Robert von Horn
- Headquarters: Stockholm, Sweden
- Key people: James Anderson (Chairman); Georgi Ganev (CEO); Samuel Sjöström; CFO)
- Website: www.kinnevik.com

Kinnevik AB (Swedish pronunciation: [ˈɕɪ̂nːɛˌviːk]) is a Swedish investment company that was founded in 1936 by the Stenbeck, Klingspor and von Horn families.

Kinnevik is an active and long-term owner investing primarily in digital consumer businesses. Current CEO, Georgi Ganev, was appointed in 2018.

Kinnevik holds stakes in over 35 companies and invests across Europe and in the US. Kinnevik has four focus sectors: healthcare (value-based and virtual care), software, marketplaces and climate tech. The largest holding is Tele2.

== History ==
Kinnevik was founded as an investment company in 1936 by Robert von Horn, Wilhelm Klingspor and Hugo Stenbeck. The most important holdings when the company started were Mellersta Sveriges Lantbruks AB, Lidköpings Konfektyr Industri AB and Korsnäs Sågverks AB. The company grew quickly through share purchases and acquisitions of companies that included chocolate manufacturers Nordiska Suchard and Halmstads Järnverk.

The company's aggressive acquisition strategy of Swedish industrial companies continued during Kinnevik's first decades. The ownership structure of the investment company changed as Hugo Stenbeck gradually increased his holdings.

Kinnevik became a listed company and obtained additional capital in a new share issue in 1954. The first shares in Sandvikens Järnverk were purchased a few years after entering the stock market.

Hugo Stenbeck replaced Wilhelm Klingspor as chairman of Kinnevik in the early 1960s. Shortly thereafter, Hugo Stenbeck's oldest son, Hugo Stenbeck Jr, became managing director of the company.

Hugo Stenbeck Jr died in 1976 and his younger brother, Jan Hugo Stenbeck, joined Kinnevik's management team. Hugo Stenbeck Sr died in 1977.

The shareholding in Sandvik AB increased steadily during the late 1970s, while Kinnevik increased its position in Fagersta AB. A major holding in the insurance company Atlantica was acquired in 1978. Several auto companies were acquired in 1980 and were gathered under the name Svenska Motor AB. This included the import and sales of Toyota vehicles.

In the early 1980s, Comvik AB launched a new mobile telephony system and, after a number of legal battles with state-owned Televerket, gained a favourable ruling by The Supreme Administrative Court. In 1985, a satellite system for television distribution was completed and during the late 1980s the battle intensified with the state-owned monopolies in telecommunications, television and radio. TV3 sent its premier broadcast from London on New Year's Eve 1987. Comvik obtained authorisation to start a new mobile telephony network in 1989. Millicom International Cellular was formed the following year.

The first Kinnevik-run radio broadcasts began in 1991. During the same year, Kinnevik became the largest owner in newly established TV4 with a 20 percent shareholding. The free newspaper Metro International was launched in 1995 and the concept later spread rapidly throughout the world.

Tele2 was founded in 1993 and listed on the Stockholm stock exchange in 1996.

In 1995, MTG was incorporated as a subsidiary of Kinnevik, having previously been a business area (Kinnevik TV & Media). MTG was spun-off to shareholders in 1997 and listed in Stockholm and New York.

Jan Hugo Stenbeck died on 19 August 2002 and was replaced by Edvard von Horn as chairman. Pehr G. Gyllenhammar became chairman in 2004 and was replaced three years later by Cristina Stenbeck. In March 2016, Cristina Stenbeck announced her intention to step down as Chairman of Kinnevik and was replaced at the 2016 AGM by Tom Boardman. Cristina Stenbeck remains a board director of Kinnevik.

Between 2005 and 2010, there was a major shift in the shareholdings in which ownership in Millicom increased and forestry shares decreased. At this time, the foundation was laid for investments in a number of internet businesses, particularly e-commerce companies. This profile was strengthened after 2010 with major investments in Rocket Internet, Zalando, Avito and Global Fashion Group, among others.

In 2013, Kinnevik sold all its remaining shares in BillerudKorsnäs. Zalando and Rocket Internet, two Kinnevik-backed companies, made their Initial Public Offerings (IPOs) on the Frankfurt Stock Exchange in 2014. In October 2015, Avito was sold to the South African media conglomerate Naspers. In 2017, Kinnevik sold its remaining shareholding in Rocket Internet.

== Kinnevik today ==
Georgi Ganev was appointed CEO of Kinnevik in January 2018. James Anderson was appointed Chairman of Kinnevik at the Annual General Meeting 2021.

In 2018 Kinnevik expressed its support for the merger between Tele2 and Com Hem, later the same year Kinnevik also distributed its shares in MTG to its shareholders. In 2018 Kinnevik also increased its investment in Livongo and invested in Kolonial.no, Karma, BudBee, Pleo, Deposit Solutions, Cedar and Monese.

In 2019 Kinnevik distributed its remaining shareholding in Millicom to its shareholders.

In 2021 Kinnevik distributed its Zalando shareholding to shareholders to balance a larger share of its portfolio towards its "younger, disruptive and technology-enabled" growth and venture capital businesses.

In 2023, Kinnevik exited its remaining shareholding in Teladoc.

== Significant holdings ==
Per 31 March 2023, Kinnevik's Net Asset Value amounted to SEK 55.5 billion. The largest holdings are (value corresponds to Kinnevik's ownership in SEK billions):

| Company | Value in billions (SEK) |
|---|---|
| Tele2 | 14 |
| VillageMD | 5 |
| Pleo | 3 |
| Cityblock | 3 |

== Shareholders ==
Per 5 May 2023, by votes.

| Company | Percent of capital | Percent of votes |
|---|---|---|
| Verdere S.À.R.L. | 4.07 | 19.1 |
| Alces Maximus LLC | 2.42 | 11.57 |
| CMS Sapere Aude Trust | 1.39 | 6.64 |
| Wilhelm, Marie & Amelie Klingspor | 1.64 | 6.13 |
| Baillie Gifford & Co | 11.42 | 5.48 |
| Spiltan Funds | 6.49 | 3.11 |
| AMF Pension & Funds | 2.42 | 5.04 |
