= Steenbeck =

Flatbed film editor manufacturer

- Founded: 1931
- Founder: Wilhelm Steenbeck
- Headquarters: Netherlands
- Products: Flatbed editors
- Website: steenbeck.com

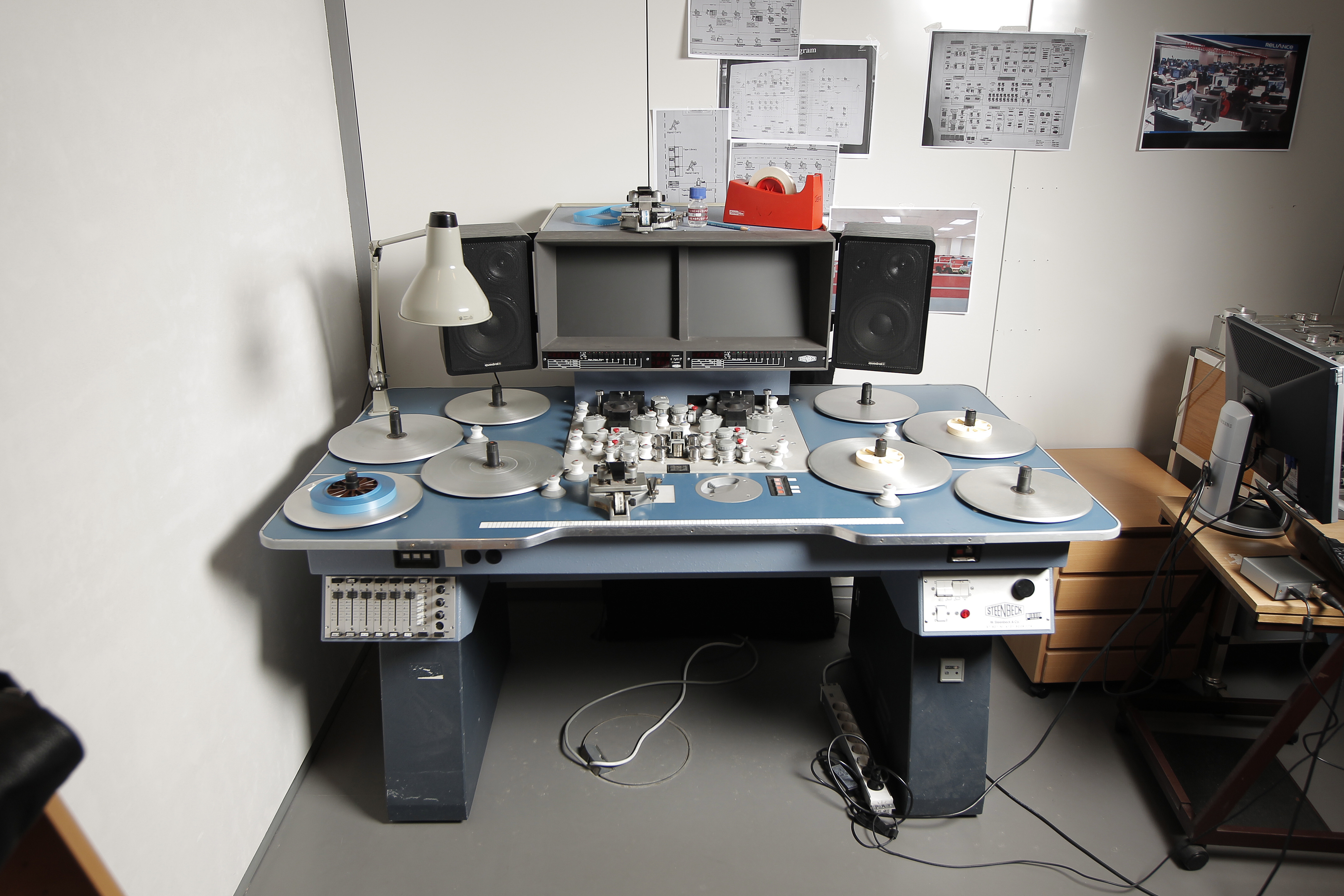
Steenbeck 16mm flatbed ST 921

Steenbeck was a company that manufactured flatbed editors. Steenbeck is a brand name that has become synonymous with a type of flatbed film editing suite which is usable with both 16 mm and 35 mm optical sound and magnetic sound film.

The Steenbeck company was founded in 1931 by Wilhelm Steenbeck in Hamburg, Germany. Since then, Steenbeck editing tables have become ubiquitous in the film editing community and have seen significant use in television production. In total, more than 25,000 machines are in operation around the world. The company relocated to Venray, Netherlands, in September 2003, and went out of business in 2024.https://www.faillissementsdossier.nl/en/bankruptcy/1841457/steenbeck-b-v.aspx

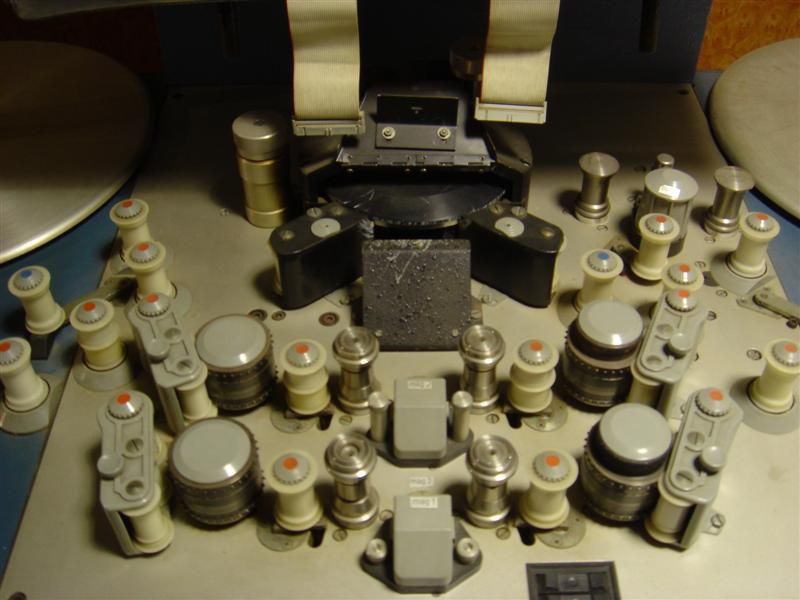
Steenbeck film editing machine rollers

Despite the move away from physical film stock – much editing is now based on digital media – devices such as the Lightworks non-linear film editing controller and archives still use the Steenbeck for controlling the process. The Steenbeck's lower light levels and controllable speed make it a preferred piece of equipment for film archives (such as the Library of Congress's motion picture collection) and restoration facilities as prints can be quickly and easily inspected with less risk of damage compared with a movie projector. Because there is no intermittent movement, the image is created through a rotating prism which scans the frames. Steenbeck machines were known to be exceptionally easy on film stock, due to their use of soft-edged nylon rollers.
