= Wilhelm Steenbeck =

- Born: February 25, 1896; Hamburg
- Died: March 24, 1975 (aged 79); Hamburg
- Occupations: Engineer, Businessman, inventor
- Known for: Steenback company

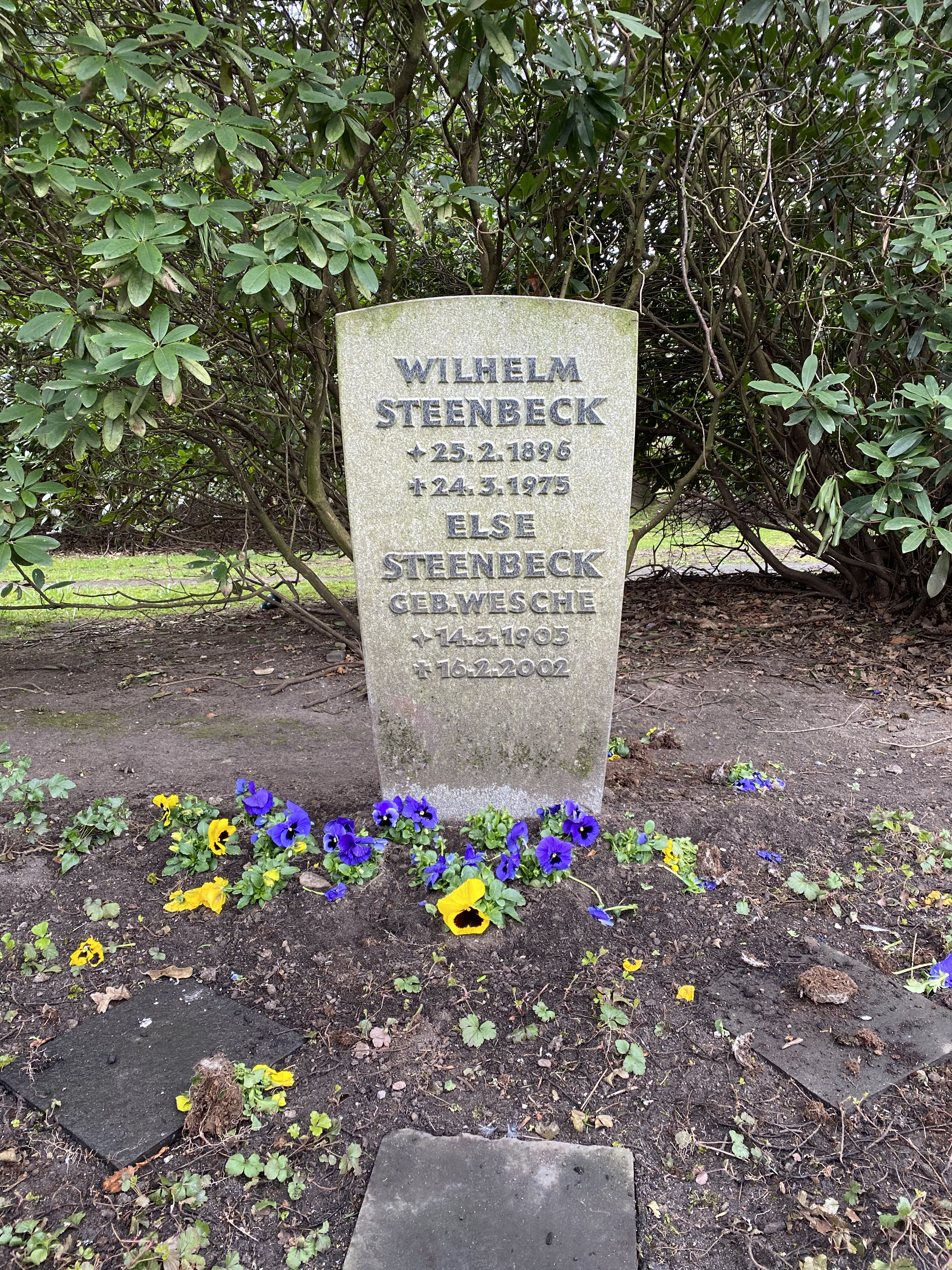
Grave, Ohlsdorf Cemetery

Wilhelm Steenbeck (1896–1975) was a German engineer, who invented the editing system known as Steenbeck, which is a brand name that has become synonymous with a type of flatbed editor system. He founded The Steenbeck company in 1931 in Hamburg.
