= Cheng's jird =

Conservation status
- Least Concern (IUCN 3.1)

Scientific classification
- Kingdom: Animalia
- Phylum: Chordata
- Class: Mammalia
- Order: Rodentia
- Family: Muridae
- Genus: Meriones
- Species: M. chengi

Binomial name
- Meriones chengi Wang, 1964

Species of rodent

Cheng's jird (Meriones chengi) is a species of rodent in the family Muridae. It was named in honour of the Chinese zoologist Professor Tso-hsin Cheng. It is found only in the Turpan Depression of eastern Xinjiang, China.
