= Flatbed editor =

Film editing machine

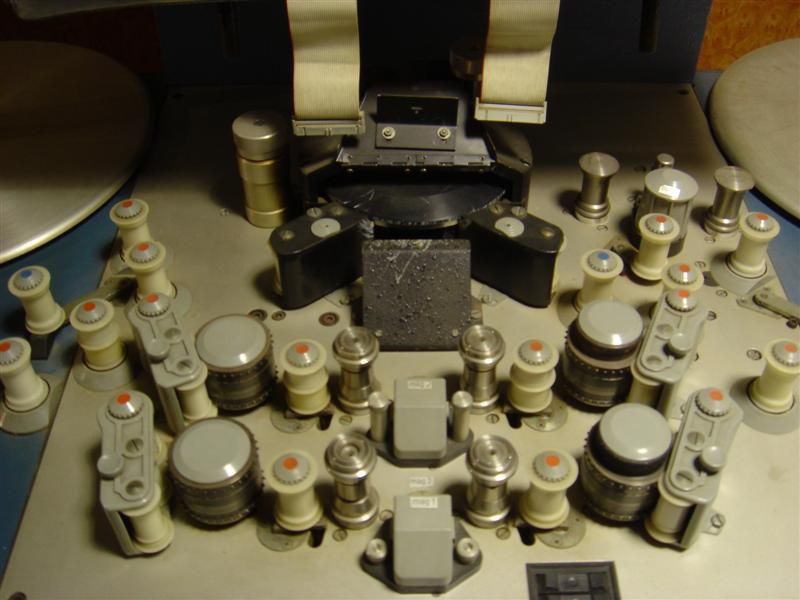
The rollers on a Steenbeck flatbed editor.

A flatbed editor is a type of machine used to edit film for a motion picture.

Picture and sound rolls are placed onto separate motorized disks, called "plates," and then threaded through picture and sound transports, each of which has sprocket rollers that transport the film or magnetic stock forwards or backwards at variable or fixed speeds while maintaining their precise positions. The transports can be "locked" together, either mechanically (KEM, Steenbeck, Showchron) or electronically (Moviola), so that they move in harmony and maintain synchronization between picture and sound. They can also be unlocked to move them independently. A prism reflects the film image onto a viewing screen, while a magnetic playback head reads the magnetic audio tracks. The two most common configurations are the "six-plate" (one picture transport and two sound transports) and the "eight-plate" (two picture and two sound transport) models. (The edges of two of the plates on the six-plate model can be seen pictured at the right.)

== Process ==
=== Preparation ===
Most films are shot double-system: The picture is shot on film, while the sound is recorded separately on a quarter-inch audiotape on a Nagra III, 4.2, 4S or occasionally a Stellavox SP7. For convenience during the editing process, the sound is transferred to a magnetic track ("mag") — sprocketed recording film, which is filmstock coated with magnetic oxide, instead of photo-sensitive emulsion. One "frame" on the magnetic film equals one frame of picture. The magnetic film is usually edge-coded: sequential numbers are stamped on the edge every few frames to facilitate locating particular frames or scenes.

=== Synchronizing ===
Since picture and sound are usually recorded separately, the editor must synchronize them. The editor loads one picture roll onto a film plate and its corresponding magnetic roll onto a sound plate. Then they advance the film to find the frame where the two parts of the Clapperboard came together. The editor repeats the process on the magnetic roll to find the frame with the clap sound. Once found, they mark the frame on both rolls as the synchronization point and switches the flatbed to interlock mode. From then on, both picture and sound rolls advance or reverse by exactly the same amount to maintain synchronization.

=== Editing ===
When the editor finds a point to edit the picture and/or sound, they mark the frame with a grease pencil, make a cut, and add, remove, or rearrange shots or sections and then rejoin them with splice tape.

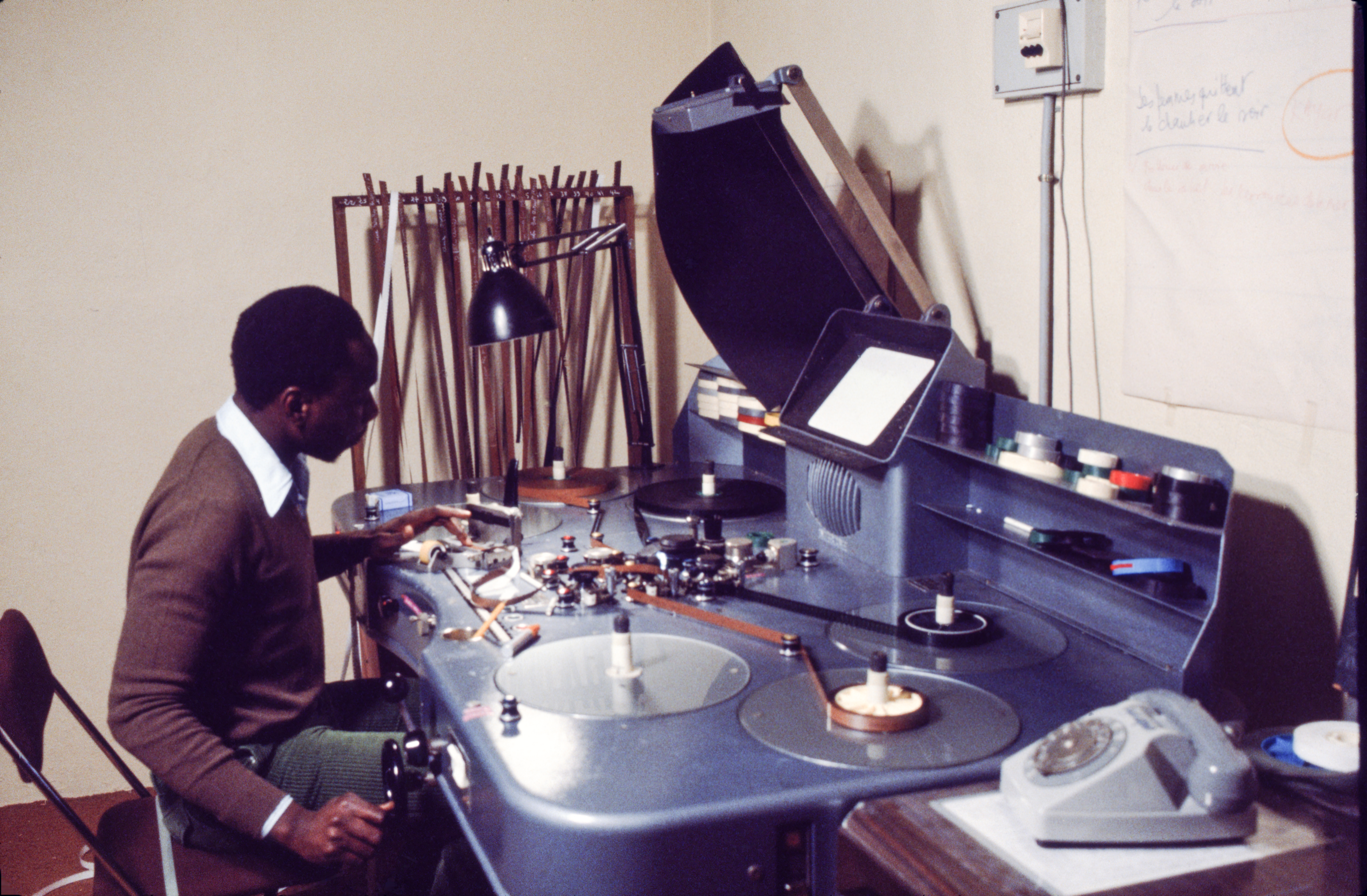

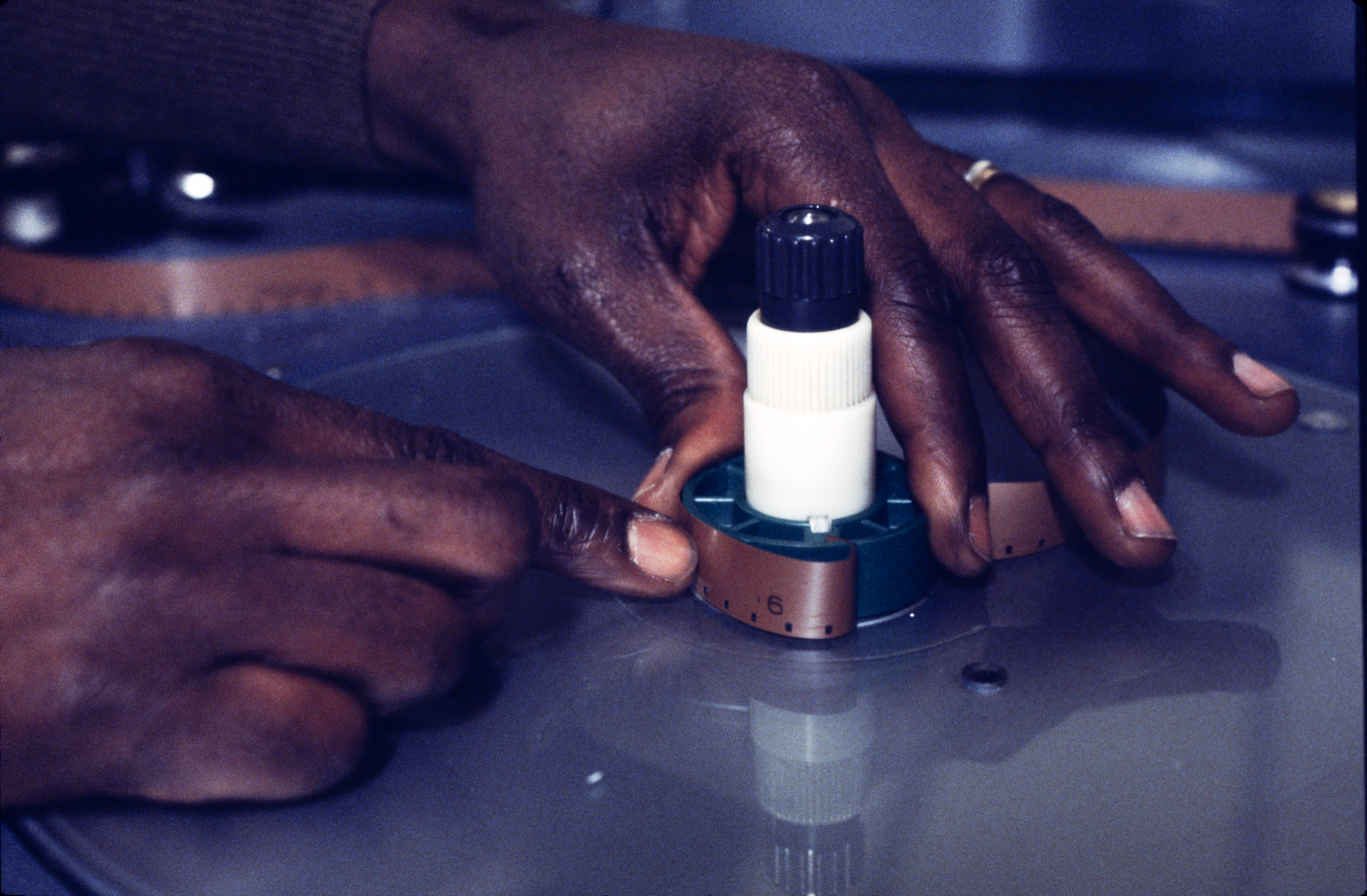

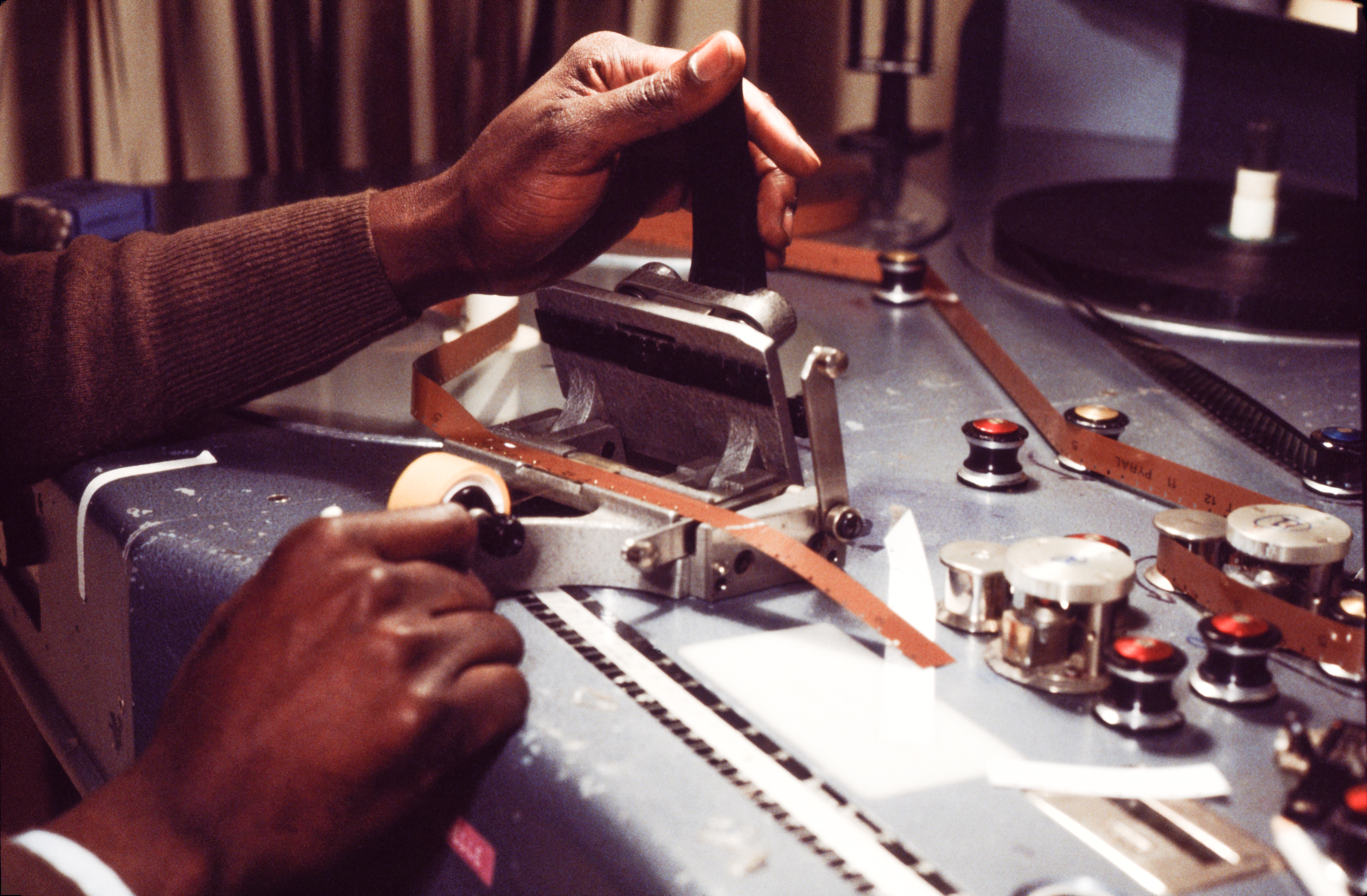

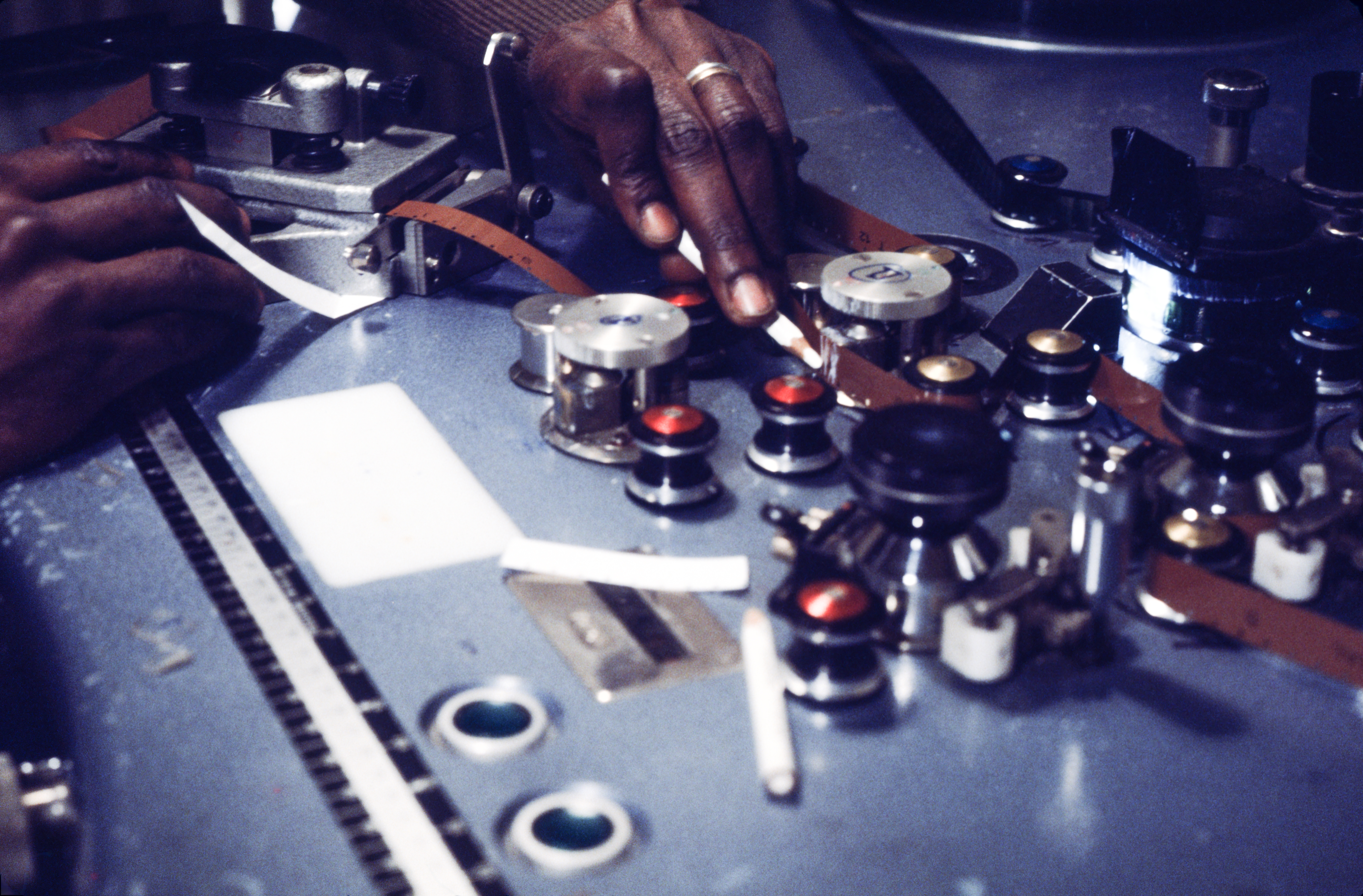

== History ==
One of the first and most popular film editing machines was the Moviola. With it, one could manage a thousand-foot eleven-minute 35 mm roll. It was difficult to use compared to later machines because it did not have high-speed operation. European flatbeds came into more common use in the United States during the 1970s, although never completely replacing the Moviola.

By the mid-1990s, flatbeds were increasingly replaced by computer-based non-linear systems, such as Avid and Lightworks. As of 2007, some film schools were still using flatbed editors for their educational value. Feature films in the United States now use electronic non-linear systems almost exclusively.

== Brands ==
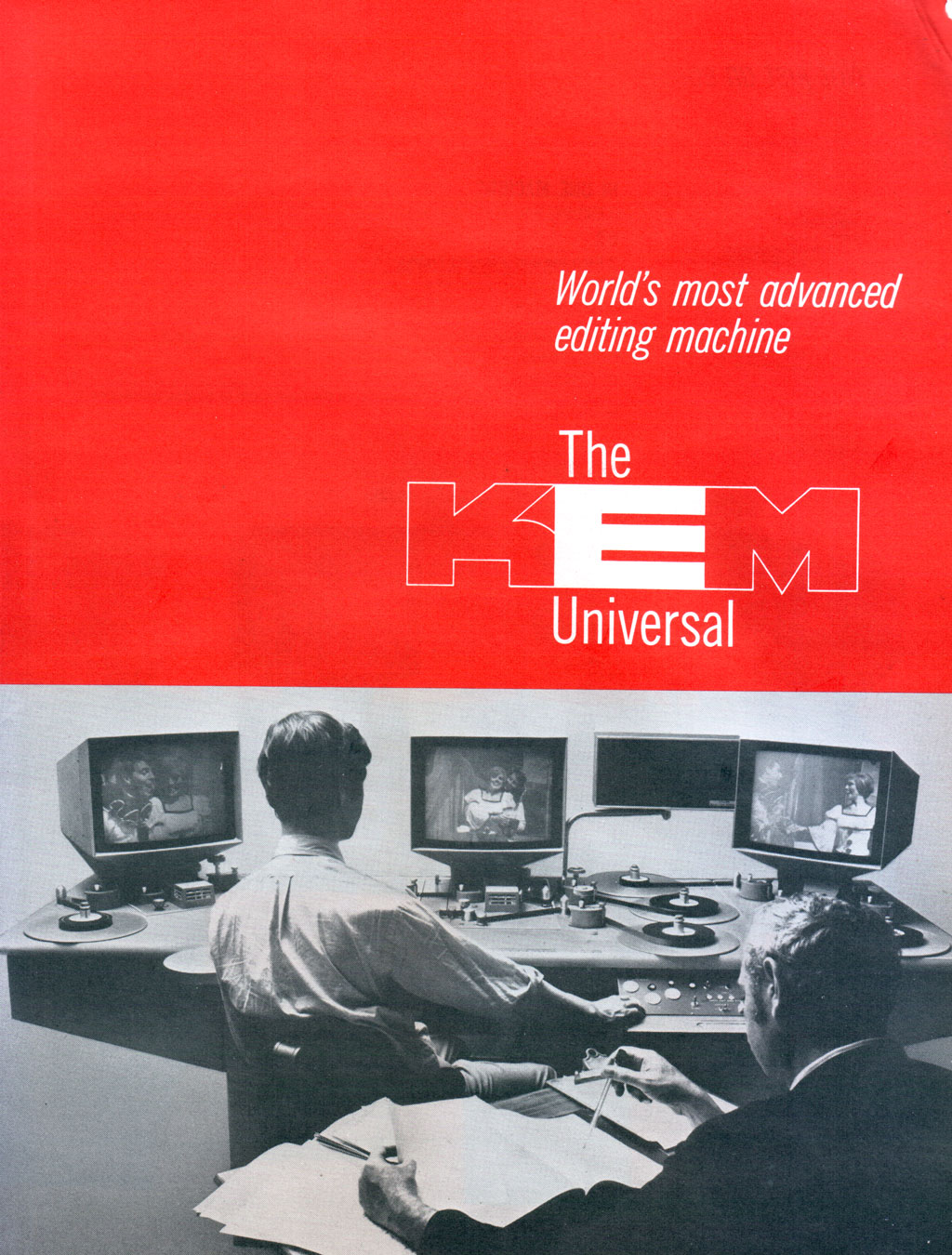
Brochure of KEM horizontal editing table from 1969

The two most common brands of flatbed editor, Steenbeck and K-E-M (Keller-Elektro-Mechanik), were invented in Germany in the 1930s. There are also the Italian Prévost and Intercine, the Dutch Oude Delft or Oldelft, the French Atlas as well as Moritone flatbeds. The U.K. produced the LEM, and America the Moviola flatbed and the exclusively 16 mm Showchron of which approximately 400 were produced in 4, 6, or 8 plate configurations, 6 being the most common. (A few 35 mm Showchrons were built, but never sold commercially.)

All these machines employ a rotating prism rather than the Geneva drive intermittent mechanism first used by the American upright Moviola. The rotating prism allows the editor to move the film smoothly and continuously, reducing mechanical noise and film wear. It also makes high-speed operation feasible, and some machines can move the film at up to ten times standard speed. The K-E-M Universal, which has a modular construction, supports up to three picture heads and up to three soundtracks.

== See also ==
- Film editing
- Film splicer
