= Steinbock (disambiguation) =

Steinbock or Alpine ibex is a species of wild goat living in the Alps.

Steinbock may also refer to:

- Operation Steinbock, a 1944 Luftwaffe bombing campaign against southern England
- Steinbock (icebreaker), a river icebreaker of the Wasser und Schifffahrtsamt

== People with the surname ==
- Anthony Steinbock, American philosopher
- Bonnie Steinbock, American philosopher
- Eberhard Steinböck (fl. 1882–1912), Austrian Olympic sport shooter
- John Thomas Steinbock (1937–2010), American Roman Catholic Bishop of Fresno
- Otto Steinböck (1893–1969), Austrian zoologist

=== Fictional ===
- Wenceslas Steinbock, a character in Cousin Bette

== See also ==
- Steinbach (disambiguation)
- Steinbok (disambiguation)
