= Friedrich Steinbacher =

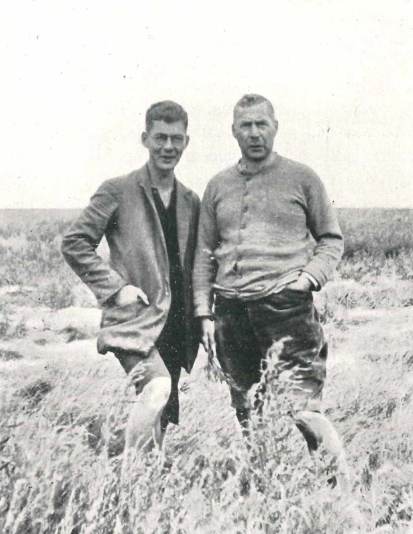
Son Georg and Friedrich Steinbacher in 1929 on Mellum

Friedrich Christian Steinbacher (4 July 1877 – 15 February 1938) was a German mathematician, high-school teacher, natural scientist and ornithologist. He helped Ernst Hartert produce a comprehensive work on the palearctic bird fauna, Die Vögel der paläarktischen Fauna and continued to edit it after Hartert's death from 1933 to 1938. He was the father of Georg and uncle of Joachim Steinbacher who also became ornithologists.

== Life and work ==
Steinbacher came from a Salzburg Protestant family that had moved to Berlin due to religious persecution. He went to a local elementary school before going to the Friedrichs Werder Oberschule. He took an interest in physical fitness activities and was used to hiking under difficult conditions. He also studied Russian and Latin and in 1896 he went to study natural science at the Humboldt University. He took an interest in natural history and was a regular visitor at the museum. He qualified the teacher's exam and began to teach mathematics, physics and biology at high schools. He taught at Frankfurt and from 1904 at Friedrichshagen, Berlin. In 1910 he received a doctorate in mathematics under Ferdinand Georg Frobenius and Hermann Amandus Schwarz. He then served in the army as a driver in an armoured column. After 1920 he began to take a keen interest in ornithology and joined the German Ornithologists’ Society (Deutsche Ornithologische Gesellschaft). He trained students in the study of local bird life, conducting excursions for training teachers. He was elected president of the German ornithological society in 1936. His son Georg Steinbacher became an ornithologist of repute. Ernst Hartert hired Steinbacher for collaboration on the Palearctic birds and found him particularly useful in dealing with the Russian ornithological literature. Steinbacher also helped edit the proceedings of the 6th International Ornithological Congress held in 1926 in Copenhagen and continued to be involved with two more Congresses. He was also a corresponding member of the American Ornithologists Union from 1934. His nephew Joachim Steinbacher, influenced by field trips with his cousin Georg and uncle Friedrich, also became an ornithologist. He described two new subspecies of the reed bunting Emberiza schoeniclus and the subspecies E. s. steinbacheri was named in his honour by Dementiev in 1937, but it is considered a synonym of the nominate subspecies.
