= Stainback =

Stainback is a surname. Notable people with the surname include:

- Charles A. Stainback (c. 1879 – 1961), American lawyer and politician
- George Tucker Stainback (1829–1902), American classicist and Presbyterian minister
- Ingram Stainback (1883–1961), American politician
- Tuck Stainback (1911–1992), American baseball player
