= Joachim Steinbacher =

Joachim Steinbacher (18 November 1911 – 31 July 2005) was a German ornithologist and curator at the Senckenberg-Museum in Frankfurt. He was a writer of both scientific and popular books on birds and served as editor of the avicultural periodical Gefiederte Welt.

== Life and work ==
Steinbacher was born in Hoexter on the river Weser and he grew up in Goslar in the Harz mountains. His interest in natural history as a child was nurtured by his uncle Friedrich Steinbacher who lived in Berlin along with another ornithologist cousin Georg. After his Gymnasium he spent time at the Helgoland bird observatory and later worked on bird migration in the North Sea. He went to study at the University of Göttingen in 1931 and then transferred to Berlin. Between studies he worked at the Rossitten observatory. In 1936 he worked along with Oskar Heinroth and Helmut Sick to produce a vinyl record of bird songs. He completed his doctoral dissertation under Erwin Stresemann in 1937 on the systematics of the Galbulidae and the Bucconidae. He spent some years working at the Berlin Zoo.

In 1940 he replaced Gunther Niethammer, who had moved to Vienna, as head of the ornithological department at the Alexander Koenig Museum in Bonn. After Niethammer's return after the Second World War, Steinbacher moved to the Senckenberg Museum where he became curator in 1954.

Steinbacher published a popular book on bird migration Vogelzug und Vogelzugforschung in 1951 that was translated without his permission into Chinese by Cheng Tso-hsin. A similar Russian translation was also produced.

Steinbacher was awarded the Order of Merit of the Federal Republic of Germany in 1992. He was also made an honorary inspector for nature conservation in Romania in 1965.

Retiring in 1976 he continued to edit the periodical Gefiederte Welt which he had begun to edit from 1938 when he became proficient with captive birds at the Berlin Zoo. He was also a coeditor for the bird volumes of Grzimek's Animal Encyclopaedia.

Steinbacher married Elfriede Hecke in 1940 and they had no children. She died in 1990. Steinbacher died in Bad Homburg vor der Höhe on 31 July 2005.
