= Steinbach (Main) =

River in Germany

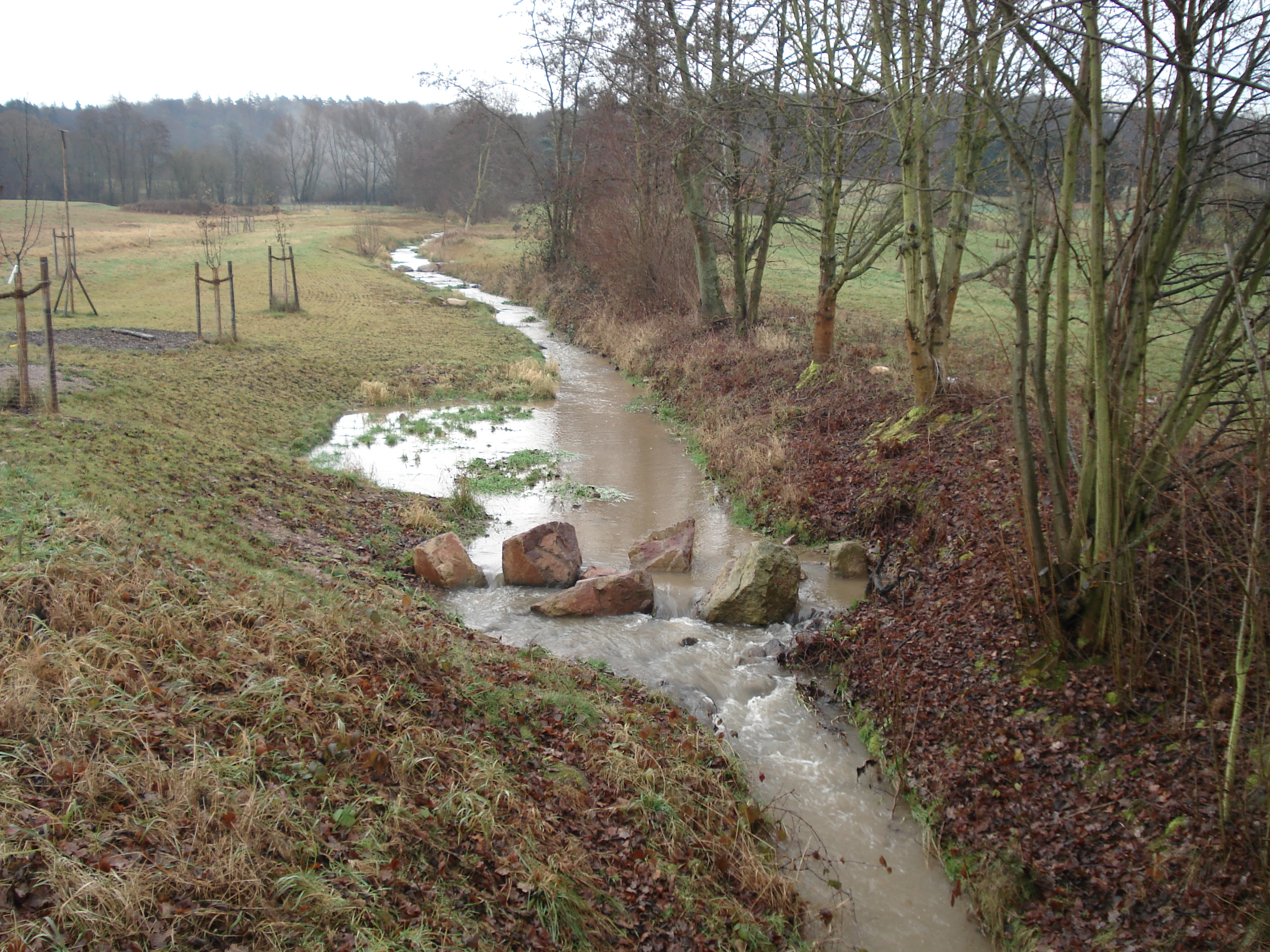
- The Steinbach at Kleinostheim

Location
- Country: Germany
- State: Bavaria

Physical characteristics
- Mouth
  - location: Main
  - coordinates: 49.9948°N 9.0639°E

Basin features
- Progression: Main→ Rhine→ North Sea

The Steinbach is a right and northeastern tributary of the Main near Kleinostheim in the Bavarian Spessart, Germany. It springs above Steinbach, a borough of Johannesberg.

== Geography ==
=== Course ===
From the borough of the same name, the stream is called Steinbach. It flows into the narrow Steinbach valley, where the mill Menzenmühle is believed to have been located. The tributary Roßbach flows in from the right there. A few hundred meters further on, on a rock face by the stream, the so-called Jahnfelsen, a plaque honors Turnvater Jahn.

At the lower end of the Steinbach valley lies the Teschenhöhle. It is the remains of a quarry in which basalt was mined. This igneous rock filled a volcanic vent that was formed around 43 million years ago. The eruption broke through a layer of red sandstone that had not yet been eroded at that time.

In Kleinostheim, the Steinbach is now completely piped and flows into the Main not far from the truck tank depot.

==== Tributaries ====
- Ketterntalgraben (left)
- Roßbach (right)
- Hirschgründchensgraben (right)
- Hollergraben (right)
- Löwensteingraben (right, temporarily dry)

== See also ==
- List of rivers of Bavaria
