= Steinbach (surname) =

Steinbach is a German surname. Notable people with the surname include:

- Debbie Steinbach (born 1953), American golfer
- Eckehard Steinbach, German engineer
- Emil Steinbach (1846–1907), Austrian statesman
- Eric Steinbach (born 1980), American football player
- Erika Steinbach (born 1943), German politician
- Erwin von Steinbach (1244–1318), German architect of the Muenster of Strasbourg
- Fritz Steinbach (1855–1916), German composer
- Haim Steinbach (born 1944), American artist
- Klaus Steinbach (born 1953), German swimmer
- Larry Steinbach (1900–1967), American football player
- Laura Steinbach (born 1985), German handball player
- Manfred Steinbach (born 1933), German sprinter, long jumper, professor of sport medicine and government official
- Michael Steinbach (born 1969), retired German rower
- Nico Steinbach (born 1984), German politician
- Settela Steinbach (1934–1944), Dutch holocaust victim
- Terry Steinbach (born 1962), retired American baseball player
- Wolfgang Steinbach (born 1954), former German football player and manager

== See also ==
- Steinbach (disambiguation)
