= Jan Stenbeck =

Swedish businessman (1942–2002)

- Born: Jan Hugo Robert Arne Stenbeck; 14 November 1942; Stockholm, Sweden
- Died: 19 August 2002 (aged 59); Paris, France
- Education: Östra Real
- Alma mater: Uppsala University; Harvard Business School
- Occupations: Financier, entrepreneur, media owner
- Years active: 1970–2002
- Spouse: Merrill McLeod (m. 1976; div. 1999)
- Children: 5, including Cristina and Max
- Parent: Hugo Stenbeck
- Relatives: Margaretha af Ugglas (sister)

Jan Hugo Robert Arne Stenbeck (Swedish pronunciation: [ˈjɑːn ˈstêːnbɛk]; 14 November 1942 – 19 August 2002) was a Swedish business leader, media pioneer, sailor and financier. He was head of Kinnevik Group from 1976 and founded among other things the companies Comviq, Invik & Co AB, Tele2, Banque Invik, Millicom, Modern Times Group and NetCom Systems. Stenbeck was one of Sweden's wealthiest people, worth some $800 million.

== Early life ==
Stenbeck was born on 14 November 1942 in Stockholm, the youngest son of business lawyer Hugo Stenbeck (1890–1977) and his wife Märtha (née Odelfelt; 1906–1992). He was brother of Hugo Jr (1933–1976), Elisabeth Silfverstolpe (1935–1985) and the former Swedish Minister for Foreign Affairs, Margaretha af Ugglas (born 1939).

He passed the studentexamen at Östra Real in Stockholm and received a Candidate of Law degree from Uppsala University and a Master of Business Administration degree from Harvard Business School in United States in 1970.

== Career ==
After Harvard, Stenbeck went to work for Morgan Stanley & Co Inc. in New York City from 1970 to 1976 and then his career in business continued with the formation of the mobile phone company Millicom.

After his father, Hugo Stenbeck, had died, Stenbeck returned to Sweden and gained control over Investment AB Kinnevik after a bitter feud with his sisters. He came to change the focus of the investment company away from traditional Swedish industries, such as pulp and paper industry and steel manufacturing towards media and telecommunication. In 1987 he started Sweden's first free, advertising-funded TV channel, TV3, then Comviq and Tele2, the free newspaper Metro, the magazine Z and the magazine Moderna Tider. Control of the Kinnevik Group was passed to his daughter Cristina Stenbeck after his death of a heart attack.

== Personal life ==
On 22 December 1976 in Glen Head, New York, Stenbeck married Merrill MacLeod (1944–2006), the daughter of the editor and the publicist Robert Fredric McLeod and Caroly (née Waring). Together they had the children Cristina (born 1977), Hugo (born 1979), Sophie (born 1981), and Max Stenbeck (1985–2015). He also acknowledged paternity of the son Felix Granander, who was born in 1997 out of wedlock. At the time of his death, Stenbeck was divorced from his wife.

Stenbeck and MacLeod divorced in 1999, and then Stenbeck moved to a farm in Luxembourg that he had bought six years earlier.

== Death ==
Stenbeck died of a heart attack in American Hospital of Paris in Paris on 19 August 2002 at the age of 59. Stenbeck's funeral was held in great secrecy two weeks later in Storkyrkan in Stockholm. He had suffered from a cold during the summer and had an inflammation in his body when his condition suddenly worsened. At his death he had a net worth of 800 million dollars.
