= Hugo Stenbeck =

Swedish lawyer (1890–1977)

- Born: Edvard Hugo Stenbeck; 15 October 1890; Uppsala, Sweden
- Died: 6 January 1977 (aged 86); Stockholm, Sweden
- Occupation: Lawyer
- Children: 4; including Jan Stenbeck and Margaretha af Ugglas

Edvard Hugo Stenbeck (15 October 1890 – 6 January 1977) was a Swedish lawyer and founder of Investment AB Kinnevik. He belonged to a group called in to investigate the collapse of Ivar Kreuger's financial empire. Two of his children became famous in their own right – Jan Stenbeck took over and transformed the family company and Margaretha af Ugglas became foreign minister. His granddaughter, Cristina Stenbeck is now in charge of the family companies.

== Early life ==
Stenbeck was born on 15 October 1890 in Uppsala, Sweden, the son of banker Nils Stenbeck and his wife Maria Rydberg. He received a Candidate of Law degree from Uppsala University in 1914.

== Career ==
Stenbeck was the owner of the law firm Advokatfirman Lagerlöf in Stockholm from 1923. He was a member of the Swedish Bar Association from 1924.

In the mid-1940s, Stenbeck was a member of the board of Korsnäs Sågverks AB, AB Kinnevik, Ställbergs Gruv AB, Rydboholms AB, AB de Lavals Ångturbin, Dahlkarlshytte AB, Halmstads Järnverks AB, Svenska Suchard AB, Marma-Långrörs AB etc. In the early 1960s, Stenbeck was a member of the board of Korsnäs AB, Investment AB Kinnevik, Ställbergs grufve AB, Rydboholms AB, Turbin AB de Laval Ljungström, Förvaltning AB Laval, Halmstads Järnverks AB, Marma-Långrörs AB, Mellersta Sveriges Lantbruks AB, Bultfabriks AB, Höganäs-Billesholms AB, Munkedals AB, Robert Bosch AB, Sandvikens jernverks AB, Sv träimpr:ab, STAB etc.

== Personal life ==
In 1932, Hugo Stenbeck married Märtha Odelfelt (1906–1992), the daughter of banker Andreas Odelfelt and Hedvig Lalin. They had four children: Hugo Jr (1933–1976), Elisabeth (1935–1985), Margareta (born 1939), Jan (1942–2002).

== Death ==
Stenbeck died on 6 January 1977 in Stockholm. Stenbeck and his wife Märtha were cremated and their remains rest in urn at the columbarium of Engelbrekt Parish at Karlavägen, not far from their home on Villagatan. The columbarium on Karlavägen is situated below Engelbrekt Church.

== Awards and decorations ==
- (Sweden) Commander of the Order of Vasa
- (Sweden) Knight of the Order of the Polar Star

== Honours ==
- Honorary member of Värmlands nation of Uppsala University
