= Georg Steinbacher =

German ornithologist (1910–1979)

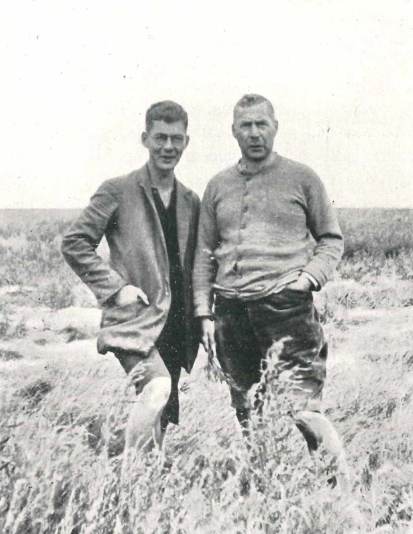
Georg with his father Friedrich Steinbacher in 1929 on Mellum

Georg Steinbacher (September 18, 1910 – May 25, 1979) was a German ornithologist and a director of the Frankfurt zoo and later the Augsburg zoo. He was the son of the ornithologist Friedrich Steinbacher.

Steinbacher was born in Friedrichshagen near Berlin, the son of the ornithologist Friedrich Steinbacher (1877–1938). Interested in birds from an early age he studied zoology at Berlin and Munich. He studied ornithologist under Erwin Stresemann studying the anatomy of the toes of birds. He then worked as an assistant at the Berlin Zoological Gardens under Ludwig Heck. In 1938 he succeeded Kurt Priemel as director of Frankfurt Zoo. He was drafted into World War II where was wounded and hospitalized. At the end of the war, he was taken for dead and his position at Berlin Zoo was taken over by Bernhard Grzimek. When he returned from hospital in September 1945 he was forced to resign from the position he had held at Berlin. He then worked at Cologne Zoo and later Augsburg Zoo from 1947 until he retired in 1978. He had a special interest in the management of birds and published extensively. He was a member of the Swabian natural science society and was a professor at the University of Augsburg from 1975. He died in Kissing near Augsburg. A street in Augsburg was named after him as Professor-Steinbacher-Straße in 1982.
