= Stanback =

Stanback is a surname. Notable people with the surname include:

- Anne Stanback (born 1958), American activist
- Harry Stanback (born 1958), American football player
- Haskel Stanback (born 1952), American football player
- Isaiah Stanback (born 1984), American football player
- Israel Pinkney Stanback (1908–1985), American businessman and philanthropist from South Carolina, who the I. P. Stanback Museum is named for
