= Eckehard Steinbach =

German electrical engineer and academic

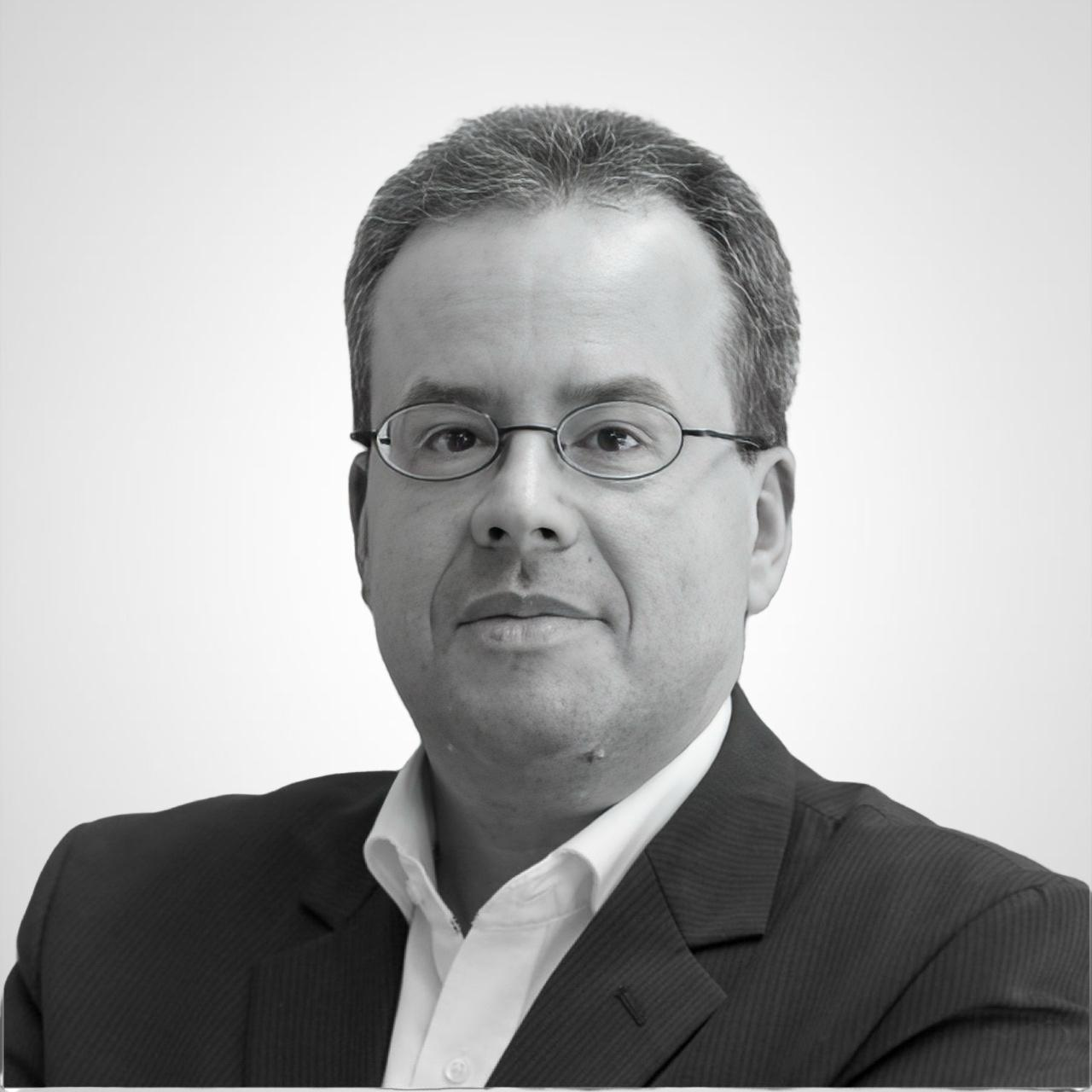
- German electrical engineer and professor at TUM
- Education: University of Karlsruhe; University of Essex; ESIEE Paris; Friedrich-Alexander University Erlangen-Nuremberg
- Known for: Haptic communication and the Tactile Internet
- Awards: IEEE Fellow (2015)
- Scientific career
- Fields: Electrical engineering, multimedia, haptics
- Workplaces: Technical University of Munich

Eckehard Steinbach (born 1969) is a German electrical engineer and academic who is professor of media technology at the Technical University of Munich (TUM). His research includes audiovisual and haptic information processing and communication, telepresence, teleoperation, multimedia systems, indoor localization and machine-learning-based analysis of visual and haptic data. He was named an IEEE Fellow in 2015 for contributions to visual and haptic communications.

== Education and career ==
Steinbach studied electrical engineering at the University of Karlsruhe, the University of Essex and ESIEE Paris. He received his doctorate in 1999 from Friedrich-Alexander University Erlangen-Nuremberg. From 2000 to 2002 he conducted research at Stanford University, initially as a postdoctoral researcher and later as a consulting assistant professor. In 2002 he joined TUM as associate professor of media technology, and in 2009 he became chair of media technology there. From October 2017 to September 2020 he served as dean of studies of TUM's Faculty of Electrical Engineering and Information Technology.

== Research ==
According to TUM, Steinbach's work has included mobile multimedia communication, haptic data compression, indoor localization and the machine-learning-based analysis of visual and haptic information. A central strand of his research has dealt with haptic communication and telepresence. The European Research Council-funded project PROHAPTICS, coordinated by TUM from 2011 to 2015, investigated methods for the efficient processing and communication of haptic signals and stated an ambition to establish a de facto standard for future haptic data communication.

In an interview published by CORDIS, the European Commission's research-results service, Steinbach described teleoperation with haptic feedback as one of the main application scenarios for haptic communication. He later chaired the IEEE P1918.1.1 Haptic Codec Task Group on haptic codecs for the Tactile Internet. IEEE 1918.1.1-2024, the IEEE Standard for Haptic Codecs for the Tactile Internet, was published on 14 June 2024. According to TUM and reporting by Ingenieur.de, the standardization effort was carried out under a consortium led by TUM and involved researchers led by Steinbach.

== Honours and recognition ==
Steinbach received the 2011 Research Award Technical Communications (Forschungspreis Technische Kommunikation) of the Alcatel-Lucent Foundation for Communications Research for work on haptic communication and telepresence. He was elevated to IEEE Fellow in 2015 for contributions to visual and haptic communications. According to TUM, his other distinctions include an ERC Starting Grant (2011–2015), the VDE-ITG Publication Award (2009), and the Best Technology Paper Award at IEEE World Haptics (2009).

== Selected publications ==
- Steinbach, Eckehard; Hirche, Sandra; Kammerl, Julius; Vittorias, Iason; Chaudhari, Rahul (2011). "Haptic data compression and communication". IEEE Signal Processing Magazine. 28 (1): 87–96. doi:10.1109/MSP.2010.938753.
- Steinbach, Eckehard; Hirche, Sandra; Ernst, Marc; Brandi, Fernanda; Chaudhari, Rahul; Kammerl, Julius; Vittorias, Iason (2012). "Haptic communications". Proceedings of the IEEE. 100 (4): 937–956. doi:10.1109/JPROC.2011.2182100.
- Steinbach, Eckehard; Strese, Matti; Eid, Mohamad; Liu, Xun; Bhardwaj, Amit; Liu, Qian; et al. (2019). "Haptic codecs for the tactile internet". Proceedings of the IEEE. 107 (2): 447–470. doi:10.1109/JPROC.2018.2867835.
- Schroth, Georg; Huitl, Robert; Chen, David; Abu-Alqumsan, Mohammad; Al-Nuaimi, Anas; Steinbach, Eckehard (2011). "Mobile visual location recognition". IEEE Signal Processing Magazine. 28 (4): 77–89. doi:10.1109/MSP.2011.940882.
