= Lightworks =

Video editing software

- Developer: LWKS Software Ltd
- Release: 1989; 37 years ago
- Operating system: Linux; macOS; Windows
- Platform: IA-32
- Size: 93 MB
- Available in: English
- Type: Non-linear editing system
- License: Freemium
- Website: www.lwks.com

Lightworks is a freemium non-linear editing system (NLE) for editing and mastering digital video. It was an early developer of computer-based non-linear editing systems, and has been in development since 1998. The development of an open-source version was announced on April 11, 2010. However, no source code of the program has been released. In July 2020, a Lightworks product manager confirmed that they "still hope to announce something in the future" about Lightworks' open source development.

== Features ==
The free version comes with a limited number of features:

- Multicam editing
- Second monitor output
- Ability to import a range of file types
- Export to Vimeo (H.264/MPEG-4) up to 1080p
- Export to YouTube (H.264/MPEG-4) up to 1080p

The free version cannot export to DVD or Blu-ray, but can export to a hard drive (since Lightworks 14).

== History ==
Lightworks was created in 1989, by Paul Bamborough, Nick Pollock and Neil Harris. In 1995 it was sold to Tektronix. In 1999 it was sold on to the newly formed Lightworks Inc., then owned by Fairlight Japan, and then purchased by Gee Broadcast in May 2004. In August 2009 Lightworks was acquired by EditShare LLC. On September 15 2020 Lightworks was acquired by LWKS Software Ltd.

=== Gee Broadcast ownership, 2004–2009 ===
Under Gee Broadcast ownership, new product releases resumed with the release of the Lightworks Touch range, and the Alacrity and Softworks ranges for SD & HD editing. Softworks offered the Lightworks User Interface and toolset in a software only package for laptops or office workstations. Alacrity supported dual outputs while the same facility was available for Softworks users as an option.

=== EditShare ownership, 2009–2020 ===
In August 2009, the UK and US based company EditShare acquired Gee Broadcast and the Lightworks editing platform from, along with their video server system GeeVS.

At the annual convention of the National Association of Broadcasters, NAB Show, on 11 April 2010, EditShare announced that they plan to transform Lightworks into Lightworks Open Source. It was presented at IBC in Amsterdam September 2010.

On 9 November 2010, EditShare announced that Lightworks would be downloadable on 29 November of the same year, at first exclusively for the users who had registered during the initial announcement, but subsequently publishing the software as "public beta".

EditShare planned the release of the open source version in Q4 of 2011, after they finished code review. They plan to make money from proprietary plugins offered in their associated online shop, including plugins needed to access professional video formats. Shortly before the scheduled release date of 29 November 2011, EditShare announced that an open source release of the software would be temporarily delayed, but did not announce a new release date. The announcement noted that they were not yet satisfied with the stability of the new version.

==== Windows version released at NAB 2012 ====
After an 18-month beta program, EditShare released Lightworks 11, for Windows only, on 28 May 2012. The non beta release of Lightworks includes a host of new features for editors, and runs on wide range of PC hardware. The software was re-designed and re-written for portability (versions for Linux and Mac OS X have also been released) and now supports many more codecs including AVCHD, H.264, AVC-Intra, DNxHD, ProRes, Red R3D, DPX, XDCAM HD 50, XDCAM EX, DVD, Blu-ray, and 4K, but only for the paid Pro version. The free version supports DV, MPEG, Uncompressed and other codecs for both import and export.

==== Windows version 11.1 released 29 May 2013 ====
On 29 May 2013, v11.1 stable release was made available for download. A major development in the Pro version is improved performance of the H.264/AVC codec in MP4 and MOV containers. This makes it possible to edit this format natively, even with less powerful CPUs. This should interest HDSLR and GoPro camera users. Native editing of H.264 MTS files has been possible since version 11.0.3.

This version of Lightworks has also replaced HASP with the new EditShare Licensing System (ELS), which eliminates some installation problems. The Free version now also comes with a 30-day Pro Trial period.

==== Linux version announced at IBC 2012 ====
EditShare demonstrated the Linux version at the NAB in Las Vegas in April 2012, and posted a video of it running on Ubuntu on their YouTube channel. At IBC in Amsterdam in September, an updated Linux demo was presented, and EditShare announced that the initial Linux alpha version would become available on 30 October . Lightworks 11 alpha for Linux was released on 30 April 2012, but only to a limited audience. The Linux version of Lightworks was made available as a Public Beta on 30 April 2013.

==== Lightworks 12 beta released for Windows, Linux and Mac ====
On 8 August 2014, the first beta of Lightworks version 12 working on Windows, Linux and Mac was released.

==== Lightworks 12.6 released for Windows, Linux and Mac ====
On 29 August 2015, Lightworks version 12.5 for Windows, Linux and Mac was released.

==== Lightworks 12.7 released for Windows, Linux and Mac ====
On 4 February 2016, Lightworks version 12.6 for Windows, Linux and Mac was released.

==== Lightworks 14.5 released for Windows, Linux and Mac ====
In October 2018, Lightworks released version 14.5 for Windows, Linux and Mac platforms. 14.5 added a vast array of new features including variable frame rate support, a huge amount of codec support including Red Cinema R3D, Cineform and Blackmagic Q1 codecs.

=== LWKS Software Ltd ownership, 2020-present ===
In September 2020, a new company, LWKS Software Ltd, founded in August of the same year by two members of the development team, took ownership of Lightworks, as well as QScan AQC software. the agreement also mentions Key member of the development teams of both software joining the new company.

== Users ==
Several feature films have been edited in Lightworks. Notably, Thelma Schoonmaker has edited several of Martin Scorsese's films using the software.

| Film title | Year | Director | Editor |
|---|---|---|---|
| Pulp Fiction | 1994 | Quentin Tarantino | Sally Menke |
| The Cure | 1995 | Peter Horton | Anthony Sherin |
| Congo | 1995 | Frank Marshall | Anne V. Coates |
| Heat | 1995 | Michael Mann | Dov Hoenig |
| Braveheart | 1995 | Mel Gibson | Steven Rosenblum |
| Romeo + Juliet | 1996 | Baz Luhrmann | Jill Bilcock |
| Broken Arrow | 1996 | John Woo | John Wright |
| L.A. Confidential | 1997 | Curtis Hanson | Peter Honess |
| Moulin Rouge! | 2001 | Baz Luhrmann | Jill Bilcock |
| 28 Days Later | 2002 | Danny Boyle | Chris Gill |
| Bruce Almighty | 2003 | Tom Shadyac | Scott Hill |
| Revolutionary Road | 2008 | Sam Mendes | Tariq Anwar |
| Centurion | 2010 | Neil Marshall | Chris Gill |
| The King's Speech | 2010 | Tom Hooper | Tariq Anwar |
| Shutter Island | 2010 | Martin Scorsese | Thelma Schoonmaker |
| The Wolf of Wall Street | 2013 | Martin Scorsese | Thelma Schoonmaker |
| Silence | 2016 | Martin Scorsese | Thelma Schoonmaker |
| The Irishman | 2019 | Martin Scorsese | Thelma Schoonmaker |
| Killers of the Flower Moon | 2023 | Martin Scorsese | Thelma Schoonmaker |

== See also ==
- List of video editing software
- Comparison of video editing software
