= Steinbeck (surname) =

Steinbeck is a surname, which may refer to:

- Christoph Steinbeck (born 1966), German chemistry researcher
- Elaine Anderson Steinbeck (1914–2003), American actress and stage manager
- Janet Steinbeck (born 1951), Australian swimmer and olympic medalist
- Muriel Steinbeck (1913–1982), Australian radio, television, theatre, and film actress
- John Steinbeck (1902–1968), an American author
  - Thomas Steinbeck (1944–2016), American author, screenwriter, and son of John Steinbeck
  - John Steinbeck IV (1946–1991), American journalist and son of John Steinbeck
- Walter Steinbeck (1878–1942), German film actor

== See also ==
- Steinbruck
- Steinbock (disambiguation)
- Steenbech
