= Max Stenbeck =

Swedish-American entrepreneur and financier

Max Stenbeck (1985 in Long Island, New York – 16 March 2015 in New York City) was a Swedish-American entrepreneur and financier. His father was Swedish entrepreneur Jan Stenbeck.

Stenbeck died at age 30 after suffering from complications of diabetes.

Stenbeck, along with Henry Guy, was the founder of venture capital firm, Basset Investment Group. Basset Investment Group was an early stage venture fund. Investments included Coupang, Fan Duel, & Boxed.
