= Moorenweis =

- Municipality
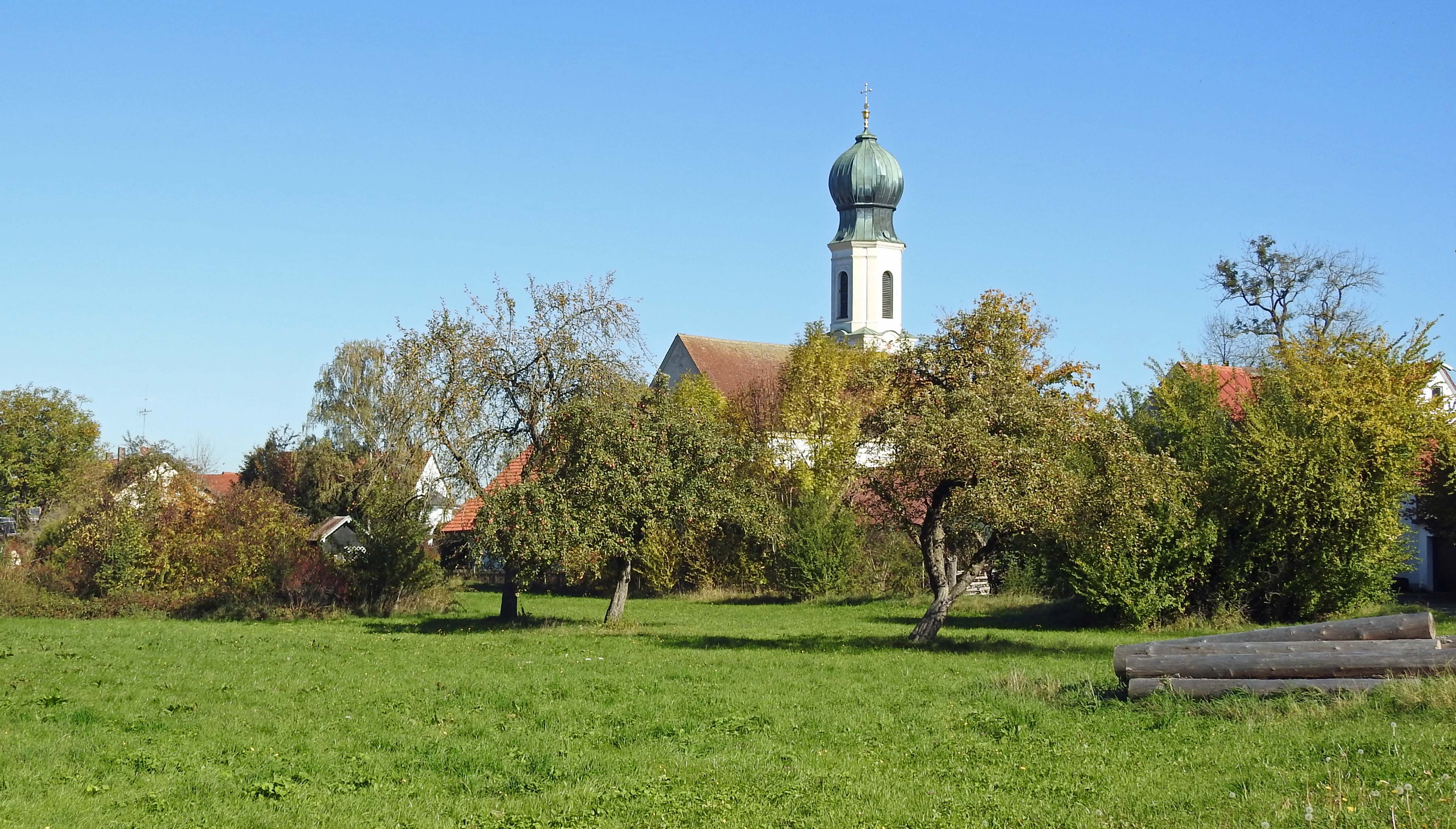
- Parish church

- Coat of arms

- Location of Moorenweis within Fürstenfeldbruck district
- Interactive map of Moorenweis
- Location within Germany Location within Bavaria
- Coordinates: 48°09′N 11°05′E
- Country: Germany
- State: Bavaria
- Admin. region: Oberbayern
- District: Fürstenfeldbruck

Government
  - Mayor (2020–26): Josef Schäffler (CSU)

Area
  - Total: 45.45 km^{2} (17.55 sq mi)
- Elevation: 550–595 m (1,804–1,952 ft)

Population (2025-12-31)
  - Total: 4,112
  - Density: 90.47/km^{2} (234.3/sq mi)
- Time zone: UTC+01:00 (CET)
  - Summer (DST): UTC+02:00 (CEST)
- Postal codes: 82272
- Dialling codes: 08146
- Vehicle registration: FFB
- Website: www.moorenweis.de

Moorenweis (German pronunciation: [ˈmoːʁənvaɪs]) is a municipality in the district of Fürstenfeldbruck in Bavaria in Germany.
