= List of Stockholm School of Economics people =

The list of Stockholm School of Economics alumni includes notable graduates, professors and administrators affiliated with Stockholm School of Economics.

== Business ==
- Ola Källenius, CEO of Mercedes-Benz
- Jan Carlzon, former CEO of SAS Group
- Fredrik Eklund, real estate broker
- Erik Engstrom, CEO of Reed Elsevier
- Christer Gardell, CEO of AB Custos and founder of Cevian Capital
- Reinhold Geijer, head of the Nordic Region for The Royal Bank of Scotland
- Per Olof Loof, CEO of KEMET Corporation
- Ruben Rausing, founder of liquid food packaging company Tetra Pak
- Charlotte Strömberg, CEO Nordic branch of JLL
- Oscar Swartz, founder of Internet service provider Bahnhof
- Carl Pei, CEO of Nothing

== Economics ==
- Eli Heckscher, political economist, economic historian and co-developer of the Heckscher–Ohlin model
- Gunnar Myrdal, Nobel laureate economist, sociologist, and politician
- Bertil Ohlin, Nobel laureate economist, politician and co-developer of the Heckscher–Ohlin model

== Politics ==
- Margaretha af Ugglas, former Moderate Party politician and previous Minister of Foreign Affairs
- Magdalena Andersson, former prime minister of Sweden and head of the Swedish Social Democratic Party
- Erik Åsbrink, politician of the Swedish Social Democratic Party and former Minister of Finance
- Klas Eklund, economist and writer
- Ali Esbati, former chairman of Young Left, member of the Swedish Parliament for Vänsterpartiet
- Stefan Ingves, Governor of Sveriges Riksbank
- Olof Johansson, former leader of the Swedish Centre Party
- Erik Lakomaa, political consultant and strategist for the no-campaign in the Swedish 2003 Euro referendum
- Mikael Odenberg, politician of the Moderate Party; former Minister of Defence
- Per Westerberg, former Speaker of the Riksdag

== Culture and entertainment ==
- Alexander Bard, musician and writer
- Jonas Hassen Khemiri, novelist and playwright
- Kristian Luuk, comedian and television host
- Niklas Modig, best-selling author and management speaker
- Lars Nittve, art critic and director of Moderna Museet
- Johan Renck, director and musician
- Max Tegmark, physicist and author

== Academics ==
- Evert Gummesson, professor of marketing and management
- Mette Morsing, professor

== See also ==
- Category:Stockholm School of Economics alumni
- Category:Academic staff of the Stockholm School of Economics
