= Artur Stefan Kirsten =

German economist (born 1961)

- Born: 22 February 1961

Academic background
- Education: Leuphana Universität Lüneburg (PhD 1990)

Academic work
- Discipline: Corporate Governance, Finance, Accounting
- Institutions: Westfälische Hochschule (Germany)

Artur Stefan Kirsten (born February 22, 1961, in Berlin) is a German manager and honorary professor of economics at Westfälische Hochschule (Germany).

== Life ==
Artur Stefan Kirsten went to school in Hamburg, Erftstadt and Buchholz in der Nordheide from 1967 to 1980. After his final exams, the German Abitur, he enlisted for military service. He is currently officer in the reserve in the rank of Major. Parallel, he started his studies at the University of Hagen in Economics, Mathematics and Statistics in 1981, which he continued after his military service at Georg-August-Universität Göttingen in Business Administration. The diploma degree was followed by doctoral studies at Leuphana University of Lüneburg in Business Law. In 1990 he took part in the Comprehensive Defense Course (Lehrgang Gesamtverteidigung) at the Führungsakademie der Bundeswehr.

Stefan Kirsten is married and has a daughter from his first marriage, who was born in 1998.

== Work ==
During his doctoral studies Kirsten started to work as audit assistant for the tax-consulting and auditing company Arthur Andersen & Co. in Hamburg in 1986. In 1987 he changed to a position as assistant to the CEO of Rheinmetall GmbH in Düsseldorf. In 1990 he was responsible for the department controlling of affiliates and shareholdings at WMF Württembergische Metallwaren Fabrik AG in Geislingen an der Steige.

In 1992 Artur Stefan Kirsten went to London as director, finance and planning of EMI Music Continental Europe, 1994 his role was enlarged at EMI International to vice president of finance in the sector Europe and Operations and he became deputy managing director of the German affiliate EMI Electrola GmbH in Köln in 1995. 1996 he moved on to Metro AG in Köln as director of planning and controlling. His main duty was to establish structures and processes in order to lead Metro Group as an integrated group and enable it to compete in international capital markets. In 1998 he was executive manager and from 2000 a member of the board of directors and chief financial officer in Düsseldorf.

In 2002 he moved on to ThyssenKrupp in Düsseldorf as CFO and board member. In this period he was mainly responsible for the accelerated reduction of company debts as well as the changeover to International Financial Reporting Standards (IFRS), then still International Accounting Standards (IAS). He did not renew his expiring contract as CFO in 2007.

In August 2007 he became CFO and in 2008 chief executive officer at Majid Al Futtaim Group in Dubai and in 2010 partner at SCCO International, Dubai. From 2010 to 2011 and again from 2015 he was part of the supervisory board of Jerónimo Martins SGPS, SA in Lisbon, as well as in several holding companies and affiliates of the same group. From 2018 to 2020 he was member of the supervisory board of Flaschenpost SE in Münster, Germany.

In 2011 Artur Stefan Kirsten became CFO of the German housing company Deutsche Annington. His main duties were to successfully refinance Europe's largest private securitization – GRAND (German Residential Asset Note Distributor plc) – by the end of 2012 in order to execute the IPO in 2013. Furthermore, he was co-responsible for the acquisition of the competitor GAGFAH SA by Deutsche Annington in 2014, which was decisive for the name change of the group to Vonovia SE. The company was successfully included in the Dax 30 in September 2015. In May 2018 he ended his executive board role at his own request. FRom 2019 until 2022 was Kirsten a member of the Advisory Board of Vivion Group in Luxemburg, and from 2020 until 2022 he was an advisor for the international infrastructure and mining fonds Foundamental based in Berlin, San Francisco and Singapore.

In 2021, Kirsten co-founded Monarch with Gerhard Schindler, Tom Enders, Sandro Gaycken, Benjamin Rohé and others, which focuses on issues of democracy assurance and information security in complex data situations, as well as methods for tracking cyber fraud and corruption. He serves the Company in the CFO position.

On 16 February 2022, Kirsten was appointed as new member and chairman of the board of directors of Adler Group S.A.

== Academic career ==
Artur Stefan Kirsten earned his doctorate degree (Dr. rer pol.) at the faculty of Economics and Social Sciences of the Leuphana University of Lüneburg in 1990. His thesis discussed criteria for enhanced audit certificates in the German Commercial Code, Kriterien zur Ergänzung des Bestätigungsvermerks gem. § 322 Absatz 2 HGB. Furthermore, he took part in the Stanford Executive Program at Stanford University's Graduate School of Business in 1996. In 1997 he took up his teaching position at Westfälische Hochschule in Gelsenkirchen, which appointed him honorary professor at the faculty of Economics in 2001. His teaching is focused on Corporate Governance, Finance and Accounting.

He supported Jonas Ridderstråle and Kjell A. Nordström with his expertise for their book project Karaoke Capitalism: Management for Mankind in 2003. In 2007 he was Visiting Scholar at Stanford University in the faculty for Management Science and Engineering, where he taught Risk Management and carried out research concerning key problems in Behavioural Finance. In July 2016 he was invited as a guest speaker at the 12th Handelsblatt CFO Congress.

== Awards ==
- 2004 and 2005 European CFO of the year for the Steel Industry by Thomson Reuters
- 2015 Corporate Finance Award – Sustainability in Financial Strategy of the German Börsen-Zeitung
- 2017 CFO of the Year for Germany by the magazine Finance
- 2017 and 2018 Best CFO in the category 2018 All-Europe Executive Team. Financial Institutions: Property and in the categories Overall and Sell-Side by Institutional Investor

== Board of directors' seats ==
- since 2012 Sociedade Francisco Manuel dos Santos BCV, Netherlands
- 2015 - 2022 Vonovia Finance BV, Netherlands
- since 2015 Jerónimo Martins, Portugal
- 2017–2018 Conwert Immobilien Invest SE, Austria
- since 2017 Movendo Capital BV, Netherlands
- 2018–2019 Buwog AG, Austria
- 2018–2020 Flaschenpost SE, Germany
- since 2021 Non Executive Member of the Board – Footprint International Holdings Inc, USA
- since 2021 Member of the Administration Board of Planted Foods AG Zürich, Switzerland
- since 2022 Chairman of the Board of Adler Group SA in Luxembourg

== Honorary appointments ==
- since 2004 Board of Directors Stanford Club of Germany e. V., Berlin
- 2006–2008 and since 2016 Board of Directors of Wirtschaftswissenschaftliche Gesellschaft at Humboldt University of Berlin
- since 2018 member of the Board of Trustees of the Soldiers and Veterans Foundation (SVS) of the Deutscher Bundeswehrverband (German Armed Forces Federation).

== Publications ==
- (2016) "Immobilienfinanzierung über den Kapitalmarkt". In: Schäfer, Jürgen; Conzen, Georg (eds.). Praxishandbuch Immobilien-Investitionen, 4th ed. Munich: Verlag C.H. Beck. ISBN 978340674738-0. (in German)
- (2007) with Crasselt, Nils and Pellens, Bernhard: "Die Bedeutung des Ratings für die Investitions- und Finanzplanung". In: Seicht, Gerhard (ed.): Jahrbuch für Controlling und Rechnungswesen 2007. Vienna: LexisNexis ARD Orac. pp. 99–113. ISBN 9783700736066. (in German)
- (2006) with Schiffer, Johannes: "Pensionen als Herausforderung für Unternehmen". In: ZfbF, Schmalenbachs Zeitschrift für betriebswirtschaftliche Forschung. 5, Vol. 58. Wiesbaden: Springer Fachmedien. p. 675–689. ISSN 0341-2687. (in German)
- (2005) with Berlien, Olaf; Oelert, Jochen; Schutt, Robert: "Wertsteigerung durch das Konzernprogramm best bei ThyssenKrupp". In: Schweickart, Nikolaus; Töpfer, Armin (eds.). Wertorientiertes Management: Werterhaltung – Wertsteuerung – Wertsteigerung ganzheitlich gestalten. Heidelberg: Springer. pp. 597–608. ISBN 9783540258681. (in German)
- (2004) "Geeignetes Controlling für den finanziellen Erfolg entscheidend", Supplement to Börsen-Zeitung, 188, Sept 29. (in German)
- (2004) "Globalisierung: Herausforderung für Unternehmen und Politik!". In: Betriebs-Berater, Vol. 59, 38, BB-Special 3/2004, Sept 20th. p. 1. ISSN 0340-7918. (in German)
- (2004) "Der Aufsichtsrat – ein Faktor des Kapitalmarktes?". Guest comment in: Der Aufsichtsrat, 02, Feb 15th 2004. p. 2. ISSN 1613-1282. (in German)
- (2004) "Investor Relations – Mittler zwischen der subjektiven und objektiven Seite des Kapitalmarktes – Standardisierung vs. Individualisierung der Information an die Kapitalmärkte". In: Küting, Karlheinz; Pfitzer, Norbert; Weber, Claus-Peter (eds.): Herausforderungen und Chancen durch weltweite Rechnungslegungsstandards – Kapitalmarktorientierte Rechnungslegung und integrierte Unternehmenssteuerung. Stuttgart: Schäffer-Poeschel Verlag. ISBN 9783791023441. (in German)
- (1994) "Integrationsmanagement von Akquisitionen und Fusionen". In: Eschenbach, Rolf (ed.): Externes Wachstum : Allianzen, Beteiligungen, Akquisitionen. Tagungsbericht. Vienna: Service Fachverlag an der Wirtschaftsuniversität Wien. ISBN 9783854282792. (in German)
- (1991) "Kriterien zur Ergänzung des Bestätigungsvermerks gem. § 322 Absatz 2 HGB", Dissertation Lüneburg University. Lüneburg. (in German)
