= Lakomaa =

Lakomaa is a Finnish surname. Notable people with the surname include:

- Aarne Lakomaa (1914–2001), Finnish aircraft designer
- Erik Lakomaa (born 1977), Swedish scholar and political consultant
