= Per Josefsson =

Per Josefsson (born May 15, 1959) is a Swedish investor, hedge fund manager and philanthropist. He is one of the founders and principal owners of Brummer&Partners, a leading European hedge fund manager with total assets under management 2016 in excess of 127 billion SEK. Brummer&Partners has offices in Stockholm, London, New York, Los Angeles, Singapore, Hong Kong and Dhaka.

Born in Borås, Josefsson graduated from the Stockholm School of Economics in Sweden. Before starting Brummer&Partners, Josefsson was global head of equities at the brokerage firm Alfred Berg. Currently he is the chief investment officer and the president of the hedge fund Carve, which he started in 2012. Carve is a subsidiary of Brummer&Partners. Beside his work, Josefsson has a great interest in art. He and his wife Lena Josefsson are members of the Museum of Modern Art International Council in New York. He is president of the Stockholm School of Economics Art Initiative and was on the board of the Royal Art College for many years. The Josefsson family foundation has made frequent donations of both money and artworks to the Modern Art Museum in Stockholm. Josefsson is a member of the board of Ernström & Co, Efva Attling AB, the foundation for the magazine Liberal Debate and a few internal boards at Brummer&Partners as well as the Advisory Board for Stockholm Philanthropy Symposium. He is also the founder and financier of Sweden's first audio-theatre Audiorama.
