= Student Association at the Stockholm School of Economics =

The Student Association at the Stockholm School of Economics
- Institution: Stockholm School of Economics
- Location: Sveavägen 65, Stockholm, Sweden
- Established: 1909
- Members: c. 2000
- Affiliations: Stockholm Federation of Student Unions
- Colors: purple
- Website: sasse.se

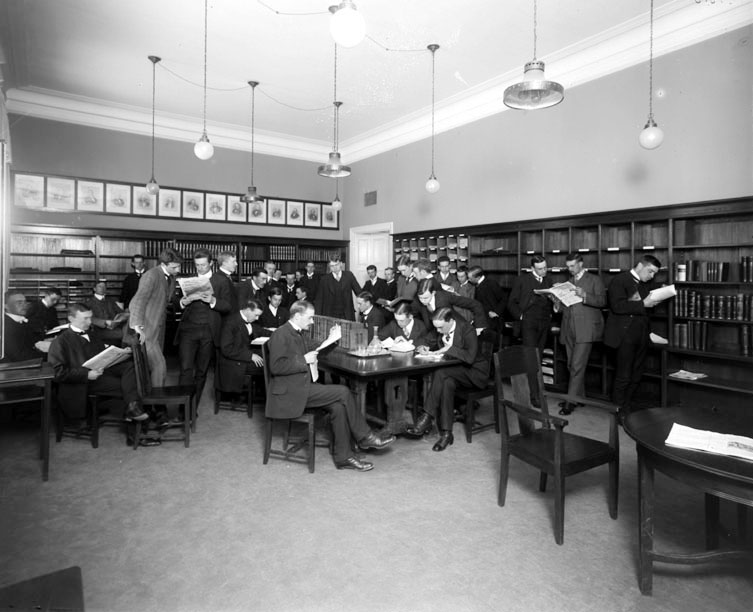
Students gathering in a common room at the Stockholm School of Economics at Brunkebergstorg 2, Stockholm (1911)

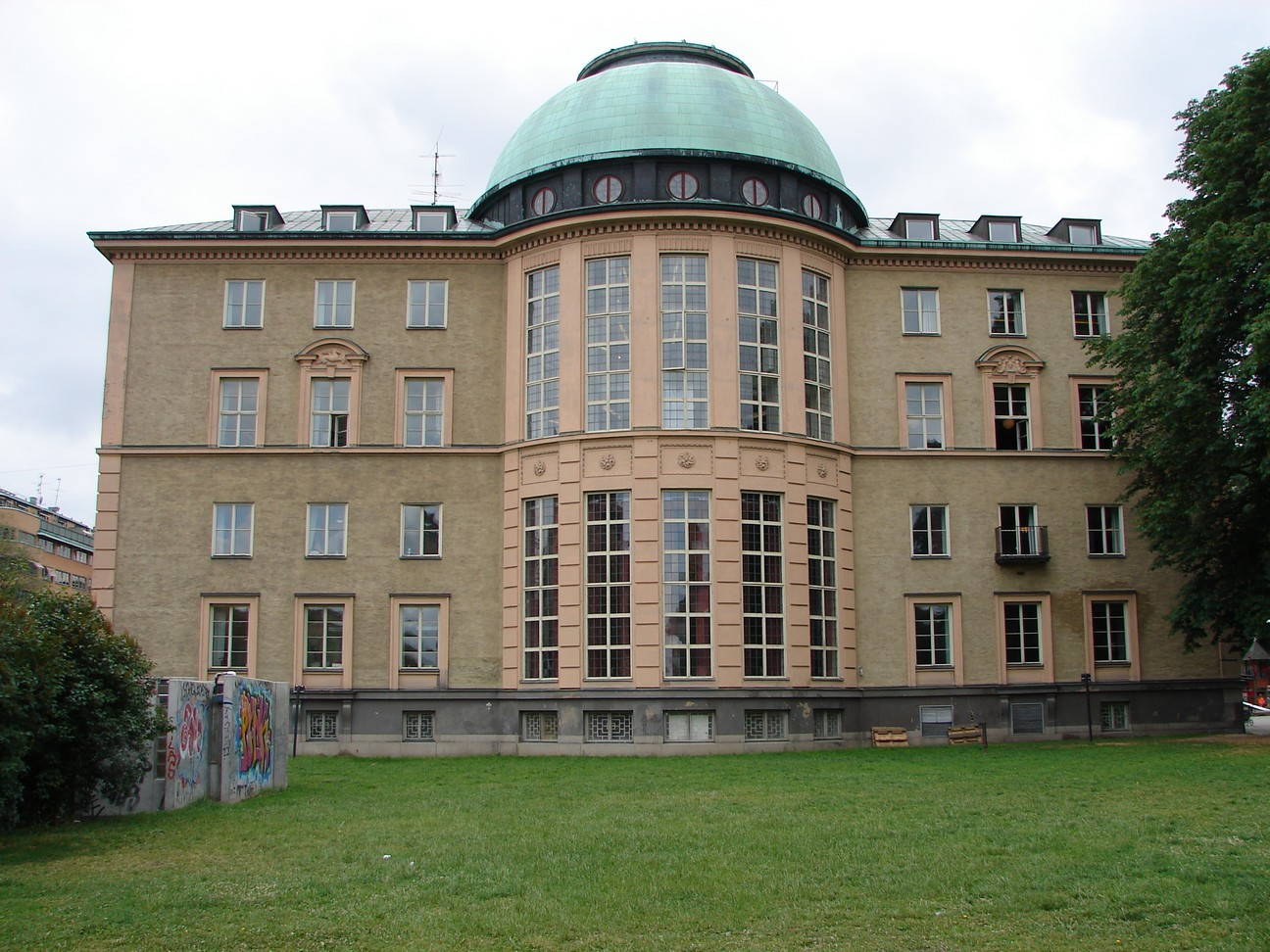
The Stockholm School of Economics' current main building at Sveavägen 65 in Stockholm, Sweden. The student association's offices is located below ground level in this building.

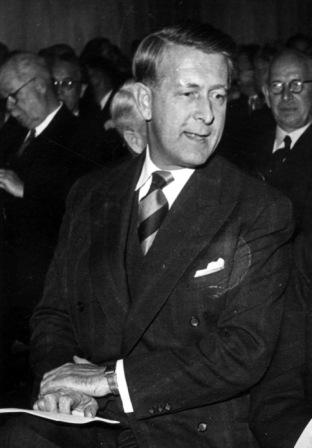
Bertil Ohlin, alumni of the SSE and member of the SASSE, professor of economics at the SSE (1929-1965), founded the Stockholm School together with prof. Gunnar Myrdal and invented the standard mathematical model of international free trade, the Heckscher–Ohlin model. He received the Nobel Prize in Economics 1977.

The Student Association at Stockholm School of Economics (SASSE, Swedish: Handelshögskolans i Stockholm studentkår; abbreviated HHSS) organizes all students enrolled at the Stockholm School of Economics (SSE). SSE is a leading European academic institution for education and research in the fields of economics, finance, corporate law, business, managerial sciences and marketing. It is situated in Stockholm, capital of Sweden. SASSE is affiliated with the Stockholm Federation of Student Unions.

== History ==
The Student Association at the Stockholm School of Economics (SASSE) was founded at the same time as the Stockholm School of Economics, in 1909. The Stockholm School of Economics was the first academic institution in Northern Europe specialized on economics, finance and business, and its student union is one of the oldest academic institutions' student unions in Sweden. The student union is known for its intense cooperation with the corporate sphere in Northern Europe and has numerous corporate sponsors, including SEB, Citigroup, Deloitte and Bain & Company.

The student association was originally situated in the school's building at Brunkebergstorg 2, in Norrmalm in central Stockholm. In 1926 the student association, as well as the school, moved to a new building by architect Ivar Tengbom at Sveavägen 65, the capital's central north-south axis, in Vasastaden, Stockholm.

Several of Sweden's and Northern Europe's leading political figures and businesspeople have been members of the SASSE. Among these are: Ruben Rausing, founder of the company Tetra Pak (the Rausing family is today one of the richest families in Britain), professor Bertil Ohlin (party leader for the leading opposition party in the Swedish parliament, the Liberal People's Party 1944-1967; inventor of the standard mathematical model of international free trade, the Heckscher-Ohlin model; awarded the Nobel Prize in Economics 1977) and Jan Carlzon (former chief executive officer of SAS Group).

See also the category Stockholm School of Economics alumni

== Committees ==
SASSE is organized into eight committees with different responsibilities. These are the Business Committee (NU), the Education Committee (UU), the Entertainment Committee (PU), the International Committee (IntU), the Tech Committee (TechU), the Media Committee (MedU), the Social Committee (SU) and the Sports Committee (IdU). Each committee is headed by a president, who is also a member of the board of the student association.

== Other projects ==
In addition to the committees of SASSE, there are various separate sub-organisations and independent projects. These include the Stockholm Student Investment Fund, Consulting Society, Handelsdagarna, Friedmans Apostlar (choir) and Handelsspexet.

As well as this, once every 4 years, SASSE hosts the Student Nobel Night Cap (SNNC). This is the afterparty following the Nobel Prize ceremony, whose host rotates between Karolinska Institutet, Stockholm University, SSE and KTH.

== See also ==
- Stockholm School of Economics
- Stockholm School of Economics Alumni Association
- Stockholm School of Economics in Riga
- Stockholm School of Economics Russia
