= Peter Wolodarski =

Swedish journalist (born 1978)

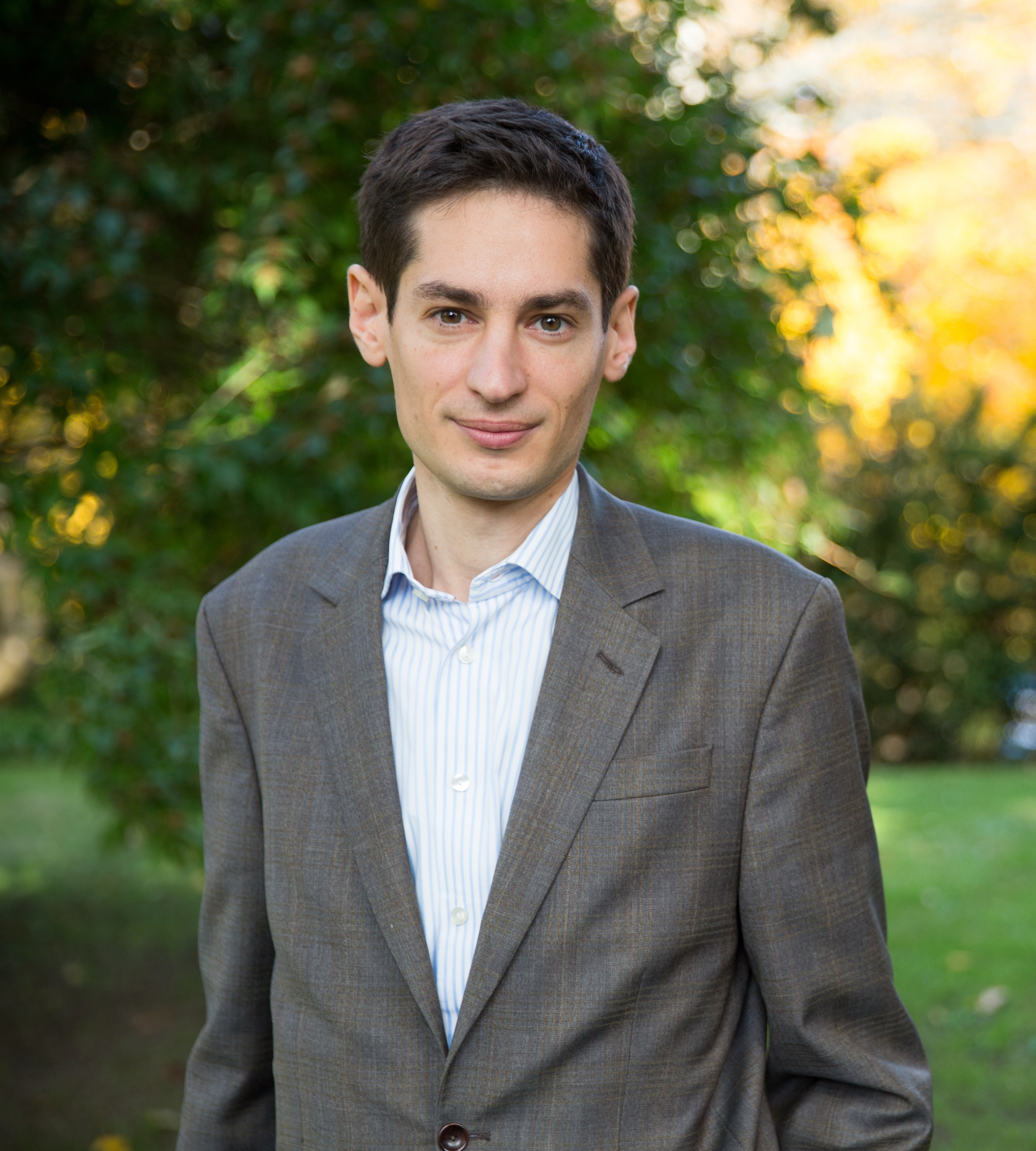
- Wolodarski in October 2015
- Born: 15 April 1978 (age 48); Stockholm, Sweden
- Occupations: Journalist, television host
- Spouse: Karin Grundberg Wolodarski

Peter Wolodarski (born 15 April 1978) is a Swedish journalist and television host. He has been the editor of the Stockholm-based Dagens Nyheter since 10 March 2013.

== Early life and family ==
Wolodarski was born in Stockholm in a Jewish family. His father, architect and town-planner Aleksander Wolodarski, emigrated to Sweden from Poland in the late 1960s. According to Wolodarski, his maternal grandmother Lusia was born in Równe, Poland, where her family escaped from Kiev after the Russian revolution. Lusia managed to survive in Warsaw during the Nazi occupation, but in 1968, during a state-orchestrated antisemitic campaign, she was forced to flee Poland for Germany.

== Career ==
Wolodarski started his journalistic career at the age of twelve, working as one of the cub reporters (a knattereporter) on the Swedish television programme Barnjournalen (Children's Journal). He studied business administration at the Stockholm School of Economics and in 1999, at age of twenty-one, started as an editorial writer on Expressen and as a TV host with Åke Ortmark on TV8.

Wolodarski has been writing editorials for Dagens Nyheter since 2001. He was appointed political editor 15 March 2009 and in January 2013 it was suggested he become editor-in-chief and formally took up the appointment of editor and legally accountable publisher (Swedish: ansvarig utgivare) on 10 March 2013. He has also hosted Studio 8 and Wolodarski on TV8 and has been on the editorial committee of Judisk Krönika (Sweden's Jewish Chronicle). He was granted a Nieman Fellowship at Harvard University (2008–09) where his studies included Russia's modern history.

In 2023, Bonnier News, through Dagens Nyheter, became majority owner of Hufvudstadsbladet, Västra Nyland, and Östnyland newspapers. Wolodarski became Chairman of the Board in the joint company.

== Other activities ==
- European Council on Foreign Relations (ECFR), Member

== Personal life ==
Wolodarski is married to the journalist Karin Grundberg Wolodarski.
