= Ortmark =

Ortmark is a Swedish surname. Notable people with the surname include:

- Åke Ortmark (1929–2018), Swedish journalist, author, and radio and television presenter
- Jacob Ortmark (born 1997), Swedish footballer
