= Richard Normann =

Swedish management consultant

Richard Normann (Finland, 1943 - Paris, November 18, 2003) was a Swedish management consultant and researcher early in the development of theories of service management, interactive strategy, and offerings.

== Biography ==
Normann received his MBA and then PhD in Business Economics in 1975 at Lund University, leading to a professorship. He was soon working at management consultancy Scandinavian Institutes of Administrative Research (SIAR) and was its president from 1976 to 1980. He was also a visiting professor at the Copenhagen Business School and visiting scholar at Harvard Business School. Being the founder of Service Management Group, SMG in 1980, he later also founded the strategy consulting firm NormannPartners that bear his conceptual legacy today.

Normann was the one who in the 1970s introduced the concept of mission. He was, among other things, strategy consultant for SAS when the airline in the 1980s, during Jan Carlzon CEO's time, developing the idea, together with Denis Boyle of "moments of truth" oriented toward business travelers and customers.

Green Templeton College, at Oxford University, honors his memory with the Annual Richard Normann Lecture.

In the introduction to Reframing Business, Henry Mintzberg cites Normann as a "significant scholar", "using the consulting opportunity to advance general scholarship, namely our understanding of how this world works".

== Publications ==
- 1984. Service Management. Chichester: John Wiley & Sons. [The seminal work.]
- 1989 (with Rafael Ramírez) “A Theory of the Offering: Toward a Neo-Industrial Business Strategy.” In Strategy Organisation Design, and Human Resource Management, ed. Charles C. Snow, 111–128. J.A.I. Press. .
- 1991 Service Management: Strategy and Leadership in Service Business
- 1993 (with Rafael Ramirez), "Designing Interactive Strategy", Harvard Business Review
- 1994 (with Solveig Wikström) Knowledge and Value: A New Perspective on Corporate Transformation
- 1998 (with Rafael Ramirez) Designing interactive strategy: from value chain to value constellation
- 2001 Reframing Business: When the Map Changes the Landscape
- 2006 (with Niklas Arvidsson), People as care catalysts: from being patient to becoming healthy
