= Fyndiq =

Swedish e-commerce company

- Company type: Private
- Industry: E-commerce
- Founder: Dinesh Nayar, Fredrik Norberg, Micael Widell, David Brudö, Dan Nilsson
- Headquarters: Stockholm, Sweden
- Key people: Dinesh Nayar (Founder)
- Products: Consumer goods
- Services: Online marketplace
- Website: fyndiq.se

Fyndiq is a Swedish e-commerce company founded by Dinesh Nayar in 2010 with the basic idea of being an online channel for Swedish traders to get rid of their residual stocks. Approximately 1,400 stores sell their goods, in categories such as beauty, mobile accessories, toys, electronics.

Fyndiq was founded by Dinesh Nayar, Fredrik Norberg, Micael Widell, David Brudö and Dan Nilsson.

Since the start in 2010, the company has taken in around 40 million in venture capital and the investors include Jan Carlzon.

== Timeline ==
- 2010 - 300 products on the site from 40 different stores
- 2011 - Fyndiq had a turnover of SEK 8.3 million
- 2012 - Fyndiq had a turnover of SEK 56 million
- 2013 - Fyndiq had a turnover of SEK 123 million, 100,000 products
- 2014 - 170,000 products
- 2015 - Over 400,000 products
- 2016 - Over 800,000 products

== Scam incident ==
A namesake app, which was an online scam platform that claims to reward its users daily. Which lured its users into performing daily tasks to earn a commission. However, to be eligible for these tasks, users needed to deposit some 25 USDT in their account, and the app used a Tron (TRC20) Binance wallet address for all their transactions. The app smartly changed its wallet address from time to time.

Later the company also posted on Facebook that there is an ongoing international investment scam using their name and logo and that Fyndiq is in no way associated with these attempted scams.
