= Kristian Ek =

Swedish football player

Personal information
- Date of birth: June 18, 1989 (age 37)
- Place of birth: Sundsvall, Sweden
- Height: 1.86 m (6 ft 1 in)
- Position: Defender

Team information
- Current team: GIF Sundsvall
- Number: 27

Youth career
- GIF Sundsvall

Senior career*
| Years | Team | Apps | (Gls) |
| 2008–present | GIF Sundsvall | 31 | (1) |
| 2009 | → Östersunds FK (loan) | 4 | (1) |
- * Club domestic league appearances and goals as of 1 August 2009

Kristian Ek (born 18 June 1989 in Sundsvall) is a Swedish football player currently playing for GIF Sundsvall. In March 2009 he was loaned out to Östersunds FK, who play in the Division 1 Norra, but after only a handful of games he was recalled to GIF Sundsvall. He's a defender. He is playing for the soccer team of the Stockholm School of Economics at the moment and led the team to the victory at the Euroesade 2013 in Barcelona.
