= Karin Pilsäter =

Swedish politician (born 1960)

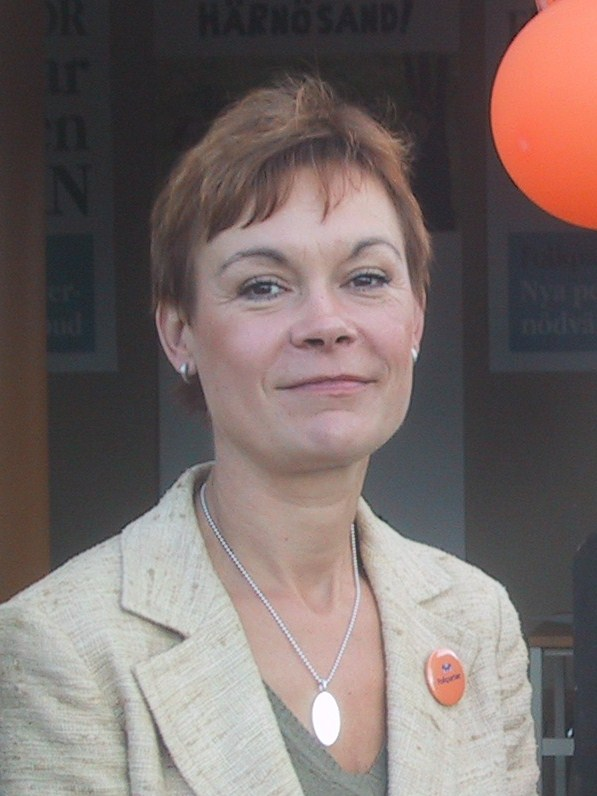

member of the Riksdag
- In office 1991–2010

Personal details
- Party: Liberal People's Party
- Education: Stockholm School of Economics

Anna Karin Pilsater (born 24 June 1960) is a Swedish politician with the Liberal People's Party. She is a former member of the Riksdag since 1991, representing Stockholm County, and was previously the party's spokesperson on economic policy.

Karin Pilsäter was born in Vantör in southern Stockholm. She studied at the Stockholm School of Economics 1984–1988. Before her involvement in politics she has worked as shop assistant, cashier, economic secretary, accountant and as economic chief.

She lives in Tullinge with her husband and their three children.
