= Stockholm School of Economics in Riga =

School in Riga, Latvia

Coordinates: 56°57′34″N 24°06′30″E

- Type: Private
- Established: 1994; 32 years ago
- Parent institution: Stockholm School of Economics
- Rector: Anders Paalzow
- Administrative staff: 38
- Students: 400
- Undergraduates: ~123
- Location: Riga, Latvia
- Campus: Urban
- Language: English
- Website: www.sseriga.edu

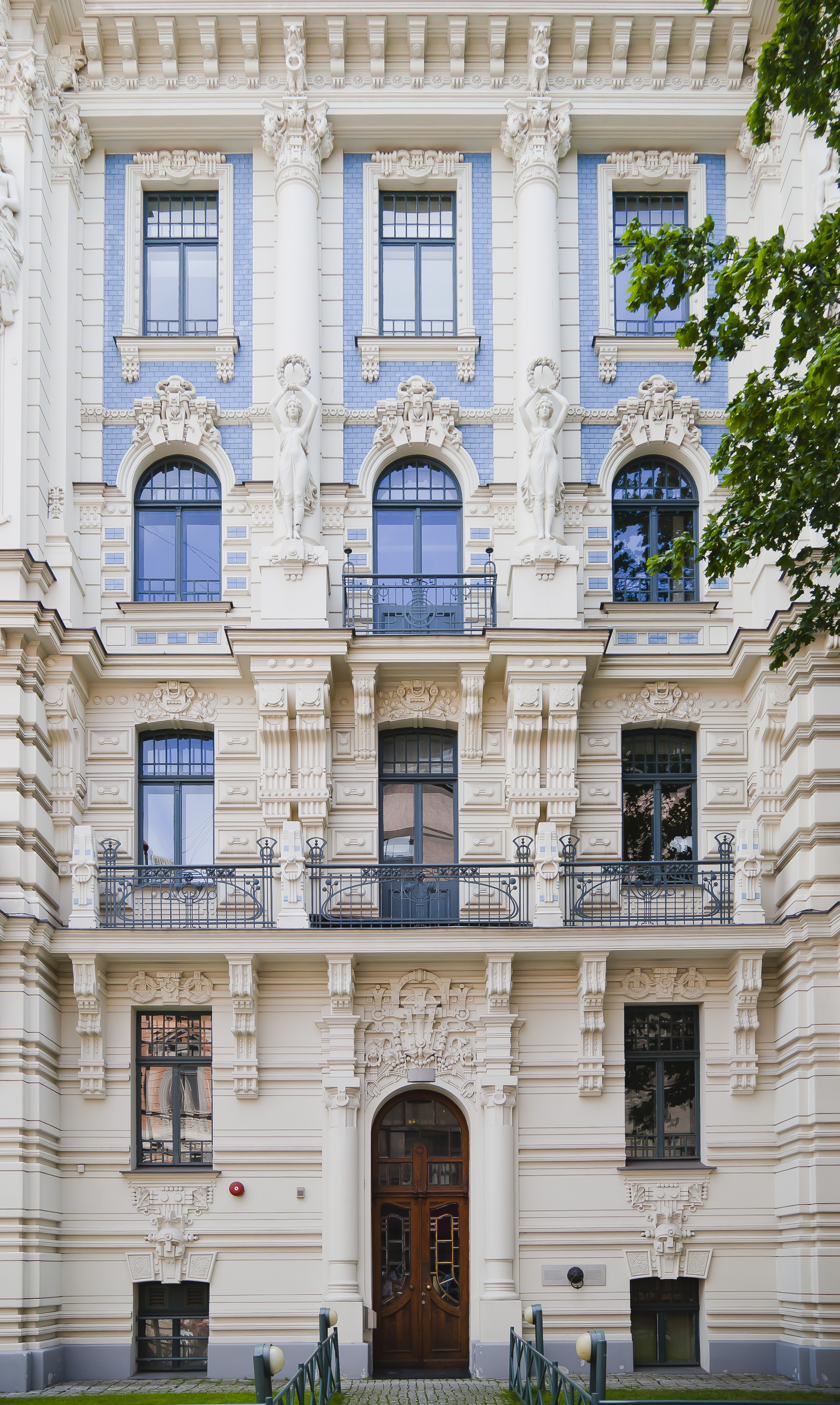
Main building on Strēlnieku Street.

The Stockholm School of Economics in Riga (SSE Riga or Latvian: Rīgas Ekonomikas augstskola) is a business school in Riga, Latvia. It is a subsidiary of the Stockholm School of Economics (SSE).

The school was founded in 1994 by the Stockholm School of Economics with the support of the Swedish government, and the Latvian Ministry of Education on behalf of Latvia.

Since 2010 SSE Riga is owned by a foundation established by the Stockholm School of Economics (SSE), the University of Latvia (LU) and the SSE Riga Alumni Association.

Given its relatively small size, the admittance to SSE Riga is reportedly highly selective. The school has a curriculum that is taught entirely in English. Together with its mother school, the Stockholm School of Economics, it has been consistently ranked as the top business school in Latvia and among the best ones in Europe. SSE Riga employs a variety of teaching methods, including group work, summer internships and case studies, and has exchange programs with many leading universities and business schools in Europe.

== Management ==
Anders Paalzow, Rector of SSE Riga, holds a Ph.D. in Economics from the Stockholm School of Economics. He has served as SSE Riga Rector since July, 1999.

== Degree programmes ==
SSE Riga offers two degree programmes: The three-year BSc in Economics and Business and the two-year Executive MBA programme. Both programmes are taught in English and a tuition fee is charged. The number of BSc alumni exceeds 2,550, and more than 400 have graduated from the Executive MBA programme.

=== BSc programme in economics and business ===
The SSE Riga Bachelor programme curriculum provides students with a selection of 30 core courses and 40 elective courses.

130 students every year are admitted to the Bachelor's programme. About 65% of the undergraduate students are from Latvia, and the remaining 35% from Lithuania, Estonia, Moldova, Ukraine, Belarus, Georgia, Russia and China. English is the language of instruction.

==== Admission Process ====
There are four key variables applicants have to complete in order to get admitted to the Stockholm School of Economics in Riga. These are:

- Application qualifying results
  - Minimum grades in Mathematics and English: 7 on a scale of 10, or equivalent on a comparable scale (State examination results in Mathematics and English are required for candidates who completed their secondary education starting from 2013 in Estonia, Latvia or Lithuania.)
- Motivation letter (part of application form)
- Admissions test (basic math, logical aptitude and English language topics)
- 40 minute interview with discussion of case study (for best applicants who passed the admissions test)

After online application forms are reviewed, applicants who have fulfilled the eligibility criteria are invited for the online SSE Riga Admissions Test. After the admissions test, the best performers are invited for a 40 minute interview.

=== Executive MBA ===
The school started a two-year Executive MBA program in 2002. Annual intakes of no more than 30 students come from a variety of academic and professional backgrounds. Study tour to Asia is among the highlights of the programme. Entrance requirements: University degree (or equivalent to University degree), work experience (minimum 5 years) and professional achievements.

=== Exchange ===
SSE Riga maintains contact with prestigious partner universities in Europe. Each semester exchange students are invited to the SSE Riga Bachelor programme, and each autumn third year SSE Riga students leave for exchange for one semester. Some of the exchange partners of the school include Sciences Po Paris, Bocconi University, WHU Otto Beisheim School of Management, Technical University of Munich, Universitat Pompeu Fabra, Warsaw School of Economics, Norwegian School of Economics, Vilnius University, Utrecht University and many others.

== International ranking ==
Financial Times European Business school ranking 2022 has ranked Stockholm School of Economics as the 20th best business university in Europe, making it the No. 1 business school in the Baltic/Nordic region The Stockholm School of Economics Master in Finance has been ranked as the 19th best in the world.

SSE Riga is ranked together with its 'mother', the Stockholm School of Economics (SSE).

== Executive education ==
In addition to the degree programmes, the school offers a number of Executive Education programmes including open and in-house programmes. Open programme portfolio comprises over a dozen programmes. Areas covered include general management and leadership, finance and accounting, strategy and project management, marketing and communication etc.

== Centres for studies and research ==
In the field of research SSE Riga cooperates with the Baltic International Centre for Economic Policy Studies (BICEPS), which is an independent research institute undertaking high quality policy-oriented research in economics and other social sciences. The Centre for Media Studies at SSE Riga was founded in 2009, which provides further education for journalists in the fields of investigative reporting, business reporting, and journalistic ethics. To raise the awareness of sustainable business practices and corporate social responsibility, the Centre for Sustainable Business was founded in 2012. The school also participates in various EU and government-funded research and policy-oriented projects as well as in the preparation of research reports.

== Library ==
The School's library collection holds more than 25,000 books covering the main disciplines of business and economics and is open to the public.

== Campus ==
The School's main building, erected in 1905–06, is located on Strelnieku iela 4a in Riga's Jugendstil/Art Nouveau district. The district is listed as a UNESCO World Heritage. The Stockholm School of Economics in Riga building was designed by Mikhail Eisenstein (1867–1920). When the School started operations in 1994, the King of Sweden Carl XVI Gustaf opened the renovated Art Nouveau building.

In 1993 The Soros Higher Education Support Program contributed US$2 million to the renovation of the main building.

== The student association ==
The Student Association of the Stockholm School of Economics in Riga (the SA) is the main representative body of all SSE Riga (Latvian: Rīgas Ekonomikas augstskola) students. The SA is a member of the Student Union of Latvia.

== History ==
Stockholm School of Economics in Riga Student Association was founded in 1994, the same year as SSE Riga. From the beginning of its foundation, the SA of SSE Riga was one of the most efficient student associations in Latvia. Almost each student was helping the SA of SSE Riga on a daily basis, as well as during major events. Traditionally, the SA has one of the highest ratio of students involved in Latvia, with about 80% of students taking part in the SA activities during their time in SSE Riga.

=== Board members ===
==== President ====
The President of the Student Association is in charge of the strategic planning, overall vision and budgeting of the association. Likewise, conducting Board Meetings, collaborating with SSE Riga Administration, Alumni Association and SASSE are also included among the duties of the President. Being the representative of the SSE Riga students, the President takes full responsibility for the SA's activities and leads the association to improve students’ experience at the school and strengthen the connection between the administration and students.

==== Vice president ====
The main purpose of the Vice-president is to assist the President and foster the development of the Student Association's board. The duties of the Vice-president include to motivating the board members for common goal and measure the performance of the board, and conduct personal meetings with each chairperson separately. In a case of an emergency, the Vice-president has to replace the President and take its responsibilities.

==== Chief accountant ====
Chief accountant is a part of the Student Association board, whose main responsibilities include taking care of timely payments, collecting invoices, checks and other documents. The accountant also provides information to the organizations and SA about available financial resources. Additionally, this person is responsible for contacting legal authorities such as State Revenue Service (VID) and Register of Enterprises.

==== Alumni coordinator ====
The Alumni Coordinator is the person who connects the Alumni Association and the Student Association. The Coordinator shares the information between current students and the Alumni, thus making sure both parties get the latest news regarding projects and events within the university. Additionally, the Coordinator contributes to the organizing process of guest lecture by contacting the Alumni and handling their involvement.

=== Committees ===
==== The business committee ====
Delivering financial resources in order to improve SSE Riga students’ life beyond the academia is the main responsibility of the Business Committee. Additionally, the committee ensures collaboration with partners by attending meetings and attracting new sponsors.

==== The public relations committee ====
The Public Relations Committee manages the public image, appearance, and the latest information of the Student Association. Its goal is to create awareness of the Student Association and SSE Riga brand. Thus, handling the visualizations for the events, presentations and projects and providing support for other committees or organizations is the main duty. Furthermore, other responsibilities of the PR Committee include maintaining the social media presence of the SA and creating annual Fashion Collection of SSE Riga.

==== The education committee ====
The mission of the Education Committee is to improve the studying experience and the education quality of SSE Riga. Collecting feedback about courses, organizing informative guest-lectures, managing Mentorship program, maintaining Internship Database and Student Material Storage are just a few of committee's responsibilities. Its task is to connect and maintain the communication between the school's administration and the students. Every month, on Advisory Board Meetings, the chairperson of the committee helps administration to improve strategies about teaching and learning.

==== The information committee ====
The Information Committee deals with the administration of the internal information flow. Its main functions are providing students with the latest news and increasing the visibility of the SA activities through mass-media. Moreover, the Information Committee administers the Yearbook development process and ensures that the Newcomers’ Guide contains all the essential tips for Year 1s.

==== The IT committee ====
IT committee provides technical support and IT solutions to the students, the SA and other organizations.

==== The event committee ====
Starting with the Newcomers camp and ending with the Graduation ceremony, all major celebrations are organized by the Event Committee.

==== The sports committee ====
The Sports Committee offers students a variety of activities and events. The Sports Committee provides the opportunity for students to participate in weekly swimming, volleyball, floorball, football and basketball practices.

== SSE Riga Debate Society ==
SSE Riga Debate Society is one of the oldest student organizations in SSE Riga and the oldest debate society in the Baltics. It was established in 1994, the same year the school was founded.

Since 1998 the Society has been organizing an annual debate championship called SSE Riga IV, which is the oldest, largest, and most prestigious tournament in Central Europe. The latest tournament gathered around 130 participants from 11 countries.

Aside from activities related to competitive debating, the Society also organizes various public debates, show debates, public speaking and presentation skills trainings, and other educational activities.

== Investment Game ==
Investment Game is an international stock market simulator, founded in 1997 by the student investment fund at the Stockholm School of Economics in Riga. The simulation's goal is to stimulate public's interest in finance and investment as well as to train the society to invest by providing virtual portfolios. Every year it unites more than 6000 individuals interested in investment, and is claimed to be the biggest event of its kind in the Baltic region. The first round of the Investment Game, which lasts for 4 weeks, offers players to develop their skills by trading on 15 European markets, ETFs, ETNs and financial derivatives. The competition offers to trade NASDAQ OMX Helsinki, NASDAQ OMX Stockholm, Russian Trading System, NASDAQ OMX Riga, NASDAQ OMX Tallinn, NASDAQ OMX Vilnius and many others. The second round, which also lasts for 4 weeks, is more advanced – Investment Game ‘12 provides access to international stock markets via trading platform. The contest allows trading on 15 international markets with equities, commodities and other financial instruments.

The Investment Game lasts for two months from March to the beginning of May, when most successful participants are awarded prizes.

Chas has stated that the Investment Game is a very exciting activity and one of the most challenging at the school.

== See also ==
- Stockholm School of Economics
- Student Association at the Stockholm School of Economics
- List of universities in Latvia
- Stockholm School of Economics Russia
- List of business schools in Europe
