= Eric Rhenman =

Swedish professor

Eric Rhenman (1932–1993) was a business professor at Stockholm School of Economics and Lund University (1967–1976) in Sweden, and a guest professor at Harvard (1974–1976). He was named a Professor of Business Administration at Lund in 1967. He was offered a chair at Harvard, which he declined in order to focus on consulting at the Scandinavian Institutes of Administrative Research (SIAR).

Rhenman, together with four other academic researchers at the Stockholm School of Economics, founded the Scandinavian Institutes for Administrative Research (SIAR) in 1966, which functioned as a research institute until 1971, but was then transformed into a combined consulting company and research institute.

Among other work, Rhenman is known for his research on the gap between scholarly research on management and the perceived lack of relevance and actual application of that research to the real world. Also, Rhenman's work on stakeholders in management structures was very influential in Sweden, and considered the foundation of the "Swedish model."
