= Charlotte Strömberg =

Swedish corporate leader

Charlotte Strömberg (born 1959) is a Swedish corporate leader. She has been CEO for the Jones Lang LaSalle Incorporated and is chairman of the board for the real estate company Castellum. Strömberg is a civilekonom (Master of Business Administration).

== Early life and education ==
Strömberg was born in Stockholm and grew up in Sunne and Hässleholm. Both her parents were jurists. Growing up she worked extra on a number of jobs such as vendor, orderly, security guard and swimming instructor. She has an MBA from the Stockholm School of Economics. She has also made discontinued research in financial economics.

== Career ==
Strömberg commenced her career as a teacher in cost and benefit analysis at the Institute for Corporate Leadership (Institutet för företagsledning, IFL) within the Stockholm School of Economics. She went on to become a financial analyst at investment managers Swedbank Robur and after that she worked for Alfred Berg as an analyst and adviser in the area of corporate finance. In 1997, Strömberg transferred to the Carnegie Investment Bank where she worked as head of the Nordic branch of investment banking. In 2006, she became CEO for the Nordic section of Jones Lang LaSalle Incorporated, an investment management company specializing in real estate. In 2011, she stepped down as CEO for LaSalle and continued as member of the board at the company.

== Boards ==
Strömberg's first board appointment was at the fashion company GANT in 2005–07. She is a board member of the Castellum real estate company, Swedish Boomerang clothing company, Fourth AP pension fund, Intrum Justitia collection agency, Karolinska Institutet, Skanska, and Ratos. Up until the annual general meeting in 2014, she was also a member of the Swedbank board.

In February 2015, she was ranked as the most powerful female board member in Sweden by business journal Veckans Affärer.

== Personal life ==
Strömberg is married and has two children.
