= Henrik Ekelund =

Swedish businessman

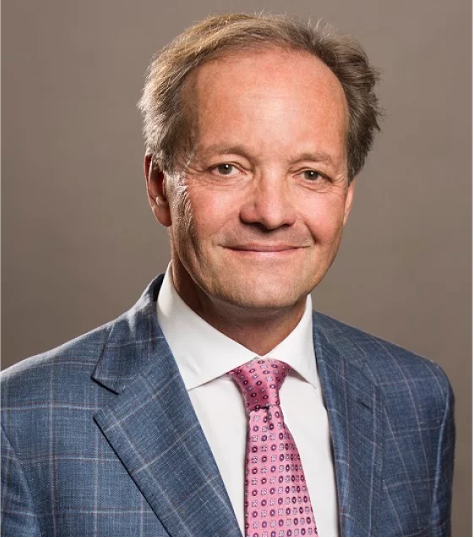
- Ekelund in 2017
- Citizenship: Swedish
- Education: Stockholm School of Economics

Henrik Ekelund is a Swedish entrepreneur, investor and author. He is the founder and chairman of BTS Group AB, a global consultancy firm, and served as its chief executive from its founding in 1986 until 2022. He has also written about economic growth, inflation and trade policy.

== Education ==
Henrik Ekelund graduated from the Stockholm School of Economics in 1978.

== Career ==
Prior to founding BTS Group, Ekelund worked as a management consultant at Vector Utveckling and Nordic Management. Between 1979 and 1981, Ekelund also served as the editor of Svensk Linje, the political magazine of the Confederation of Swedish Conservative and Liberal Students.

Ekelund founded BTS in 1986. The company was listed on the Stockholm Stock Exchange in 2001 and expanded internationally under his leadership. In 2010, he received the Albert Bonnier award for entrepreneur of the year. In 2022, after 36 years as chief executive, Ekelund stepped down as CEO and became chairman of BTS Group.

== Writing and media ==
Ekelund has been a regular writer on economic growth, inflation and trade policy. In commentary on US economic policy, he has argued that higher tariffs, increased budget deficits and restrictions on immigration risk increasing inflation and slowing economic growth.

In a 2025 essay published by Timbro, Ekelund discussed the relationship between economic growth, investment and innovation, arguing that these are important factors in improving living standards.

Ekelund is the author of How Nations Win: Creating Prosperity through Freedom, Order, and Innovation, scheduled for publication by Matt Holt Books on 2 March 2027. The book examines factors contributing to differences in economic growth and prosperity between countries.

He also appears in the 2026 documentary Why Nations Prosper: A Personal Exploration by Henrik Ekelund, produced by Free To Choose Media. The film examines factors associated with economic prosperity in different countries.
