= Jacob de Geer =

Swedish entrepreneur (born 1975)

- Born: Jacob Louis de Geer; 1975 (age 50–51)
- Education: Stockholm School of Economics
- Occupations: Investor; Entrepreneur
- Known for: Founder of Zettle

Jacob Louis de Geer (born August 1975) is a Swedish entrepreneur. He is best known as the co-founder and CEO of financial technology company Zettle.

== Early life and education ==
De Geer grew up in Stora Wäsby Castle in Upplands Väsby, Sweden. His father, Carl de Geer, was a banker and his mother Christina worked as a teacher.

De Geer graduated with a Master of Science in Business Administration from the Stockholm School of Economics in 1999.

== Career ==
In 1999, de Geer became the first employee of TradeDoubler, a digital marketing company founded by Martin Lorentzon.

In 2007, de Geer left TradeDoubler and co-founded a media agency, Tre Kronor, and film sharing service, Ameibo. He sold both companies in 2010.

In 2010, de Geer co-founded financial technology company Zettle, a producer of mini chip card readers and software for mobile devices. He came up with the idea for Zettle after his ex-wife, a sunglasses importer, lost out on business at a trade fair after being unable to process card payments for customers.

In 2018, de Geer sold Zettle to PayPal for $2.2 billion. De Geer continues to operate as Zettle's CEO in their head office in Stockholm, Sweden.
