= Scandinavian Institutes of Administrative Research =

Swedish consulting company and research institute

Scandinavian Institutes for Administrative Research (SIAR) was a Swedish consulting company and research institute founded by the late Professor Eric Rhenman in the mid-1960s. From 1966 to 1971 SIAR was a research institute. During the 1970s the profile was changed, so that it became the leading Swedish consulting company throughout the 1970s with some ten offices around the world. The institute developed a method for organization development, based on a strong theoretical foundation that was inspired by American researchers such as Herbert Simon, Philip Selznick and James D. Thompson.

The SIAR school of management described strategy development and long range planning as a problem-solving and decision-making process. Later, inspired by among others, Professors Chris Argyris and Donald Schon, Eric Rhenman, and other leading researchers and consultants at SIAR, contributed to the development of the theories of organizational learning.

Several prominent researchers from the United States visited SIAR, often on year-long guest research assignments. Among these were Walter F. Buckley, Alvin Zander, Larry Benningson, Larry Greiner, Jay Lorsch and Chris Argyris.

Eric Rhenman was a guest professor at Harvard Business School 1974–76, later one more of the leaders at SIAR, Richard Normann, enjoyed a similar position.

In 1991 SIAR was merged with the French consulting firm Bossard, which made the new company SIAR-Bossard into one of the 30 largest consulting companies in the world. SIAR-Bossard was acquired by Capgemini in 1997, and was merged with the Cap Gemini subsidiary Gemini Consulting.

== Leading ideas ==
The leading ideas of the SIAR School of Management,):

- Company problems result from change processes, particularly in the organization's environment, which the organization has not been able to adapt to.
- Environmental changes can be grouped into reversible variations and structural (permanent) changes.
- Structural changes in the environment require re-structuring of the company's organization, while variations can be met within existing organizational structures.
- The early theoretical developments of the SIAR School of Management can be summarized as “a theoretical view of how companies can handle structural change.”
- The most important task of management is to identify structural change and solve the problems and take advantage of the opportunities created by the changes.
