= Karl Gustaf Scherman =

Swedish economist

- Born: August 30, 1938 (age 88)

Academic background
- Education: KTH Royal Institute of Technology (MEng); Stockholm School of Economics (MBA)

Academic work
- Discipline: Economics
- Institutions: Swedish Social Insurance Agency

Karl Gustaf Scherman (born August 30, 1938) is a Swedish economist and government official. He obtained degrees of Master of Engineering from the KTH Royal Institute of Technology in Stockholm and as Master of Business Administration from the Stockholm School of Economics.

Between 1981 and 1986 he served as the general director of the Swedish Social Insurance Agency. During his tenure, the retirement age was raised to 65. From 1993 to 1998, he was president of the International Social Security Association. From 1976 to 1978, he was Secretary of State of the Swedish Ministry of Housing.
