= Micael Dahlén =

Swedish author (born 1973)

Micael Dahlen
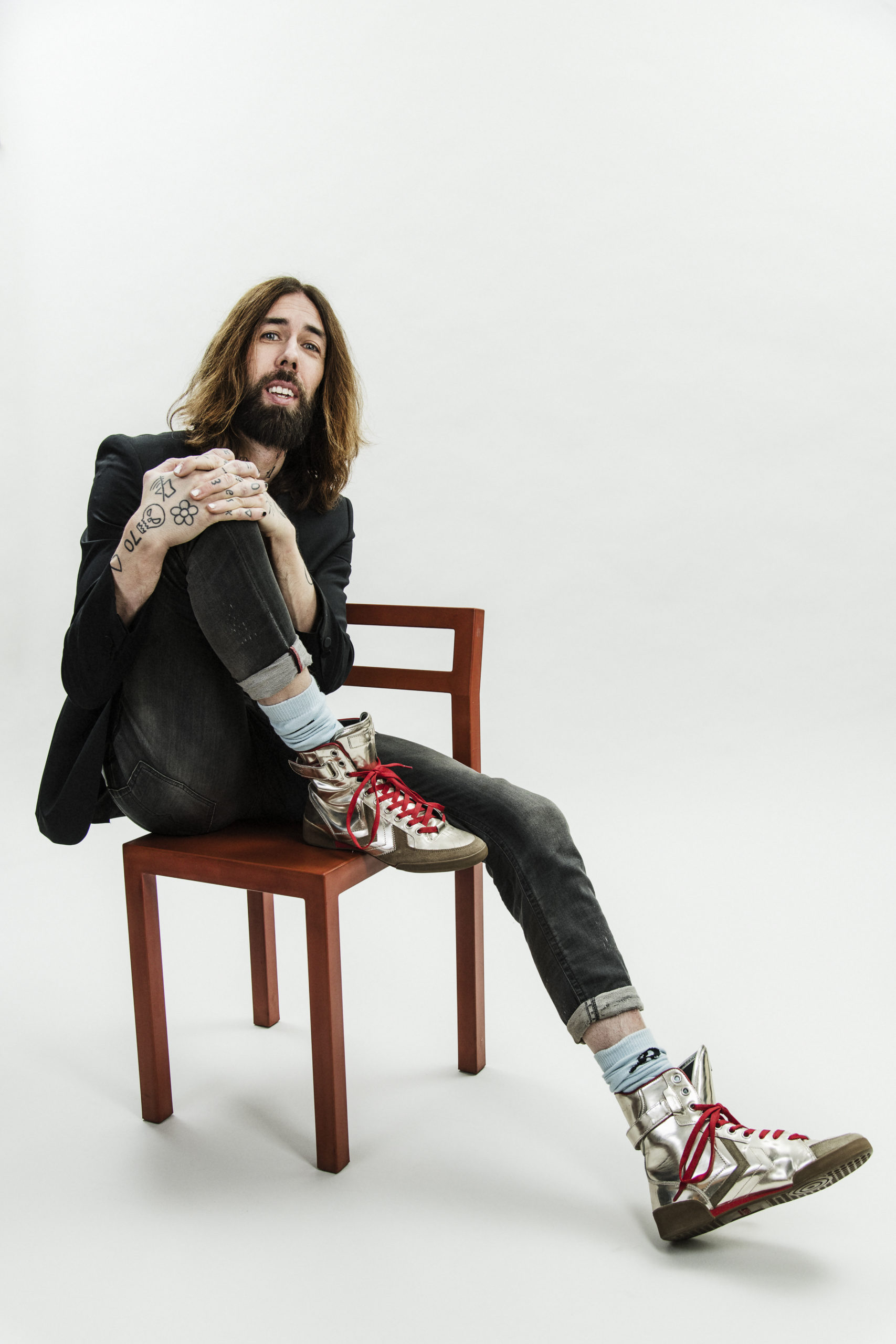
- Micael Dahlen, 2020
- Born: 18 June 1973 (age 53); Stockholm, Sweden
- Occupations: Educator, author, speaker
- Employer: Stockholm School of Economics
- Known for: Professor at Stockholm School of Economics, author
- Website: www.micaeldahlen.com

Micael Dahlen (born 18 June 1973) is a Swedish author, public speaker and professor of wellbeing, welfare, and happiness at the Stockholm School of Economics, Sweden. His research focusses on marketing, creativity and consumer behaviour and has been published in four books and numerous journal articles. The rights to his books have been sold in the US, UK, Germany, South Korea, Russia and Brazil.

== Academic career ==
Dahlen earned his PhD in 2001 from the Economic Research Institute at Stockholm School of Economics. Dahlens PhD thesis, "Marketing on the Web: empirical studies of advertising and promotion effectiveness", challenged the traditional logic of Web advertising and suggested that Internet marketing could be much more effective if designed and evaluated differently. As a researcher, Dahlen rose rapidly to take up a leading position in the field of consumer behavior, creativity and marketing. Only 34 years old, he was made professor. In the same year, 2008, Journal of Advertising ranked Dahlen as number 10 in the world among researchers within the field of advertising. Dahlen has also established the full-semester specialization course called Marketing Communication XL at Stockholm School of Economics. Since Stockholm School of Economics launched the Center for Wellbeing, Welfare and Happiness his title is professor of wellbeing, welfare, and happiness.

== Writing ==
Dahlen has written six books on varied topics such as marketing, happiness, serial-killers and social media which have also been translated into other languages.

Creativity Unlimited: Thinking Inside the Box for Business Innovations

In the book "Creativity Unlimited: Thinking Inside the Box for Business Innovations" he claimed 'thinking outside the box' was not necessary for creativity and instead propounded one needs rethink the way they look 'inside the box' to be creative. The book independent acclaim for "demystifying the process of creativity".

Nextopia

In the book "Nextopia" Dahlen states that we live in an expectation society, a society where we are constantly striving towards our next job, the next big thing, the next date. We are striving towards a Nextopia that holds the promise that our greatest pleasures and adventures lie ahead. With a set of ideas and theories about sex, drugs and rock 'n roll as natural expressions of human nature, Dahlen explains how this change in society and human mind impacts companies' and their ways of working, as well as how it impacts us as individuals.

Monster

In his book "Monster" Dahlen chose a topic differing from his previous work: Serial-killers and the human fascination for evil. Dahlen travelled across the globe to interview famous murderers, such as Charles Manson and the Japanese cannibal Issei Sagawa. The goal was to answer the question of how killing another person can make someone an international superstar, admired by millions? Dahlen also conducted several studies of his own on, i.e. how people perceive murderers and how many murders, fictional or real, that a person is exposed to on an average day. Dahlen also coined the term "Mansonomics" to describe how people, not only the murderers themselves, profit from these horrible acts.

Happiness Made Easy and What's the Point

These books were translated from Swedish to English in 2022. They are based on what Dahlen learned about happiness and "the meaning of life" from his research. These findings based on scientific studies were published as books with specific advice for the reader.

More.Numbers. Every. Day. How Figures Are Taking Over Our Lives – And Why It's Time to Set Ourselves Free.

Co-authored with behavioural economist Helge Thorbjørnsen, the research based book speaks of a current "numberdemic" which shows the ways where numbers affect human life in negative ways.

== Podcast ==
Dahlen has produced and hosted the international podcast Curious with Micael Dahlen for Audible.

== Other work ==
Micael is a popular international speaker. He also held performance lectures about happiness in 2019 on The Royal Dramatic Theatre in Stockholm based on his research and directed by Jenny Andreasson, also featuring actor Johan Ulveson and the pianist Göran Martling.

== Bibliography ==
- Dahlen, Micael (2009). Nextopia: Livet, lyckan och pengarna i förväntningssamhället (in Swedish). Volante. ISBN 9789049105846.
- Dahlen, Micael (2009). Creativity Unlimited: Thinking Inside the Box for Business Innovation. Wiley. ISBN 9780470770849.
- Dahlen, Micael; Lange, Fredrik; Smith, Terry (2010). Marketing Communications: A Brand Narrative Approach. Wiley. ISBN 9780470319925.
- Dahlen, Micael (2011). Monster (in Swedish). Volante. ISBN 9789186815660.
- Dahlen, Micael (2022). Happiness Made Easy: The Science-based Steps to Feel Just a Bit Better. Volante. ISBN 9789179652715.
- Dahlen, Micael (2022). What's the Point: How to Find Meaning in Your Life. Volante. ISBN 9789179651930.
- Dahlen, Micael; Thorbjørnsen, Helge (2023). More. Numbers. Every. Day. How Figures Are Taking Over Our Lives - And Why It's Time to Set Ourselves Free. Octopus Publishing Group. ISBN 9781800961043.
