= BTS Group =

Swedish consulting firm

- Company type: Public (Aktiebolag)
- Traded as: Nasdaq Stockholm: BTS B
- Industry: Professional Services
- Founded: 1986; 40 years ago as Business Training Systems AB
- Founder: Henrik Ekelund
- Headquarters: Stockholm, Sweden
- Number of locations: 44 (2026)
- Area served: Worldwide
- Key people: Henrik Ekelund (Chairman of the Board of Directors); Jessica Skon (CEO)Stefan Brown (CFO and Vice President)
- Services: Consulting
- Website: Official website

BTS Group AB (BTS) is a strategic consulting firm founded in 1986. The company serves banking, biotech and pharmaceutical, consumer products, insurance, manufacturing, oil and gas, professional services, retail, technology, and telecommunications sectors.

Headquartered in Stockholm, Sweden, the firm has over 600 employees across 34 global offices. The company's client base is spread across 53 countries and includes 60 of the U.S. Fortune 100 and over 30 of the Global Fortune 100.

BTS is a public company listed on the NASDAQ-OMX Stockholm trading under the symbol BTS B.

== History ==
BTS was founded in 1986 by Henrik Ekelund, former President and Chief Executive Officer, with the support of three investors from one of Scandinavia’s prominent strategic consulting firms. The initials originally stood for Business Training Systems.

In February 2005, BTS acquired Strategic Management Group, Inc. (SMG). In September 2006, BTS acquired The Real Learning Company (RLC) and Advantage Performance Group, Inc. (APG).

In July 2013, BTS acquired Wizer A/S to expand the firm's digital capabilities.

In October 2014, BTS acquired Fenestra Inc., a global provider of assessment and leadership development services.

In March 2015, BTS acquired AVO Vision, a South African-based company focused on corporate learning and development as well as community-worksite education.

In 2016, BTS Group acquired Cesim Italia Srl and Design Innovation Srl based in Milan, Italy.
