= Jerker Johansson =

Swedish banker (born 1956)

Jerker Mats Johansson
- Born: May 19, 1956 (age 70); Sweden
- Occupations: Former Chairman and Chief Executive Officer of the UBS Investment Bank and member of the Group Executive Board of UBS AG

Jerker Mats Johansson (born May 19, 1956) is a Swedish investment banker and was the chief executive officer of UBS Investment Bank and member of the Group Executive Board at UBS AG between February 13, 2008, and April 27, 2009.

== Biography ==
Johansson received a master's degree in economics from the Stockholm School of Economics in 1979 and an MBA from the Stanford University Graduate School of Business in 1986. During this time, he was part of Bankers Trust's graduate training program and worked for Chase Manhattan Bank.

He later went to work at Morgan Stanley Europe and became a vice chairman and member of their management committee. Johansson joined Morgan Stanley as a summer associate in 1985.

From 2002 to 2005, Johansson was the global head of institutional equities at Morgan Stanley Europe. In August 2005, he was named co-head of combined sales and trading, consisting of the Institutional Equity Division and the Fixed Income Division. From April 2007, he was co-head of sales and trading with responsibility for clients and services, prime brokerage and solely responsible for sales and trading in capital markets.

In February 2008, Johansson was appointed chairman and chief executive officer of UBS Investment Bank. He also serves as a member of the UBS AG group executive board.

On 27 April 2009, Johansson resigned and was replaced by Alex Wilmot-Sitwell and Carsten Kengeter as Co-CEOs of the Investment Bank. UBS Chief Executive Oswald J. Grübel issued a statement thanking Johansson “for his great efforts and his valuable contribution to the repositioning of our investment bank.”

Johansson co-founded Bluewater (previously Blue Water Energy) in 2011. As executive chairman, Johansson works alongside the other co-founding partners to drive the continued growth of the firm and the value creation across the funds Bluewater manage. Johansson's specific responsibilities include chairing the Investment Committee, Quarterly Portfolio Reviews and the Bluewater charitable giving committee. Johansson also maintains an active role across all elements of Bluewater including the deal team, finance team and the Marketing & IR team.

== Activities ==
Johansson now serves on the boards of Influit, Stena International S.A., Stena Fastigheter and FAM AB – part of The Wallenberg Foundations – and is a trustee of The Morgan Library and Museum. Jerker is also a member of The Royal Swedish Academy of Engineering Sciences.
