= Mette Morsing =

Danish academic that specialises on sustainable management

Professor Mette Morsing
- Born: Denmark
- Occupations: Academic, writer, dean

Academic background
- Education: Copenhagen Business School

Academic work
- Sub-discipline: Organizational communication, identity, and governance within corporate social responsibility
- Institutions: Saïd Business School, formerly Stockholm School of Economics
- Main interests: Sustainable management

Mette Morsing is a Danish academic. Her areas of expertise are sustainable management, organisational communication, identity, and governance in the context of corporate social responsibility. In September 2025, she was appointed Interim Dean of the Saïd Business School.

== Early life ==
Mette Morsing was born in Denmark in 1963. She studied International Business in Copenhagen Business School. Her 1990 thesis was awarded the Schöbel & Marholt Prize. In 1994, she received the Tietgen Gold Medal for her doctoral thesis on business ethics in organizational identity.

== Career ==
Since 2007 she has been a professor at her alma mater.

Morsing is a member of several international boards and councils, including RSM Rotterdam School of Management, King's College London, Sasin School of Management, RRBM Research for Responsible Research for Business and Management (USA), and Boards Impact Forum (Sweden). Morsing also is an editorial member of several high profile international academic journals.

In 2002–2012 Morsing was Professor and Founding Director of CBS Centre for Corporate Social Responsibility at Copenhagen Business School. In 2017–2020, she was Professor and Mistra Chair of Sustainable Markets and Executive Director of the Misum Center at Stockholm School of Economics.

In 2020–23 Morsing was the Head of the Principles of Responsible Management Education (PRME), UN Global Compact, in New York City. In this role, she managed the UN's largest initiative on responsible management education in collaboration with more than 800 business schools and universities. In September 2023, she assumed the role of Professor of Business Sustainability and Director of the Smith School of Enterprise and the Environment at Oxford University.

Morsing's publications had received over 3,000 scientific citations by 2016.

In September 2025 she was appointed Interim Dean of the Saïd Business School replacing Soumitra Dutta, who resigned over harassment accusations by a female colleague.
