= Jonas Ridderstråle =

Swedish business speaker

Jonas Ridderstråle (born August 26, 1966) is a Swedish business speaker, thinker and author, best known for the bestselling book Funky Business - Talent Makes Capital Dance. He is currently a visiting professor at Ashridge Business School and IE Business School.

== Background ==
Ridderstråle was born in 1966 as the oldest of three brothers. He grew up in Staffanstorp in southern Sweden. He later moved to Stockholm, where he currently lives with his wife and two children.

== Education and academic career ==
Ridderstråle did his graduate and post graduate studies at the Stockholm School of Economics. He holds an MBA and a PhD in international business. His doctoral dissertation, Global Innovation, from 1996 focuses on product development efforts in multinational corporations. He did research and wrote his thesis at the Institute of International Business at the Stockholm School of Economics where he was mentored by the now late Professor Gunnar Hedlund. In 2004, he left the Centre for Advanced Studies of Leadership at the Stockholm School of Economics, and is currently a visiting professor at Ashridge Business School in the UK and IE Business School in Spain.

== Bestselling author and practitioner ==
Funky Business: Talent makes capital dance was published in 2000, and has been ranked at number 16 in a Bloomsbury Publishing survey of the best business books of all time. The sequels, Karaoke Capitalism: Management for mankind and Funky Business Forever: How to enjoy capitalism, also describe recipes for how to make it in the new world of commerce (all three books were co-authored with Kjell A. Nordström). In 2008, Wiley published Ridderstråle's latest book Re-energizing the Corporation: How leaders make change happen (co-written with Mark Wilcox). His books have been translated into more than 30 languages.

Since the mid-1990s, Ridderstråle has worked as a professional public speaker with engagements all over the world. He is also co-owner and chairman of the Swedish Management Group - Mgruppen, a management training and development company.

== Honors ==
In 2000, Jonas was recognized as Sweden's outstanding young academic of the year by JCI Sweden. In 2007, he received the Italian Nobels Colloquia award for “Leadership in Business and Economic Thinking”. The 2009 Thinkers 50, a biennial ranking of management thinkers, ranked him at number 23 globally and put him on the top-five list of European business gurus.

== Publications ==
- Ridderstrale, Jonas; Wilcox, Mark (2008). Re-energizing the Corporation: How Leaders Make Change Happen. ISBN 9780470687390.
- Ridderstråle, Jonas; Nordström, Kjell A (2007). Funky Business Forever: How to Enjoy Capitalism. ISBN 9780273714132.
- Ridderstråle, Jonas; Nordström, Kjell A (2004). Karaoke Capitalism: Daring to Be Different in a Copycat World. ISBN 9780275986896.
- Nordström, Kjell; Ridderstråle, Jonas (2000). Funky business: Talent makes capital dance. ISBN 9780273659075.
- Ridderstråle, Jonas (1996). Global Innovation: Managing international innovation projects at ABB and Electrolux. ISBN 9789197173049.
