= Erik Engström =

Swedish businessman

- Born: Erik Nils Engström; 14 June 1963 (age 63)
- Education: Stockholm School of Economics; Royal Institute of Technology; Harvard University
- Occupation: Businessman
- Years active: 1984–present
- Title: CEO, RELX
- Term: 2009–present
- Successor: Incumbent
- Spouse: Elizabeth Hobson "Libby" Pierpont

Erik Nils Engström (born 14 June 1963) is a Swedish businessman and the chief executive officer (CEO) of RELX, a multinational information and analytics company that operates in four market segments: scientific, technical and medical; risk and business information; legal; and exhibitions.

== Early life ==
Erik Engström is the son of Alice Engström and Dr Kjell Engström of Täby, Sweden, who was managing director of the Swedish Museum of Natural History, Stockholm. He has a BSc from the Stockholm School of Economics, an MSc from the Royal Institute of Technology in Stockholm, and an MBA from Harvard Business School, Harvard University, where he was a Fulbright scholar.

== Career ==
Engström started his career as a consultant with McKinsey & Company. He was president and chief executive officer of Bantam Doubleday Dell, North America, before its merger with Random House, and was then president and chief operating officer of Random House Inc.. He was a partner at General Atlantic.

Engström was appointed chief executive of Elsevier in 2004, and was appointed chief executive of RELX (formerly Reed Elsevier), under the chairmanship of Anthony Habgood, in 2009. Two weeks after becoming CEO, Engstrom said a strategic review was not necessary. RELX number one strategic priority has been "the organic development of increasingly sophisticated information-based analytics and decision tools that deliver enhanced value to our customers, supplemented by selective acquisitions of targeted data, analytics and exhibition assets. that support our organic growth strategies." Under Engström RELX has achieved strong business and share price performance, resulting in good compensation for Engström.

== Personal life ==
In 1997, Engström married Elizabeth Hobson "Libby" Pierpont, the daughter of Elizabeth Wentworth Pierpont and Carleton Langley Pierpont, a property developer, of Darien, Connecticut at St. James' Church in New York.
