= Reinhold Geijer =

Reinhold Geijer (born 1953 in Sundsvall, Sweden) is the CEO of Nordisk Renting and Head of the Nordic Region for the Royal Bank of Scotland.

Geijer is a descendant of Erik Gustaf Reinhold Geijer (born 1917) and Sigrid Margareta Sophie Cavalli (born 1921). Reinhold Geijer is married to Lena Kristina Linhard, and they have two sons.

Geijer holds an MSc in Business Administration from the Stockholm School of Economics and has worked in the banking sector at Föreningssparbanken, where he served as the chief executive officer of the banking group. He has also studied the Harvard Business School’s Executive Program. Geijer was Chairman of BU Europe Transition Group for separating ABN AMRO into the Consortium Banks: Royal Bank of Scotland, Fortis and Santander.
