= Erik Lakomaa =

Swedish scholar and political consultant (born 1977)

Erik Martin Lakomaa (born 14 April 1977 in Linköping) is a Swedish scholar and political consultant known for his role as strategist for the no-campaign in the 2003 Swedish referendum on the euro. He has also advised a number of centre-right politicians, most notably Lars Wohlin and Nils Lundgren. In 2005 he was awarded the Rising Star Award as the best young political consultant outside the United States.

Lakomaa begun his career as editorial writer for the conservative news paper Svenska Dagbladet and he also edited the libertarian magazine Nyliberalen. In 2004 he founded the first political consultancy in Sweden. In March 2009 the newspaper Dagens Nyheter revealed that he was one of the organizers of the anti-FRA mass surveillance law grassroots campaign the year before.

Lakomaa is a graduate from Stockholm University, (B A Political Science), Stockholm School of Economics, (M.Sc. Business & Economics), a Ph D from Stockholm School of Economics (Economic History), where he also is an affiliated assistant professor at the Department of Marketing and Strategy and the director of the Institute for Economic and Business History Research. His research is focused on how organizations, private and public, handle external (technological, institutional, market driven) change. He has published on school reforms, technological change and internationalization in the media industry, and municipal tax policy. Lakomaa has also written on the history of the Swedish Psychological Defense Agency and the cooperation between the Government and civilian advertising agencies during the cold war. In addition to his research on school reforms he has been adviser to a number of local governments on school policy and expert in two government studies on the School System.

He is the grandson of Finnish aircraft designer Aarne Lakomaa.
