= Zettle =

Swedish financial technology company

Zettle by PayPal
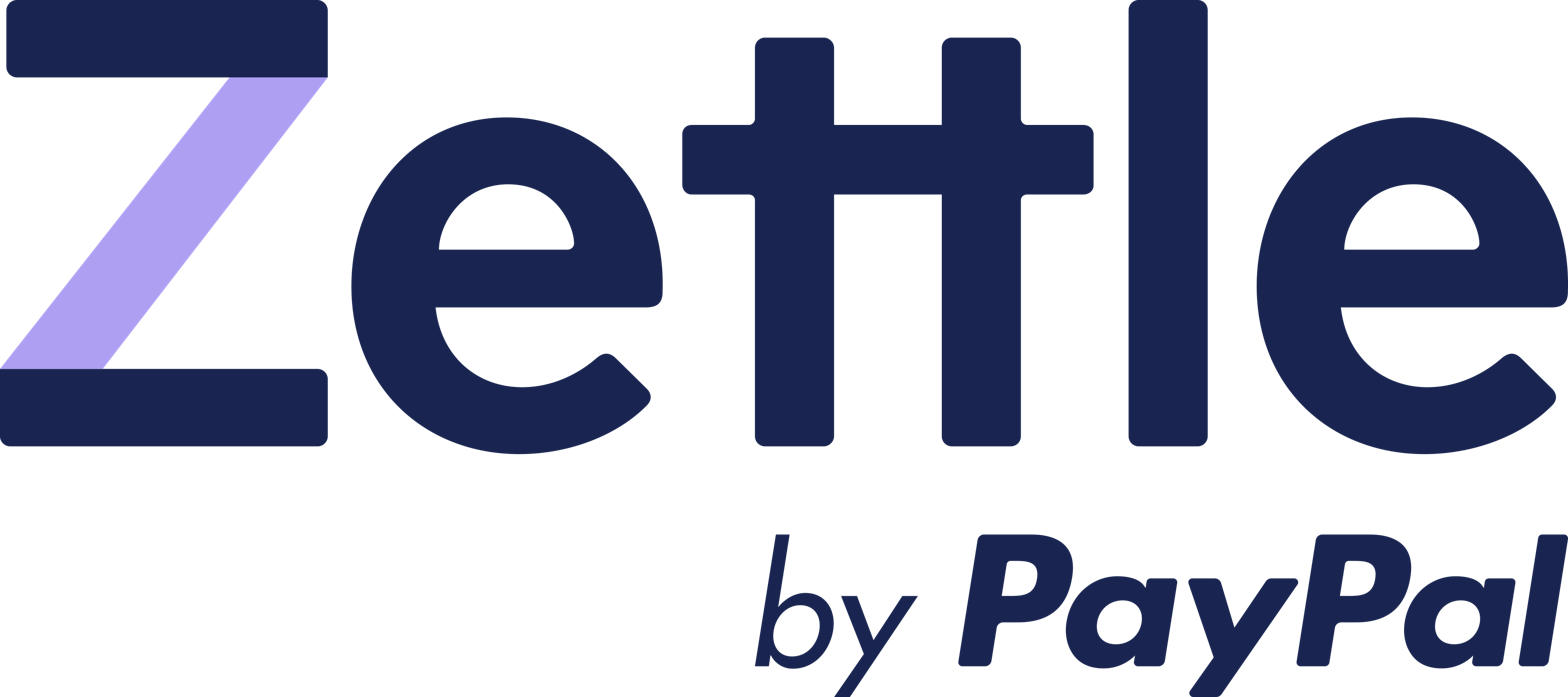
- Type: Aktiebolag
- Industry: Financial technology
- Founded: April 2010; 16 years ago in Stockholm, Sweden
- Founders: Jacob de Geer; Magnus Nilsson
- Headquarters: Stockholm, Sweden
- Number of employees: 485
- Parent: PayPal
- Website: www.zettle.com

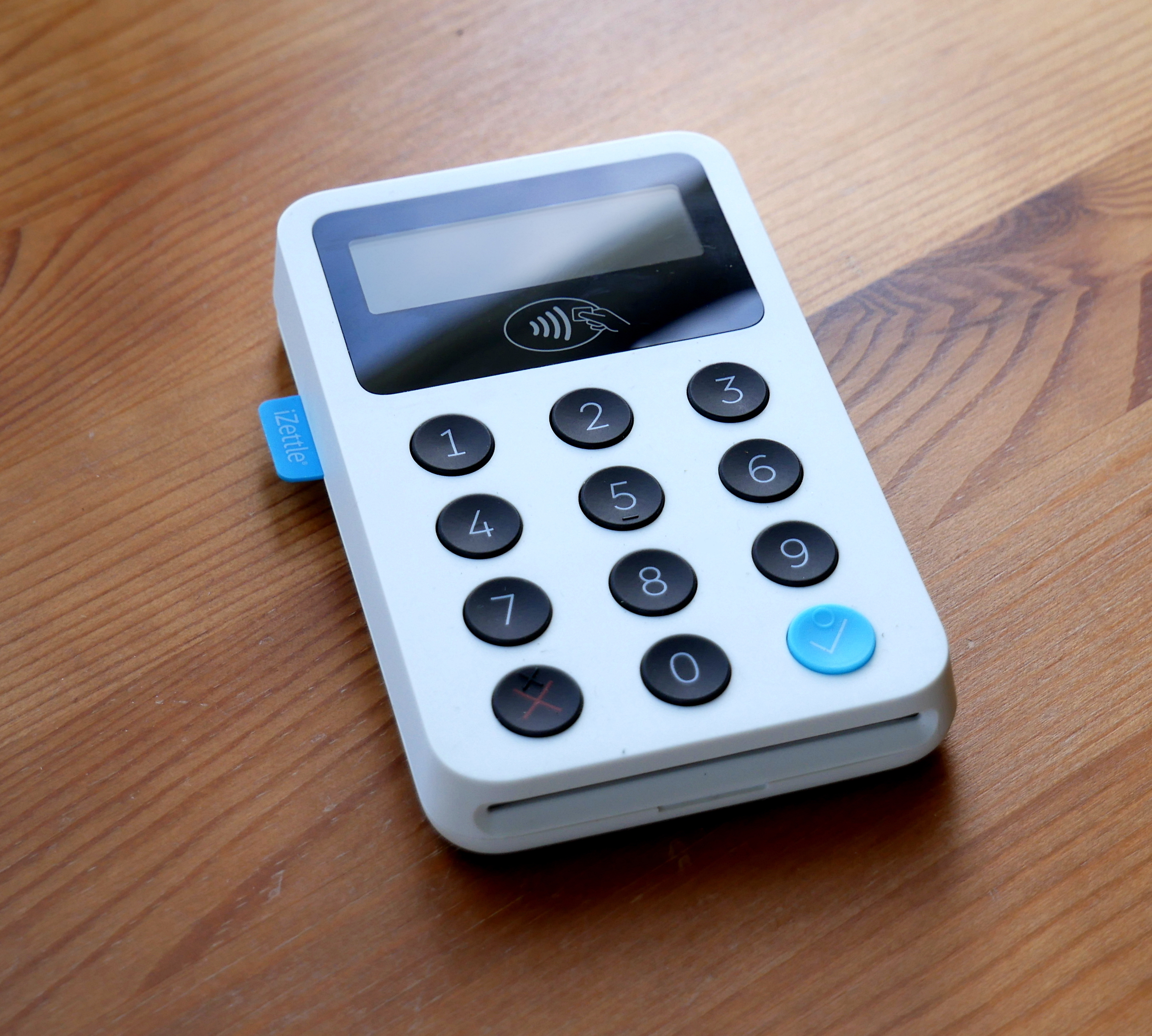
Zettle reader.

Zettle by PayPal (previously known as iZettle) is a Swedish financial technology company founded by Jacob de Geer and Magnus Nilsson in April 2010. Launching its first app and service in 2011, the company offers a range of financial products including payments, point of sales, funding and partners applications. The company was acquired by PayPal in 2018.

The company was one of the first to develop a chip-card reader and app for smartphone-based mobile commerce which meets international security requirements.

== History ==
In April 2010, Jacob de Geer and Magnus Nilsson founded iZettle and launched its first app and chip card reader in 2011. The name “iZettle” derives from the expression “settling a debt.” The founders wanted a name that described what the company would do. They decided on a stylized combination of the words “I” and “Settle.”

iZettle is de Geer's fourth start-up. de Geer was the first employee of TradeDoubler in 1999 and Ameibo and Tre Kronor Media in 2007.

In August 2011, iZettle launched its mobile app for iOS in Sweden to meet the local demands of a market dominated by smart card technology. The app worked, initially with a Chip & Signature Card Reader. Eventually, The company launched the full version of the service in Sweden later that year. Soon after launching, iZettle was listed as one of Tech Europe's Pick of Stockholm Start-ups. In August 2012, the iZettle mobile app for Android was released.

In June 2013, iZettle entered a partnership with Banco Santander, who invested more than €5M in the company and helped provide access to Santander's customers in Europe and other regions.

In June 2013, Visa signed iZettle to its Visa Ready Program, giving the startup access to tools for further developing mag stripe and mobile acceptance systems. iZettle's solution achieved a MasterCard Best Practices certification in February 2013. In September 2017, iZettle raised $36 million funding from the European Investment Bank.

On May 17, 2018, it was reported that PayPal would be buying iZettle for $2.2 billion. The impending IPO was therefore cancelled. In April 2019, the U.K. regulator granted preliminary approval for the acquisition.

In February 2021, iZettle updated their name to Zettle by PayPal.

On May 10, 2021, Zettle by PayPal made card readers available to Big Issue vendors across the UK, allowing customers to purchase the magazine from the vendors via a contactless QR code payment. As the Big Issue magazine is sold by homeless people, it is reported that Zettle by PayPal is making the card readers available to vendors across the country for a reduced price and offering a per-transaction fee "significantly lower" than its standard rate.

== Products and services ==
Zettle by PayPal offers financial and other services to meet the needs of small businesses within the following four core areas.

=== Payments ===
Zettle by PayPal offers a card acceptance service which enables small businesses to take credit and debit card payments. In 2013, Zettle by PayPal upgraded its system to include a Chip and PIN device alongside its previous model, allowing it to accept all major credit cards, including MasterCard, American Express, and Visa. In February 2015, Zettle by PayPal introduced Lite Reader, a new card reader which was offered to merchants free of charge. It was used by plugging it into the audio jack of iPhone, iPad or Android devices. In June 2016, Zettle by PayPal launched a new card terminal. Just as its previous siblings, the reader connects through Bluetooth and integrates both Chip and PIN and contactless payments. The new card reader replaced all previous card readers in Europe, and Zettle by PayPal was the first mobile payments company to accept contactless payments in the UK. This card reader also accepts all major cards including MasterCard, Visa and American Express.

=== Point of sale ===
Zettle by PayPal offers a software solution, the Zettle app, to record, manage and analyze sales. The first version of the Zettle app was launched in 2011, but then only supported iOS. Since 2012 the Zettle app is also available for Android. With Zettle's app, merchants can analyze credit card transactions and relay detailed information, i.e. top-selling products and average payment volume. In September 2016, Zettle by PayPal acquired Intelligentpos to expand from mobile payments to broaden their suite of products within commerce solutions, and in particular within the hospitality sector. Intelligentpos, similar to Zettle by PayPal, offers a cloud-based software solution that helps with inventory, loyalty programs and customer flow.

=== Small business loans ===
In 2015, Zettle launched Zettle Advance, a small business financing service built upon the transaction data gathered at the point of sale. The offer is based on the user's sales history with Zettle. Its repayment is tied to its sales. The service is available in Europe.

=== Partner applications ===
Zettle by PayPal also offers access to third-party applications such as accounting software. Zettle by PayPal launched its first software development kit (SDK) in January 2014. The SDK provides developers with the ability to add payment services to Zettle's mobile apps. It can be used in any of the countries Zettle by PayPal is currently live in, allowing for users to take payments via the app from Zettle by PayPal's Chip and PIN reader, and return relevant information to the software to generate receipts.

== Markets ==
Zettle by PayPal serves small businesses in 13 countries including Scandinavia, US, parts of Europe, the United Kingdom, Mexico and Brazil.

The Zettle by PayPal service was first launched in Sweden in 2011, followed by Denmark, Finland and Norway. In 2012, the company expanded into the United Kingdom, Germany, and Spain. The company launched its service in Mexico in June 2013 and in Brazil in August 2013, marking the first time the company has operated outside of Europe. Zettle by PayPal later launched its service in the Netherlands, France and Italy.

Zettle by PayPal is based in their headquarters in Stockholm, Sweden, but also have offices in Germany, United Kingdom, Brazil and Mexico.

In May 2018, iZettle announced that it intended to file for an IPO for $1.1 billion on the Stockholm stock exchange sometime in 2018 but this was pre-empted by a $2.2 billion acquisition offer by PayPal.
