= Börsen-Zeitung =

German daily newspaper

- Type: Daily newspaper
- Format: Broadsheet
- Owner(s): Herausgebergemeinschaft Wertpapier-Mitteilungen, Keppler, Lehmann GmbH & Co. KG
- Editor-in-chief: Sebastian Schmid
- Editor: Heidi Rohde, Daniel Schnettler
- Founded: 1 February 1952
- Language: German
- Headquarters: Frankfurt am Main
- Country: Germany
- ISSN: 0343-7728
- Website: www.boersen-zeitung.de

The Börsen-Zeitung is the main daily newspaper in Germany exclusively focused on the financial markets. The Börsen-Zeitung's headquarters is in Frankfurt, with editorial offices in Berlin, Düsseldorf, Hamburg, Munich and Stuttgart, as well as Brussels, London, New York, Madrid, Milan, Paris, Shanghai, Tokyo, Washington, DC, and Zurich.

== History ==
The Börsen-Zeitung was founded in the postwar period to help "revive and promote stock exchange trading", according to the editorial in the first issue of 1 February 1952. The existing Herausgebergemeinschaft Wertpapier-Mitteilungen, Keppler, Lehmann had been published since 1947 and focused on securities administration and bank settlements. Its publishers, a syndicate composed of the "Interessengemeinschaft Frankfurter Kreditinstitute" and the Lehmann and Keppler publishing families, decided to complement Wertpapier-Mitteilungen with a daily newspaper reporting on the securities business.

The focus of the Börsen-Zeitung in the 1950s was the capital markets. The first issues consisted mainly of reports from the German regional stock exchanges. In the early years the editorial part of the Börsen-Zeitung was limited to one or two pages and the remaining pages were lists of securities prices. Since then, the reporting content has steadily increased. The Börsen-Zeitung's perspective has become increasingly international, and the increased interest in the financial markets is reflected in the current issue length of 28 to 32 pages.

== Editorial focus ==
The focus of reporting is on news, analysis, and commentary ranging from listed companies in the banking and insurance industry, international financing institutions, German and global capital markets to monetary policy and economic and financial policy. From the outset, the paper's target readership was experts and decision makers. Thus the Börsen-Zeitungis a pure subscription newspaper and is available only at a limited number of newsagents. The Börsen-Zeitung's articles are made available to subscribers online on the eve of each publication day.

The paper is an official publication organ of all German stock exchanges.

Before stock market prices were disseminated via the Internet, the Börsen-Zeitung was the most comprehensive source for price information on the German stock exchanges. Closing prices and price movements are provided to subscribers via paper's "BZ WPI" online securities information system. Articles published in the Börsen-Zeitung since 1995 are searchable in the online archive GBI-Genios.

The Börsen-Zeitung also publishes monthly Rendite – Das Anlagemagazin der Börsen-Zeitung (Yield – The investment magazine of the Börsen-Zeitung).

In addition, the Börsen-Zeitung publishes two newsletters every two weeks: "Rules & Regulations, der Regulierungs-Newsletter der Börsen-Zeitung" (Rules & Regulations, the Regulatory Newsletter of the Börsen-Zeitung) "Fonds & Finanzen, der Assetmanagement-Newsletter der Börsen-Zeitung" (Funds & Finance, the Asset Management Newsletter of the Börsen-Zeitung).

WM Datenservice, the leading German information service for scheduling and master data for securities administration and settlement is also affiliated with Börsen-Zeitung. WM Datenservice also issues WKN and ISIN Securities Identification Numbers in Germany.

== Literature ==
- Döring, Claus; Padberg, Ernst (2002). Lesen mit Gewinn : 50 Jahre Börsen-Zeitung [Read with Profit: 50 years of Börsen-Zeitung] (in German). Frankfurt am Main: Verlag Börsen-Zeitung. ISBN 3-921696-73-9. OCLC 54007710.
