= Åke Ortmark =

Swedish journalist, writer, and television program host (1929–2018)

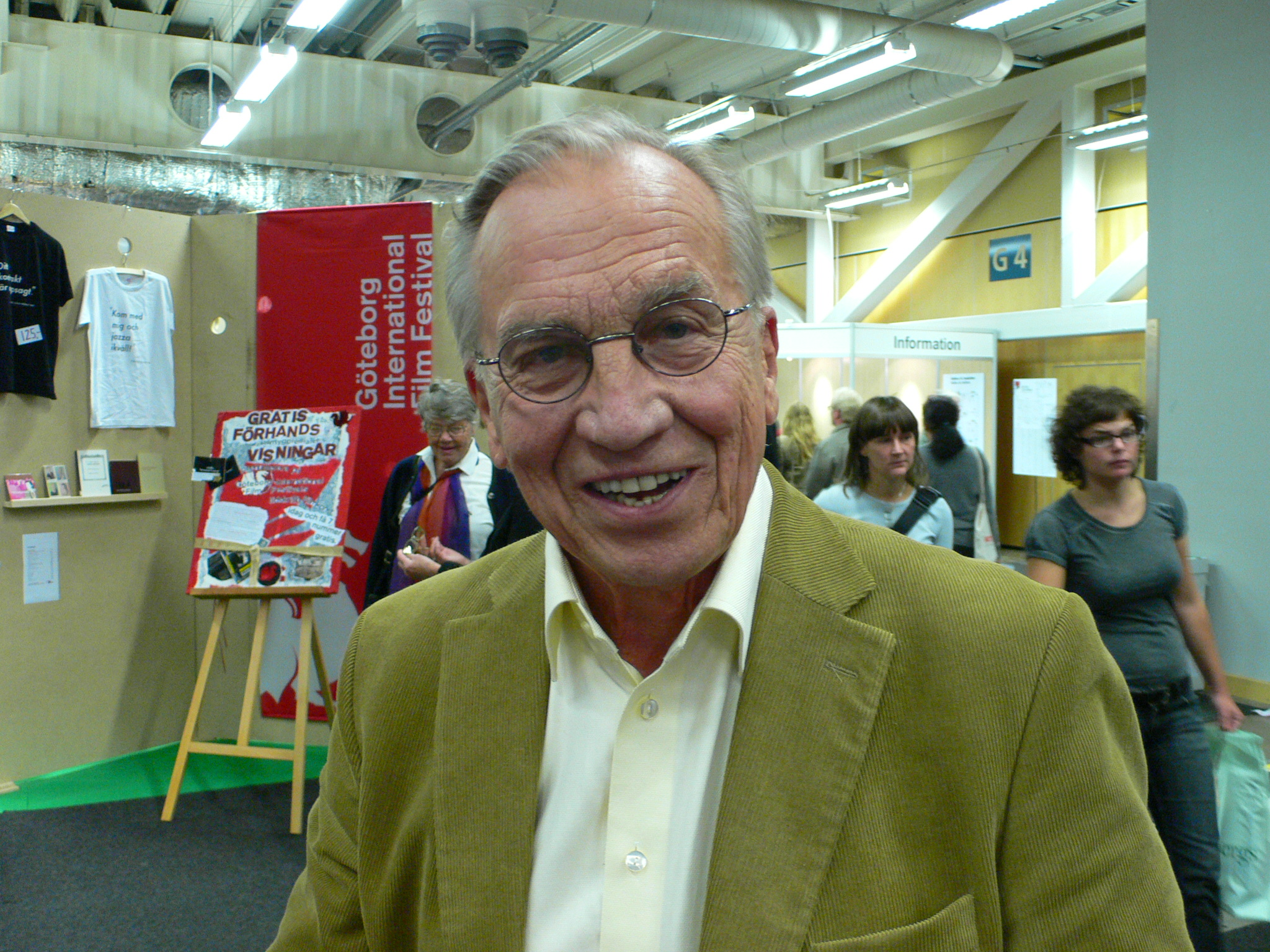
- Ortmark at the Gothenburg Book Fair in 2007
- Born: Åke Helge Ortmark; 14 May 1929; Stockholm, Sweden
- Died: 18 October 2018 (aged 89); Gothenburg, Sweden

Åke Helge Ortmark (14 May 1929 – 18 October 2018) was a Swedish journalist, author and radio and television presenter. During a long career he worked for both television and radio; he also authored several books.

== Early life ==
Ortmark was born in Stockholm, and grew up in Ålsten.

During the early 1950s he studied economics at the University of California in the United States. Ortmark earned a Master of Science in Business and Economics at Handelshögskolan in Stockholm in 1954.

== Career ==
Ortmark started working at Sveriges Radio in 1958. He was for some time a newsreader for Aktuellt which was broadcast on Sveriges Television. Together with Herbert Söderström, Ortmark pioneered the technique named "Skjutjärnsjournalistik" (hard-hitting journalism) in Swedish, on Sveriges Radio in 1962. As part of "De tre O:na", he became known for using the technique alongside Lars Orup and Gustaf Olivecrona in live broadcast on Sveriges Television in 1966 while interviewing Prime Minister Tage Erlander.

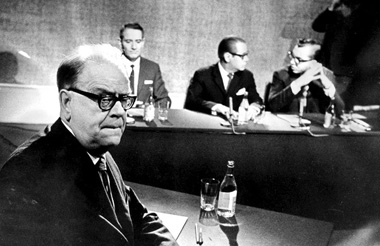
Ortmark and Erlander in the studio in 1966

Ortmark became the editor-in-chief of the weekly newspaper Veckans Affärer between 1974 and 1976. In 1997, he was the television presenter for his own interview show O som i Ortmark which was broadcast on TV8 until 2006, by which time Ortmark decided to leave to work for Axess TV.

Ortmark received the television award Kristallen in 2005 in the category Stiftelsens hederspris (the Foundation's Honour Award) for his work in TV and dedication for news and discussions.

On 25 June 2006, Ortmark took part in Sommar i P1 talking about his career and life. In 2008, he was member of Humanisternas (the humanists) council.

In 2013, Ortmark published his memoirs called Makten och lögnen – ett liv i televisionens Sverige which told about his career in journalism.

== Personal life ==
Åke Ortmark in 1961 married Sinikka Tenhunen. After his divorce, he married Annika Roth in 1974. Ortmark was the father of three children.

Ortmark had a black belt in karate.

Ortmark died on 18 October 2018 after a short time of illness at the age of 89.

== Bibliography ==
- 1963 – Sveket mot konsumenterna
- 1967 – Maktspelet i Sverige
- 1969 – De okända makthavarna
- 1971 – Maktens redskap, ISBN 91-46-11637-0
- 1972 – Den inre cirkeln, ISBN 91-46-11726-1
- 1977 – Lamco!, ISBN 91-46-13028-4
- 1981 – Skuld och makt, ISBN 91-46-13891-9
- 1985 – Maktens människor, ISBN 91-46-15028-5
- 1996 – Ja-sägarna, ISBN 91-7964-189-X
- 2013 – Makten och lögnen: ett liv i televisionens Sverige, ISBN 978-91-0-012462-5

== Filmography ==
- 1973 – Makt på spel (TV series)
