= Stockholm School of Economics Russia =

- Стокгольмская Школа Экономики
- Type: Private
- Established: 1997
- Rector: Anders Paalzow
- Location: Saint Petersburg / Moscow, Russia
- Website: SSE Russia

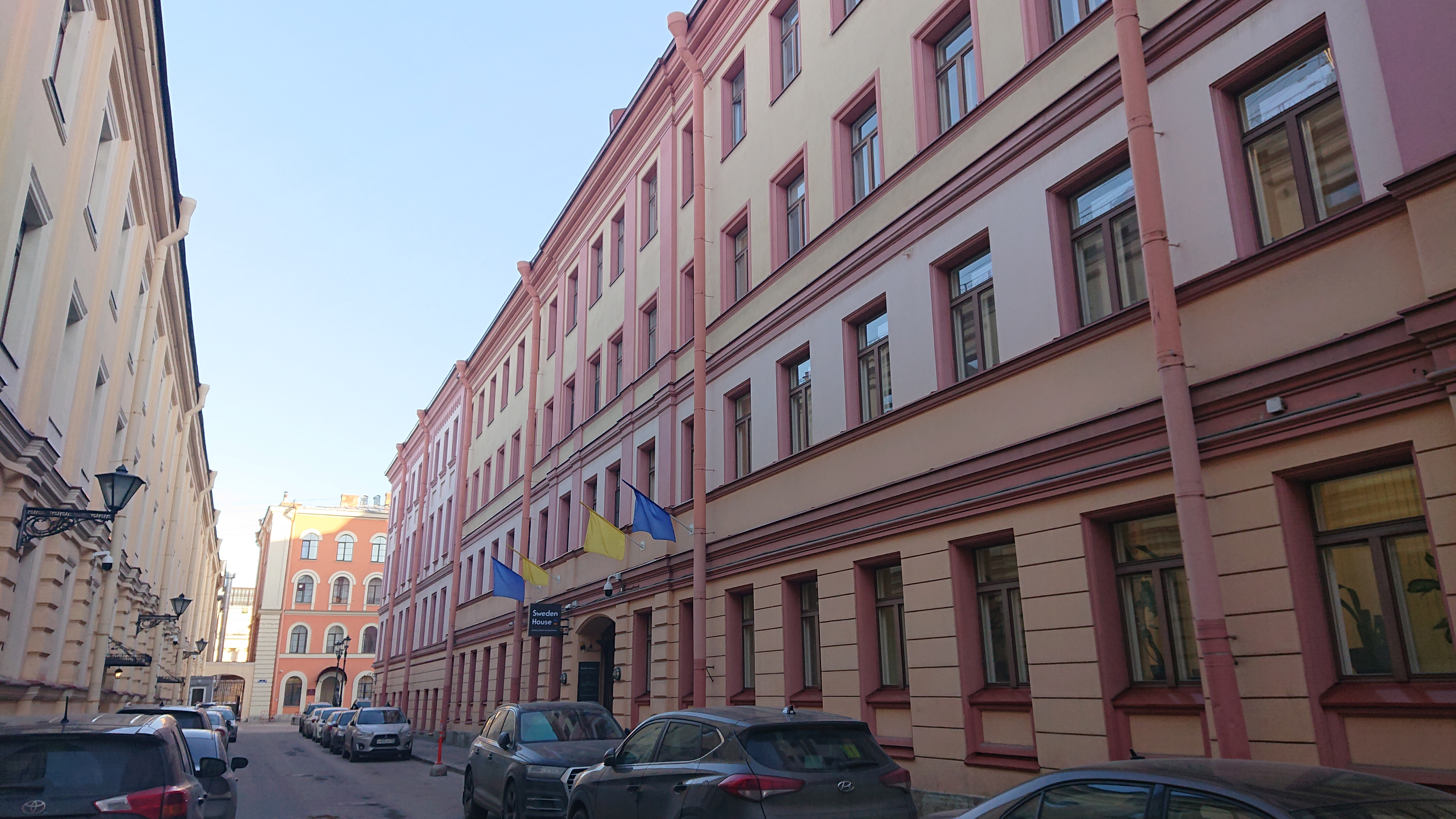
SSE Russia's main building in Saint Petersburg.

The Stockholm School of Economics Russia, SSE Russia (Russian Стокгольмская школа экономики России, Swedish: Handelshögskolan i Stockholm Ryssland) is a business school with representation offices in Moscow and St Petersburg. It was founded in 1997 as a subsidiary of the Stockholm School of Economics, with the purpose of supplying the economies of North-eastern Europe in general and Russia in particular with well-educated young professionals. English is the basic language of instruction. Since 2009 SSE Russia offers an EMBA-program in General Management with simultaneous translation into Russian language.

== See also ==
- List of universities in Russia
- Stockholm School of Economics
- Stockholm School of Economics in Riga
