= Stockholm School of Economics =

University in Stockholm, Sweden

- Handelshögskolan i Stockholm
- Motto: Att genom vetenskaplig undervisning och forskning befrämja affärsverksamhetens höjande inom landet
- Motto in English: Strengthen Sweden's Competitiveness Through Research and Science-Based Education
- Type: Private
- Established: 1909; 117 years ago
- Affiliations: CEMS; EUA; ICEDR; EFMD; APSIA
- President: Lars Strannegård
- Administrative staff: 300
- Students: 2,000 full-time equivalent students (as of 2026)
- Doctoral students: 150
- Location: Stockholm, Sweden; 59°20′30″N 18°03′26″E
- Campus: Urban
- Language: English; Swedish
- Nickname: Handels; SSE
- Colours: Green
- Mascot: Hermes
- Website: hhs.se

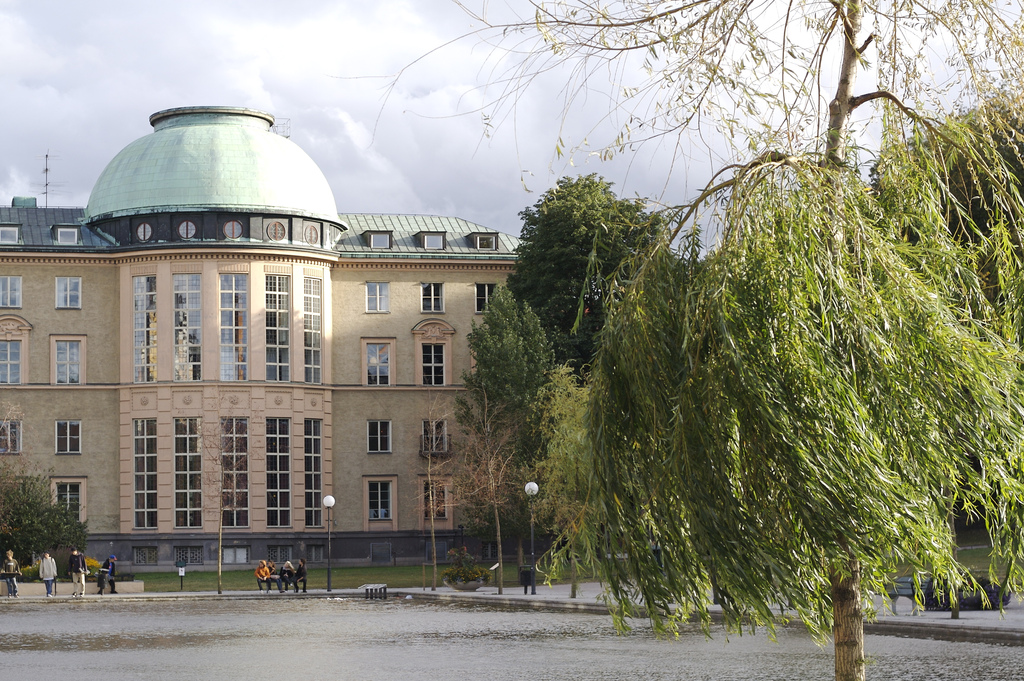
The main building of the school, designed by Ivar Tengbom and built 1925–1926, is located at Sveavägen in central Stockholm.

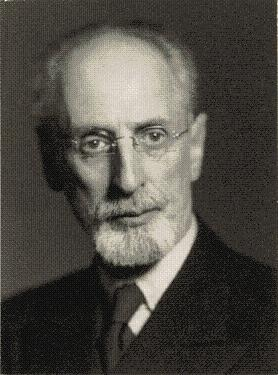
Professor Eli Heckscher, founder of economic history as an independent academic discipline

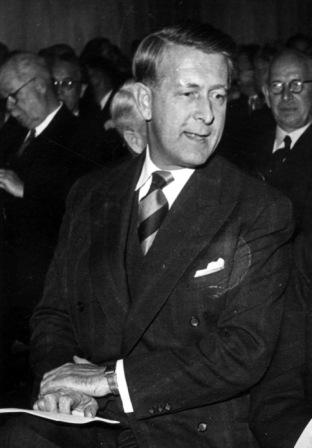
Professor Bertil Ohlin developed the Heckscher–Ohlin model, the standard international mathematical model of international trade; received the Nobel Memorial Prize in Economic Sciences in 1977.

The Stockholm School of Economics (SSE; Swedish: Handelshögskolan i Stockholm, HHS) is a private business school located in Vasastan's city district in the central part of Stockholm, Sweden. SSE offers BSc, MSc and MBA programs, along with PhD- and Executive education programs.

SSE is accredited by EQUIS and is a member of CEMS. SSE has founded sister organizations: SSE Riga in Riga, Latvia, and SSE Russia in St Petersburg and Moscow, Russia. It also operates the European Institute of Japanese Studies (Japanese, kanji: 欧州日本研究所, Japanese, romaji: Ōshū Nihon kenkyūjo), a research institute in Tokyo, Japan.

== History ==
The banker Knut Agathon Wallenberg donated 100 000 SEK in 1903 (Equivalent to around 7,2 million SEK in 2026) to lobby for founding a business school in Stockholm. Wallenberg considered that "It was important to raise the social status of the merchant class". Lobbying was necessary because the classical tradition in western thought has a long-standing disdain for commerce, dating back to the ancient Greeks. This disdain was also evident during the Middle Ages, when trade was considered equivalent to theft and seen as a dirty and vulgar occupation. During this time, merchants were known in swedish as: Krämare, from the greek chrema (money), were socially scorned, even by the upper class, and were perceived as unproductive individuals solely interested in "making money.".

Continuing the lobbying the Wallenberg family also financed a study trip where the doctor in philosophy Helmer Keys set out to travel through Europe to collect data that could motivate the decision to establish a business school. This resulted in the report called "on the centrality of trade-schools (Swedish: Om betydelsen av handelshögskolor"), where Key presented the founding of a business school as both positive and necessary. The report was subsequently used to propagate for the centrality of founding a business school in Stockholm.

Later on, a circular letter was written where people from the Stockholm Bourgeoisie was offered to pay 400 SEK per year to become initiating members of the school of business association (Handelshögskoleföreningen). In an appendix to a deed of foundation published by the school of business Association, the founding members up to 28 February 1907 are listed. The founders consisted of 109 merchants, 47 bank directors or similar, 26 mill owners or similar, 9 engineers, 16 other city councillors, barons or similar, and three companies. Most of the members were men, but one person was female. Two families were overrepresented, namely the Söderberg and Wallenberg families. The founders were predominantly based in Stockholm, Djursholm, or Saltsjöbaden. However, the academic background among the school's founders was almost entirely nonexistent.

The name handelshögskola (roughly "college of commerce") was a parallel to the German term Handelshochschule, used by a number of German institutions started in the years before, commencing with Handelshochschule Leipzig in 1898. The term högskola was at this time also established for specialised higher educational institutions outside the universities, such as the Royal Institute of Technology, (Kungl.) Tekniska högskolan, which bore that name from 1877. The Stockholm School of Economics was formally founded in 1909 on private initiative as a response to rapid industrialization and a growing need for educated businessmen and company managers and has maintained close ties with the business community ever since. It was the first business school established in Sweden.

While founded as a business school, the subject of economics featured prominently in the research and curriculum of the school from the beginning.

The most well known scholars of the Stockholm School of Economics are arguably the economists Eli Heckscher (professor of economics and statistics 1909–1929, professor of economic history 1929–1945), and Bertil Ohlin (professors of economics). Heckscher is also known as the founder of economic history as an independent academic discipline and his work Svenskt Arbete och Liv is a fundamental work within this subject.

Ohlin was also a leading figure within the school of doctrine with the same name, the so-called Stockholm school; a group of leading Scandinavian economists influenced by Knut Wicksell, most of them active in Stockholm, either at the Stockholm School of Economics or the Stockholm University College. This school of doctrine was to have a profound influence on post-WWII Swedish economic policy and the development of the modern Scandinavian welfare state. Heckscher and Ohlin jointly developed the so-called Heckscher–Ohlin theory, the standard international mathematical model of international trade. Bertil Ohlin received the Nobel Prize in Economics in 1977 (shared with British economist James Meade). Other prominent members of the Stockholm school were the Stockholm University professor Gustav Cassel, who developed standard economic theory of Purchasing power parity and economist Dag Hammarskjöld, Secretary-General of the United Nations in New York City, United States.

The school is a full member of the Association of Professional Schools of International Affairs (APSIA), a group of schools of public policy, public administration, and international studies.

== Academics ==
=== Admission ===
For Master programmes, applicants have to have a GMAT score of over 600 and a TOEFL iBT score of over 100 in order to be considered suitable for applying. In the academic year 2012/2013 the university received 3261 applications for the four Masters programmes which it offered at the time. Therefore, the according acceptance rate would have been low.

=== Grading ===
SSE uses a 5-grading scale which includes the following, Excellent (5.0), Very Good (4.0), Good (3.5), Pass (3.0) and Fail (0.0). A Grade Point Average (GPA) is giving between 3.0 and 5.0. There is also a possibility to obtain an award, Outstanding Achievement, which implies that the student gets at least Excellent as final grade, and that it's the first time the student are taking the course. The person responsible for the course have the opportunity to award up to 10% of the students with Outstanding Achievement. The award does not impact the calculation of the student's Grade Point Average (GPA). Furthermore, the 10 percent of students with the highest GPA in the BSc programmes who complete the studies on time, that is, no later than three years after they were enrolled, receive the President's list award. Completion of studies on time entails having completed all courses in connection with the examination retake period in August at the latest.

=== Programmes ===
Stockholm School of Economics offers the following programmes:

- Bachelor of Science (BSc) in Business and Economics
- Bachelor of Science (BSc) in Retail Management
- Master of Science (MSc) in Finance
- Master of Science (MSc) in Business & Management
- Master of Science (MSc) in Accounting, Valuation & Financial Management
- Master of Science (MSc) in Economics
- Master of Science (MSc) in International Business
- Master of Science (MSc) in Public Policy (offered from Autumn 2027)
- Doctoral (PhD) Programme with three specializations (Business Administration, Economics, Finance)
- MBA Program (offered in executive format)

The educational programmes are mostly conducted in English. However, there are some elective courses given in Swedish at bachelor's- and master's programmes as well as the SSE Executive Education.

=== Bachelor's programmes ===
==== SSE Bachelor of Science in Business and Economics ====
The Bachelor of Science in Business and Economics is a three-year program (180 ECTS credits). The BSc in Business and Economics is a program designed for students with an interest in a broad business education, including subjects as economics, finance, accounting, marketing, management, entrepreneurship, data analytics, business law and strategy. The program makes you eligible to study a MSc at the Stockholm School of Economics or another university in Sweden or abroad. Yearly, roughly 300 students are enrolled in the BE programme.

==== SSE Bachelor of Science in Retail Management ====
The Bachelor of Science in Retail Management is a three-year program (180 ECTS credits). The BSc in Retail Management is a specialised program focused mainly on retailing. During the third year of the program students are taking an Applied retail track where theory and practice are combined. BSc in Retail Management makes you eligible to most of the MSc programmes at SSE and also other MSc programmes in Sweden or abroad. Compared to SSE's Business and Economics programme the Retail Management programme offers fewer student places, 60 opposed to 300.

=== Master's programmes ===
==== SSE Master of Science in Business and Management ====
The Master of Science in Business and Management is a two-year program (120 ECTS credits). There are offered three specializations: International Business (CEMS), Management and Marketing & Media Management. Within their specialization, students write a Master's thesis worth 30 ECTS credits.

==== SSE Master of Science in Economics ====
The MSc in Economics is a program designed for students with a background in economics or business. As well as the other master programs it is a two-year program with 120 ECTS. There are offered two specializations: Applied Economic Analysis and International Economics.

==== SSE Master of Science in Finance ====
The MSc in Finance is a program designed for students with a background in finance or business. As well as the other master programs it is a two-year program with 120 ECTS. There are offered two specializations: Corporate Finance and Investment management.

==== SSE Master of Science in International Business ====
The MSc in International Business is a two-year program targeting students who see the world as their home and is fully integrated with CEMS MIM. The current CEMS Club Board is represented by Martina Mariani, Sebastian Schaaf and Julia Gerwien. The MSc Program in International Business takes part in the FT Masters in Management ranking. The latest ranking placed the program 7th out of 100 participating top international business schools.

==== SSE Master of Science in Accounting, Valuation, and Financial Management ====
The MSc in Accounting, Valuation, and Financial Management is also a two-year program (120 ECTS). After a core of four courses in the first semester, students are allowed to choose between a limited number of courses in the second semester. In the third semester, students may apply for an exchange program, an executive trainee program, or free choice of electives. In the fourth and final semester, students work in pairs on a thesis. Students may also apply for a double degree with a CEMS Msc in International Management degree.

=== MBA programme ===
==== SSE Masters of Business Administration (MBA), Executive Format ====
The SSE EMBA program was launched in 2001. Since 2001, the year the Financial Times began its Executive MBA ranking, the SSE Executive MBA has been the first in the Nordic league. Worldwide its average rank in the last three years was 56.

=== PhD programmes ===
==== SSE PhD in Business Administration, Economics, Finance ====
The SSE PhD Program was launched more than 60 years ago and has graduated more than 500 PhDs. There are three separate PhD programs at SSE:

- Business Administration
- Economics
- Finance

== Student life ==
The Student Association at the Stockholm School of Economics (SASSE, Swedish: Handelshögskolans i Stockholm studentkår; abbreviated HHSS) is the chief organ of student government at SSE. The student association is organized into eight committees with different responsibilities. The committees are the following:

- The Business Committee (Näringslivsutskottet) (NU)
- The Education Committee (Utbildningsutskottet) (UU)
- The Entertainment Committee (Programutskottet) (PU)
- The International Committee (Internationella utskottet) (IntU)
- The Tech Committee (Techutskottet) (TechU)
- The Media Committee (Mediautskottet) (MedU)
- The Social Committee (Sociala utskottet) (SU)
- The Sports Committee (Idrottsutskottet) (IdU)

Each committee is headed by a president, who is also a member of the board of the student association. Moreover, there is a president of the whole SASSE who are elected each year by the students at the school.

== Alumni ==
Stockholm School of Economics (SSE) alumni are defined as previous students that have graduated from one of SSE's degree programs. Today, there are some 14 000 alumni in this network. In addition to the alumni are the so-called SSE IFL Networkers, previous participants at IFL open or custom programs, these sum up to an additional 10 000.

SSE maintains contacts with its alumni in a number of different ways; both through direct and indirect contacts and through various types of communication channels. Contacts are administered through the SSE Alumni Office.

Today, many alumni are involved in the school's advisory board, the alumni association's board, the Student Association et al., all aligned to SSE activities. Even more alumni return to the School as guest lectures, or sponsors of course projects, as suppliers of internship opportunities, or as recruiters from large companies.

Currently, if an alumnus wishes to connect with another SSE graduate, they have five primary options: 1. Attending the alumni events arranged by SSE Alumni Office 2. Networking through the SSE Alumninet, a web portal open to holders of an SSE diploma. Alumninet had some 14 000 members as of January 2013, or through the official LinkedIn groups maintained by SSE 3. Membership in the Alumni Association of the Stockholm School of Economics – an alumni association sponsored and organized by alumni for Swedish-speaking graduates of SSE – or by joining the American Friends of SSE – an affiliated alumni group, based in the US. 4. Joining any of the unofficial alumni groups and networks, maintained by the alumni themselves, e.g. in the UK.

=== Noted alumni ===
- Sebastian Siemiatkowski, co-founder and CEO of Klarna
- Jacob de Geer, co-founder and CEO of iZettle
- Dan T. Sehlberg, Author of novels MONA and SINON, founder and CEO of Sehlhall Fastigheter, CEO of Citat Group
- Inga-Britt Ahlenius
- Yegor Altman, entrepreneur, media executive, founder and CEO of Altmans Gallery
- Jonas Andersson (swimmer)
- Magdalena Andersson, former prime minister of Sweden
- Alexander Bard
- Frank Belfrage
- Erik Berglöf
- Thomas Berglund, former president and CEO of Securitas
- Inga Björk-Klevby
- Anna Breman, Governor of the Reserve Bank of New Zealand from 1 December 2025
- Lars Calmfors
- Jan Carlzon, former CEO of SAS Group
- Claes Dahlbäck, former president and CEO of Investor AB, chairman of the board of Stora Enso, member of the board of Goldman Sachs
- Micael Dahlén
- Hans Dalborg, former CEO of Skandia, president and CEO of Nordbanken AB 1991–2004
- Ulf Dinkelspiel, former deputy minister of foreign affairs of Sweden
- Marie Ehrling, former deputy CEO of SAS and CEO of TeliaSonera Sweden
- Kristian Ek
- Henrik Ekelund
- Fredrik Eklund
- Klas Eklund
- Erik Engstrom, CEO of Reed Elsevier
- Gunvor Engström
- Ali Esbati
- Johan Forssell
- Christer Gardell
- Reinhold Geijer
- Philip Haglund
- Lars Heikensten, former governor of Sveriges Riksbank, the national bank of Sweden
- Stefan Ingves, incumbent governor of Sveriges Riksbank
- Jerker Johansson
- Olof Johansson, former acting minister for communications and former minister of the environment of Sweden
- Bill Keenan, author, and former professional hockey player
- Anna Kinberg Batra, member of the Riksdag, the parliament of Sweden
- Erik Lakomaa
- Staffan Burenstam Linder, former professor, inventor of the Linder hypothesis, former minister of trade of Sweden
- Lars Ljungqvist
- Per Olof Loof, CEO of KEMET Corporation
- Fredrik Lundberg, president and CEO of L E Lundbergföretagen AB
- Kristian Luuk
- Bertil Näslund
- Tobias Nielsén
- Lars Nittve, former director of Rooseum in Malmö, Tate Modern in London, Moderna Museet in Stockholm and present director of M+, a new museum of visual culture under construction in the West Kowloon Cultural District of Hong Kong, to open in 2018
- Kjell A. Nordström
- Ann-Christin Nykvist
- Mikael Odenberg, former minister of defence of Sweden
- Bertil Ohlin, professor of economics, developed the Heckscher–Ohlin model together with professor Eli Heckscher, founded the Stockholm school together with professor Gunnar Myrdal, leader of Folkpartiet (Liberal People's Party of Sweden) 1944–1967, Nobel laureate in economics in 1977
- Claudia Olsson, founder of Stellar Capacity
- Sydney Onayemi
- Karin Pilsäter
- Mats Qviberg
- Ruben Rausing, founder of the liquid-food packaging company Tetra Pak
- Bo Johan Renck
- Eric Rhenman
- Jonas Ridderstråle
- Karl Gustaf Scherman
- Mikael Schiller
- Suleyman Sleyman
- Agneta Stark
- Viveca Sten
- Charlotte Strömberg
- Oscar Swartz, founded Bahnhof, the first independent Internet service provider in Sweden
- Max Tegmark, professor at the Massachusetts Institute of Technology
- Margaretha af Ugglas, former minister for foreign affairs of Sweden, daughter of Hugo Stenbeck, the founder of Investment AB Kinnevik
- Louise Wachtmeister
- Joakim Weidemanis, CEO of Johnson Controls.
- Per Westerberg, chairman of the Riksdag, the Swedish parliament
- Anne Wibble, finance minister of Sweden 1991–1994, daughter of Bertil Ohlin
- Peter Wolodarski, editor-in-chief of Dagens Nyheter, the largest daily newspaper in Sweden, by circulation
- Eva Walder, economist and diplomat
- Mette Morsing, professor

== Partner Universities ==
SSE has about 70 partner universities and each academic year, SSE sends over 180 students abroad on exchange and hosts over 180 exchange students from all over the world. The majority of the exchange places are part of the Master's program, but some places are offered at the Bachelor's level. The student exchange places are reserved for students from the SSE partner universities.

== See also ==
- Student Association at the Stockholm School of Economics
- Stockholm School of Economics in Riga
- Stockholm School of Economics Russia
- List of business schools in the Nordic countries
