= Aarne Lakomaa =

- Born: 1914
- Died: 2001 (aged 86–87)
- Military career
- Allegiance: Finland
- Branch: Army
- Service years: 1939–40; 1941–44
- Rank: Lieutenant
- Conflicts: Winter War; Continuation War
- Other work: Saab

Aarne Lakomaa (1914–2001) was a Finnish aircraft designer. Born in Finland, Lakomaa graduated from Helsinki Polytechnics. He fought as an Army Lieutenant in the Winter War (1939–40) and the Continuation War (1941–44) against the Soviet Union. There he became famous for fitting captured Russian engines to the obsolete French fighter Morane-Saulnier M.S.406, thereby creating a first rate fighter, the Mörkö-Morane ("mörkö" being Finnish roughly for "bogeyman" or "hobgoblin"). Aarne Lakomaa first replaced the original Hispano-Suiza 12Y 31 liquid-cooled V-12 rated at 860 hp with a 1,100 hp Soviet engine— the Klimov M-105P—which was a war booty. This engine was installed under the cover of a more aerodynamic cowling and fitted with a different pitch propeller. The French M.S.406's airframe was strengthened, and an oil cooler from a Messerschmitt-109 replaced the old one. In this way over-heating problems was finally solved. As a result of these modifications, the improved version of Morane had a 36-mph speed advantage over all previous versions.

Lakomaa was recruited to Saab in 1944 as an aircraft designer. He was involved in the development of the fighters Saab 35 Draken and Saab 37 Viggen, and later headed R&D at Saab where he designed a number of prototypes, including a rocket propelled interceptor, nuclear weapon carriers, replacements for the Draken and Viggen, which was initially developed to substitute the Saab 32, and a supersonic business jet. Aarne Lakomaa was a part of team that first began studies on this theme in 1952–57. They were aimed at producing an aircraft with excellent short runway performance.

== Aircraft designs ==
=== Civilian projects ===
- Saab 90 Scandia, airliner 1946
- SuperSonic Executive (SSE), a sort of a large Viggen with twin J 93s for 4–6 passengers, 1968
- Saab 108 Turboprop airliner
- Saab 115/108-6: Three-engined jet commuter
- Saab 107 (STOL/RTOL) field transport aircraft
- Saab 108 MULAS, 1977:
- Saab 109 Twin engined business jet
- Saab 110 As 109 but three engines and up to nine passengers
- Saab 111 Single engine agricultural turboprop
- Saab 112 Twin jet corporate aircraft, 15 passengers, 1969
- Saab 113 Three-engined corporate jet, 25 passengers, 1969
- Saab 190 Super Scandia, twin ALF 502 commuter jet (over the wings for grass field capability), 1975
- Saab 340

=== Military projects ===
- Saab 1319 missile-armed fighter with two de Havilland rocket engines
- Saab 1325 was a Draken replacement fighter with Gyron jets with partial afterburners on the wingtips and an (automatically starting in case of engine failure) rocket in the tail (the rocket motor is still in use on sounding rockets)
- Saab 1350 was a larger attack variant of 1325, with full afterburners
- Saab 1352 single engine (Olympus) of 1350
- Saab 1372 was an unstable double delta (did not proceed far, in fact, not even a wind tunnel model was produced)
- Saab 1376 was the A 36 nuclear strike bomber
- Saab 1377 like 1376 but with a dorsal air intake
- Saab 1421B was a M 2.8 Draken replacement in 1956
- Saab 1500-01, which was similar to a Harrier
- Saab 1504 in 1961 looked very much like Viggen
