= Kjell A. Nordström =

Swedish economist, writer and public speaker

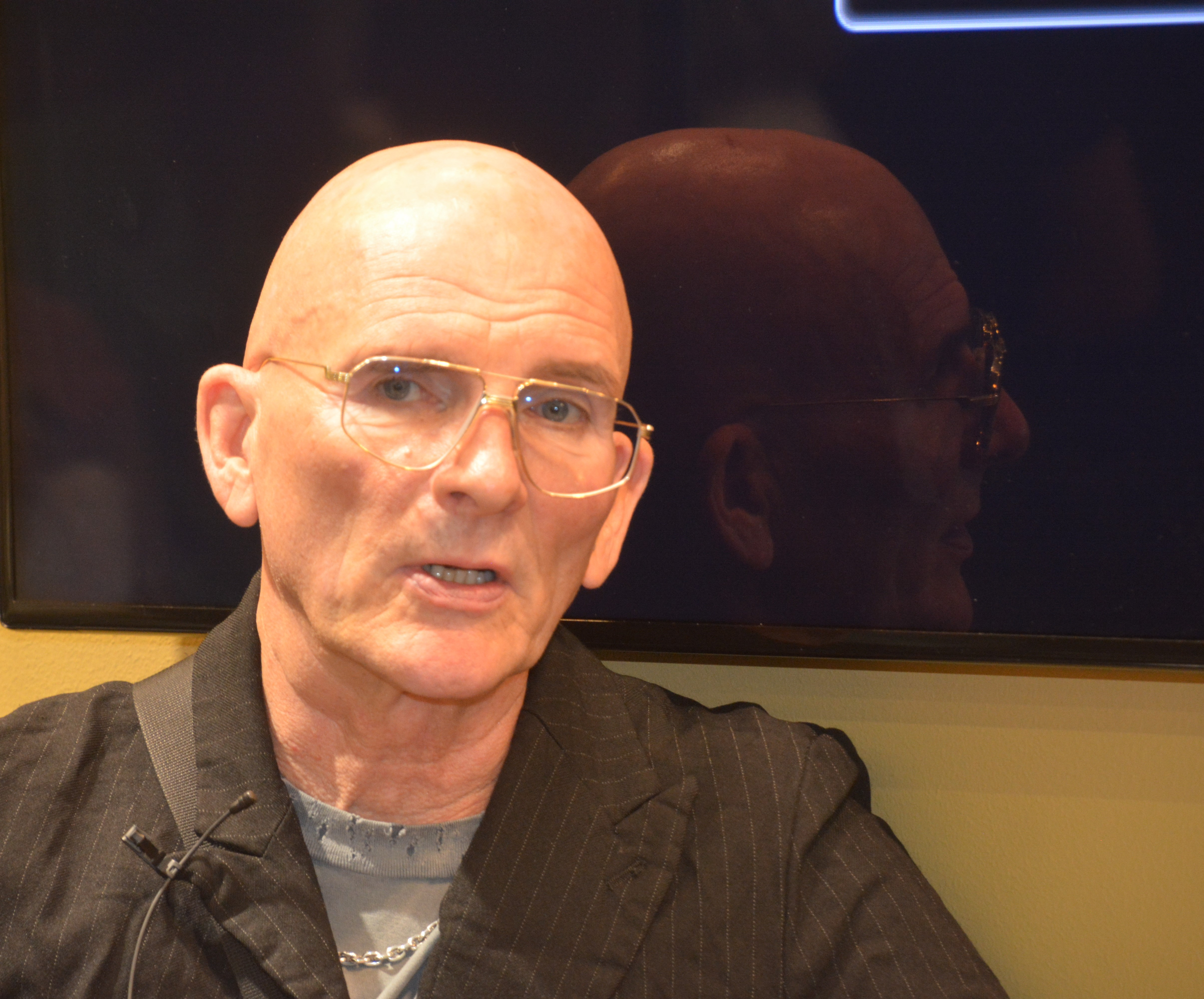
Kjell A. Nordström at Göteborg Book Fair, 2023

Kjell Anders Nordström (born 26 February 1958) is a Swedish economist, writer and public speaker.

== Biography ==
Today, Nordström and Ridderstråle work as professional public speakers in the field of strategic management. The 2005 Thinkers 50, the bi-annual global ranking of management thinkers, ranked Nordström and Ridderstråle at number nine internationally and number one in Europe.

== Work ==
In 2000 the book Funky Business - Talent Makes Capital Dance, which was written by Kjell A. Nordström and his colleague Jonas Ridderstråle, was published. The book, which is described as a "manifesto of what our time requires from business firms and their leaders", became an international best-seller and has to date been translated into 33 languages. In 2000, both Amazon.co.uk and the webzine Management General rated it as one of the five best business books of the year. Another survey ranked it as the 16th best business book of all time.

In 2003, the follow-up Karaoke Capitalism - Management for Mankind, also written together with Jonas Ridderstråle, was published. The book, which also became an international success, has to date been contracted for publication in 23 languages. In March 2004, Nordström and Ridderstråle appeared on CNN's program Global Office for an extensive interview on the ideas behind Karaoke Capitalism.

== Publications ==
- Ridderstrale, Jonas; Wilcox, Mark (2009). Re-energizing the Corporation: How Leaders Make Change Happen. John Wiley & Sons. ISBN 9780470687390.
- Ridderstråle, Jonas; Nordström, Kjell A (2007). Funky Business Forever: How to Enjoy Capitalism. Financial Times/Prentice Hall. ISBN 9780273714132.
- Ridderstråle, Jonas; Nordström, Kjell A (2005). Karaoke Capitalism: Daring to Be Different in a Copycat World. Praeger. ISBN 9780275986896.
- Nordström, Kjell A.; Ridderstråle, Jonas (2000). Funky business: Talent makes capital dance. Financial Times. ISBN 9780273659075.
- Nordström, Kjell A; Institutet För Internationellt Företagande, Handelshögskolan i Stockholm (1991). The internationalization process of the firm: Searching for new patterns and explanations. Institute of International Business, Stockholm School of Economics. ISBN 9789197100571.
- Vahlne, Jan-Erik; Nordström, Kjell A (1986). Global Oligopolies and the Advantage Cycle.
- Vahlne, Jan-Erik, and Kjell A. Nordström (1992). Is the globe shrinking: Psychic distance and the establishment of Swedish sales subsidiaries during the last 100 years.
