= Alfred Berg =

Nordic financial services enterprise

Alfred Berg is a Nordic asset manager with offices in Oslo and Stockholm with expertise in portfolio management and financial analysis. Alfred Berg is an independent part of BNP Paribas Asset Management.

Alfred Berg was founded in Sweden in 1863, the same year that the Stockholm Stock Exchange opened, by Carl Gustaf Hierzéel and was a leading Nordic investment bank. The company was named after the banker Alfred Berg, who took over the company in 1901. During the major part of the 1900s the Alfred Berg was owned by the Kahm family. However, in the mid-1980s, the company was sold to Volvo and Alfred Berg started to expand by becoming the largest shareholder in the company Gunnar Bøhn & Co in Norway. This was the first step in building a Nordic company based on local expertise.

Shortly after the Norwegian expansion, Alfred Berg also expanded its operations to Denmark, and took over Denmark's oldest brokerage firm Brødr. Trier, established in 1877. During the early 1990s Alfred Berg continued to expand and opened offices in Helsinki, London, New York and Moscow, and by that the company was present in the leading world markets. In 1995 Alfred Berg was acquired by ABN AMRO.

The expansion continued, and the company became a strong Nordic asset manager within a wide global network. In 2004, Alfred Berg's asset management business was fully integrated into ABN AMRO Asset Management. In April 2010, the merger between Fortis Investments and BNP Paribas Investment Partners was completed, and Alfred Berg became a specialist Asset Manager within the network of asset management companies.
