= Jan Carlzon =

Swedish businessman

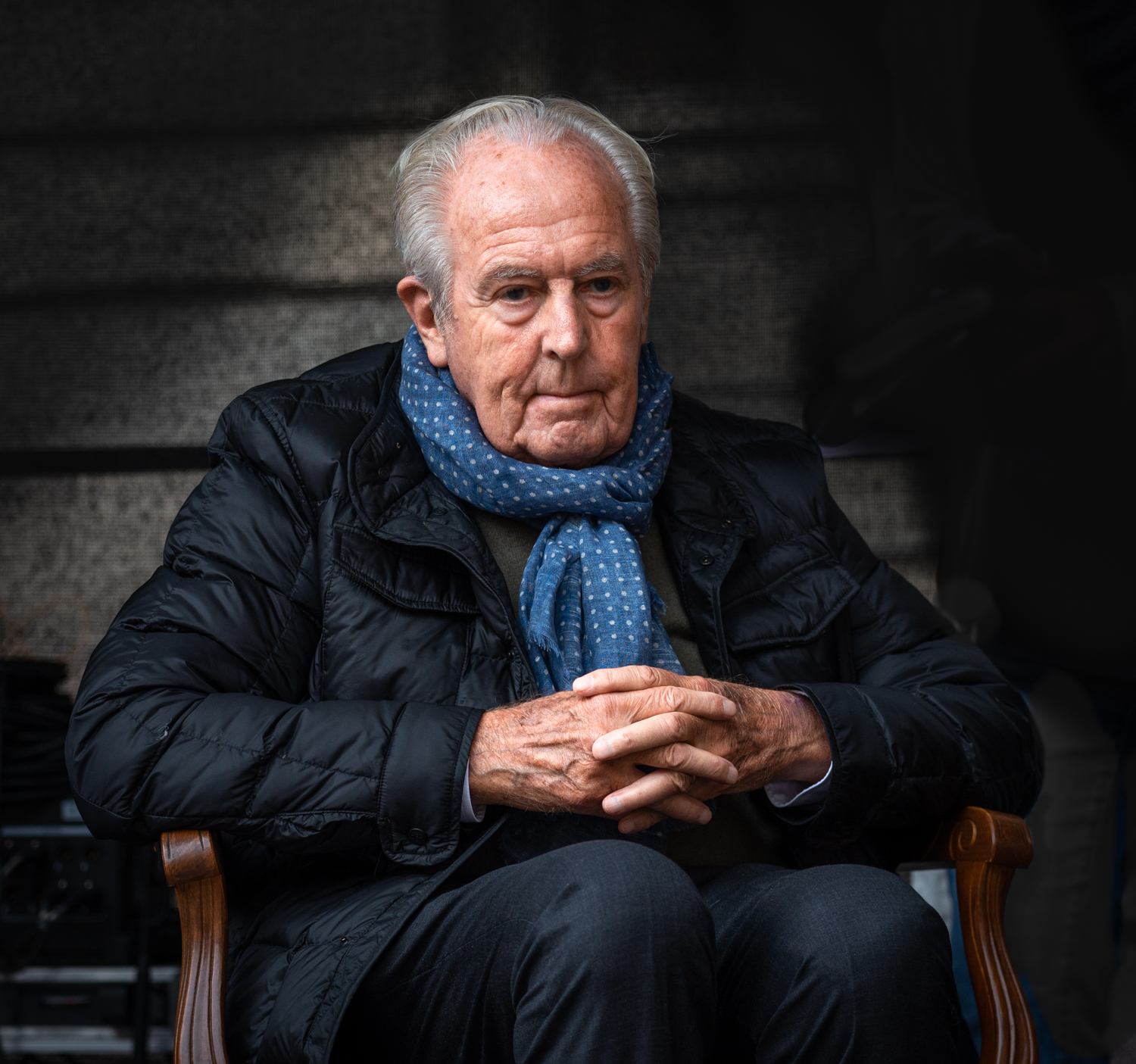
- Born: Jan Gösta Karlsson; 25 June 1941 (age 85); Nyköping, Sweden
- Education: Stockholm School of Economics
- Occupation: Businessman

Jan Gösta Carlzon, né Karlsson (born 25 June 1941) is a Swedish businessman. He is most noted for being chief executive officer of SAS Group from 1981 to 1994.

== Early life ==
Carlzon was born on 25 June 1941 in Nyköping, Sweden, the son of Gösta Carlzon and his wife Essie (née Jörgensen). He graduated with an MBA from the Stockholm School of Economics in 1967.

== Career ==
Carlzon started his career in the international hospitality industry at Vingresor AB. Carlzon was Product Manager at Vingresor AB from 1969 to 1971, Director of Marketing at Vingresor/Club 33 AB from 1971 to 1973, and finally CEO from 1974 to 1978. In 1978 he joined Linjeflyg, as its CEO. Carlzon joined the Scandinavian Airlines System in 1980 and served as its CEO from 1994.

=== Challenges at SAS ===
At the time Jan Carlzon took over the helm of SAS, the company was facing large financial difficulties and losing $17 million per annum and had an international reputation for always being late. A 1981 survey showed that SAS was ranked no. 14 of 17 airlines in Europe when it came to punctuality. Furthermore, the company had a reputation for being a very centralized organization, where decisions were hard to come by to the detriment of customers, shareholders, and staff. He revolutionized the airline industry through an unrelenting focus on customer service quality.

One of the first things Jan Carlzon did at SAS was to introduce the world's first separate cabin for Business Class while at the same time doing away with First Class on its European routes.

Within one year of taking over, SAS had become the most punctual airline in Europe and had started an ongoing training program called Putting People First developed by Claus Møller of Time Manager International ('TMI'). The program was focused on delegating responsibility away from management and allowing customer-facing staff to make decisions to resolve any issues on the spot. Jan Carlzon said at the time: "Problems are solved on the spot, as soon as they arise. No front-line employee has to wait for a supervisor's permission.". These changes soon impacted the bottom-line as well and the company made a profit of $54 million in 1982. Several case studies about the turn-around are available and it has been referenced widely in management literature

This decentralisation of the organization led to both a large boost in company morale and the formalization of the training methodology of the program in a joint venture in 1982 with TMI called Scandinavian Service School. Scandinavian Service School since went on to establish offices in all three of the Scandinavian countries as well as Finland and the training program was exported to other airlines including British Airways and Japan Airlines. The flat organizational structure, delegation processes, and empowerment of employees adopted at SAS also led to Carlzon writing a book, Riv pyramiderna! (Swe., which translates into Tear Down the Pyramids), published by Bonnier in Stockholm in 1985 and translated into English in 1987 by Harper Perennial under the title Moments of Truth. The American Management Association, in their 75th anniversary issue of their magazine in 1998 called this one of the most important developments in management of the 20th century.

The changes at SAS led to Air Transport World naming SAS the Airline of the Year for 1983 in early 1984.

Carlzon also oversaw a complete corporate identity re-design, a process which was marred when a journalist gained unlawful access to a hangar with a plane painted in a proposed livery was photographed and widely published in Scandinavian newspapers. Unfortunately, either the brief to the agency, Landor Associates, was not good enough or they had misunderstood it and painted the plane with 5 crowns to symbolize the 5 Nordic countries. This caused a huge public furore as SAS only contains the airlines of the three monarchies Denmark, Norway, and Sweden. Incidentally, the other two Nordic countries, Finland and Iceland, are both republics and would therefore not be represented by crowns. The task of re-developing the corporate identity was later given to another firm.

In the latter years of Carlzon's tenure at SAS he was coming under increased pressure from shareholders as competitors had caught up with the lead established by SAS in the business market in the early 1980s. At the same time increasing oil prices and a less than profitable first class operation led to SAS scrapping First Class on its intercontinental routes and retiring its Boeing 747s from service, a task completed in 1987. SAS has never since flown aircraft with as large a capacity as it does not believe the flights would be profitable.

=== After SAS ===
Carlzon left SAS in November 1993 and founded the investment company Ledstiernan in 1994 where he was chairman. Carlzon was also one of the founders of the Internet retail company CDON AB. In 1999 he (who is an avid tennis player in his spare time) became chair of the Swedish Tennis Association and a board member in the International Tennis Federation. He served as chair of the British Swedish Chamber of Commerce between 2003 and 2006 and, until June 2010, he chaired the entrepreneurs' organization Företagarna. He was also one of the founders of European telecoms company NETnet International S.A. and is part owner and chair of Karl Stockman AB, a Swedish investment company.

== Personal life ==
In 1966, he married Agneta Wärn (born 1942), a flight attendant, the daughter of merchant Evert Wärn and Evy (née Axelsson). He is now married to Susanne Bourghardt Carlzon (born 1959). He has three children in his first marriage and two children in his second marriage.

== Quotes ==
- "We have 50,000 moments of truth every day." – said at the start of the First Wave seminars to turn SAS around in 1982 and referring to every time an employee of the company came into contact with a customer.
- "An individual without information can't take responsibility. An individual with information can't help but take responsibility."
- "I learned that, before you reach an objective, you must be ready with a new one, and you must start to communicate it to the organization. But it is not the goal itself that is important."
- "Mistakes can usually be corrected later; the time that is lost in not making a decision can never be retrieved".
- "... the right to make mistakes is not equivalent to the right to be incompetent, especially not as a manager."

== Honors and awards ==
=== Awards ===
- (Sweden) H. M. The King's Medal, 12th size gold (silver-gilt) medal worn around the neck on the Order of the Seraphim ribbon (1988)
- (Norway) Commander with Star of the Royal Norwegian Order of Merit (1 July 1990)

=== Honors ===
- Honorary Doctor of Laws from Pepperdine University
- Honorary Doctor of Laws from Pacific Lutheran University (11 September 1991)
- Fellowship in the Norwegian Academy of Technological Sciences

== Filmography ==
- Sällskapsresan 2 – Snowroller (1985) - waiter
- The Proof of the Pudding... (1983) - himself

== Bibliography ==
- Carlzon, Jan; Lagerström, Tomas (1985). Riv pyramiderna!: en bok om den nya människan, chefen och ledaren (in Swedish). Stockholm: Bonnier. ISBN 9100468444. SELIBR 8345131.
- Carlzon, Jan (1987). Moments of truth. Cambridge, Mass.: Ballinger. ISBN 0-88730-200-9. SELIBR 6254131.
