= Carnegie =

Carnegie may refer to:

== People ==
- Carnegie (surname), including a list of people with the name
  - Andrew Carnegie, Scottish-American industrialist and philanthropist
    - Carnegie family, a wealthy American family
  - Dale Carnegie, author
- Clan Carnegie, a lowland Scottish clan

== Institutions ==
=== Named for Andrew Carnegie ===
- Carnegie Building (Troy, New York), on the campus of Rensselaer Polytechnic Institute
- Carnegie College, in Dunfermline, Scotland, a former further education college
- Carnegie Community Centre, in downtown Vancouver, British Columbia
- Carnegie Council for Ethics in International Affairs
- Carnegie Endowment for International Peace, a global think tank with headquarters in Washington, DC, and four other centers, including:
  - Carnegie Middle East Center, in Beirut
  - Carnegie Europe, in Brussels
  - Carnegie Moscow Center
- Carnegie Foundation (disambiguation), any of several foundations
- Carnegie Hall, a concert hall in New York City
- Carnegie Hall, Inc., a regional cultural center in Lewisburg, West Virginia
- Carnegie Hero Fund
- Carnegie Institution for Science, also called Carnegie Institution of Washington (CIW)
- Carnegie library, libraries built with grants paid by Carnegie
- Carnegie Medal (literary award), a British award for children's literature
- Carnegie Mellon University
  - Carnegie Institute of Technology (CIT), now part of the Carnegie Mellon University
- Carnegie Museum of Art, in Pittsburgh, Pennsylvania, which awards the
  - Carnegie Prize
- Carnegie Museum of Natural History, featuring the famous Dinosaur Hall
  - Carnegie collection, a series of educational figures based on the exhibits in Dinosaur Hall
- Carnegie Steel Company
- Carnegie United Kingdom Trust, a charitable foundation

=== Named for industrialist David Carnegie ===
- Carnegie Investment Bank, Swedish investment bank
  - Carnegie Art Award, a Swedish art prize

== Places ==
=== Australia ===
- Carnegie, Victoria, a suburb of Melbourne, Australia
  - Carnegie railway station, Melbourne
- Lake Carnegie (Western Australia)

=== United States ===
- Carnegie, California, a former populated place
- Carnegie, Georgia
- Carnegie, Minnesota
- Carnegie, New York
- Carnegie, Oklahoma
- Carnegie, Pennsylvania
- Carnegie, Wisconsin
- Lake Carnegie (New Jersey), at Princeton University

== Other ==
- Carnegie (horse) (1991–2012), a Thoroughbred racehorse and sire
- Carnegie (yacht), a brigantine yacht launched in 1909, destroyed in 1929, a non-magnetic survey ship of the Carnegie Institution
- Carnegie Deli, in New York City
- Carnegie stages of embryonic development
- Carnegie State Vehicular Recreation Area, in California
- Leeds Carnegie, a brand name used by several sports teams
- USS Carnegie (CVE-38), or HMS Empress, a World War II escort aircraft carrier

== See also ==
- Carnegie station (disambiguation)
