= Stig Vilhelmson =

Swedish businessman (born 1956)

Stig Vilhelmson (born 1956) was a Swedish businessman who was the former chief executive officer of investment bank Carnegie. Vilhemson started at Carnegie 1991 and replaced Karin Forseke as CEO at the time of the Annual General Meeting in 2006. At the same time Christer Zetterberg replaced Lars Bertmar, a former CEO, as Chairman.

Vilhelmson was forced to resign from his post in 2007 following a trading scandal, when the Swedish regulatory body issued a report demanding the replacement of Carnegie's CEO and board.
