= Exhibition of Contemporary Scandinavian Art (1912–1913) =

1912–1913 touring exhibition of Scandinavian art in the United States

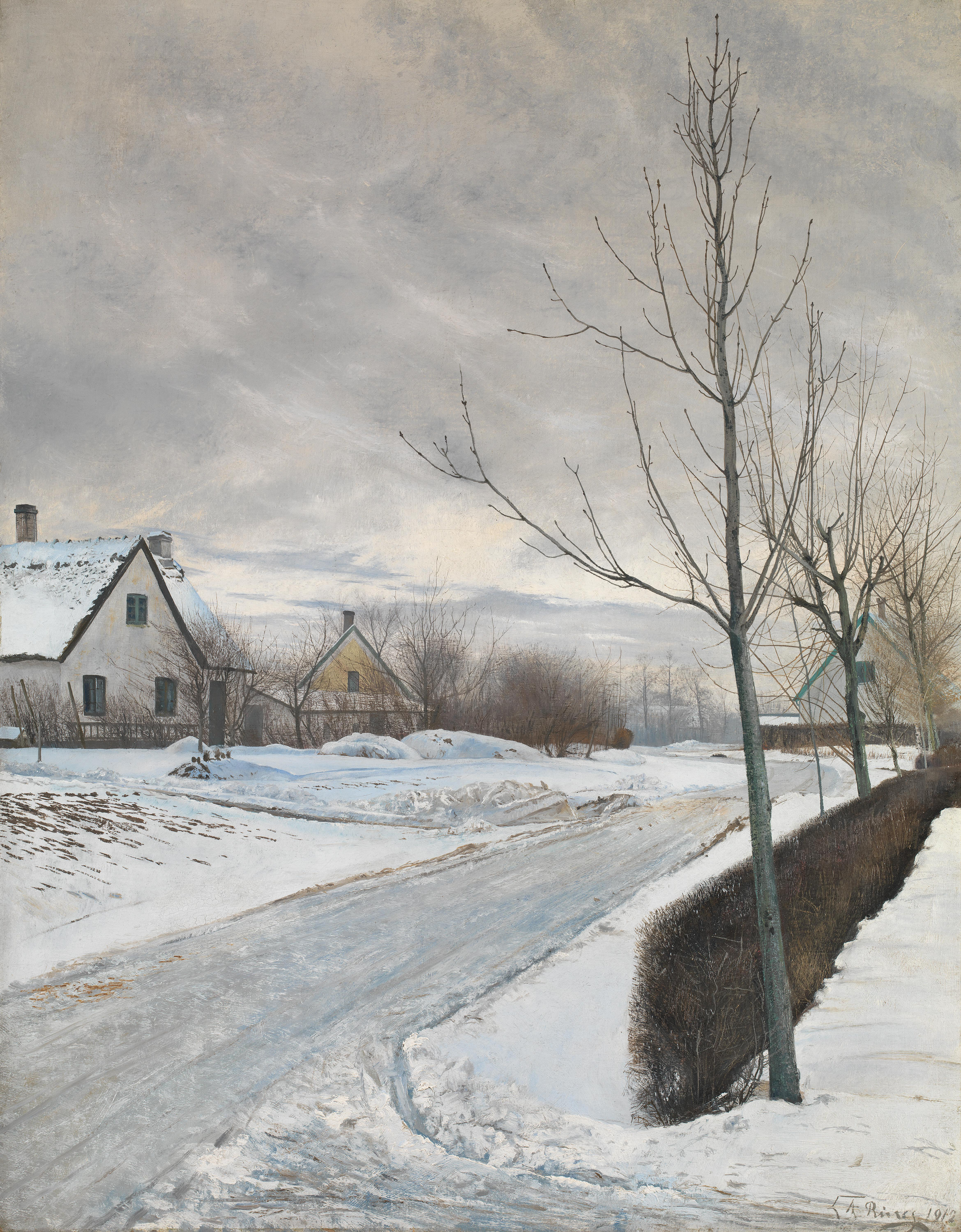
- L. A. Ring's Winter Day (1912), catalogue no. 86; the frame was made for the American tour.
- 1912–1913 touring exhibition of Scandinavian art in the United States
- Location: New York City; Buffalo, New York; Toledo, Ohio; Chicago; Boston
- Opened: December 10, 1912
- Closed: April 21, 1913
- Curator: Christian Brinton, with Carl G. Laurin, Karl Madsen, and Jens Thiis
- Organiser: American-Scandinavian Society

The Exhibition of Contemporary Scandinavian Art was an exhibition of art from Denmark, Norway, and Sweden that toured five cities in the United States from December 10, 1912, to April 21, 1913. Organized by the American-Scandinavian Society and financed by the American-Scandinavian Foundation, it opened at the American Art Galleries in New York City and then traveled to the Albright Art Gallery in Buffalo, the Toledo Museum of Art, the Art Institute of Chicago, and the Museum of Fine Arts, Boston.

The published catalogue contained 169 numbered entries: 148 paintings or drawings and 21 objects in other media. Its 39 painters and draughtspeople comprised 38 men and one woman, the Swedish artist Anna Boberg. Included were four tapestries associated with Gustaf Fjæstad, sculpture by David Edström and Carl Milles, wood carvings by Axel Petersson, and five groups of Royal Copenhagen porcelain. The artists ranged from internationally established figures such as Edvard Munch, Anders Zorn, Carl Larsson, Bruno Liljefors, and Vilhelm Hammershøi to younger modernists including Harald Giersing, Edvard Weie, Sigurd Swane, and Per Krohg.

The organizers presented the exhibition as a coordinated survey of the three contemporary national schools. Society president John A. Gade and critic Christian Brinton traveled in Scandinavia to assemble the loans, aided by Carl G. and Thorsten Laurin in Sweden, Karl Madsen and Otto Benzon in Denmark, and Jens Thiis in Norway. The Norwegian painter Henrik Lund accompanied the works throughout the tour as artistic director. The kings of Sweden, Denmark, and Norway served as royal patrons, and government officials, artists, museums, and private collectors assisted with loans and transport.

The tour became an early point of contact between Nordic modernism and North American artists. The American-Scandinavian Foundation later identified it as the first presentation of Munch's paintings in the United States. Canadian painters Lawren Harris and J. E. H. MacDonald saw the Buffalo installation in January 1913 and returned to Toronto with an annotated catalogue; accounts of the Group of Seven treat the visit as a stimulus for their effort to construct a Canadian landscape tradition. In Chicago, 69,094 people attended during an eighteen-day run. The local press debated the exhibition's modernist works in the weeks before the Armory Show reached the same museum, and the Art Institute removed Bernhard Folkestad's Summer Day from display after objections to its subject.

== Background ==
The American-Scandinavian Society had been established to strengthen relations between the United States and the Scandinavian countries, connect Scandinavian Americans, and promote knowledge of Scandinavian culture. The American-Scandinavian Foundation was a separate, self-governing institution formed to administer an endowment of more than $500,000 given by Niels Poulson. The Foundation's grant to the Society financed the exhibition. The catalogue emphasized that coordinated exhibitions of art from all three kingdoms were uncommon even in Scandinavia and stated that most of the participating artists had not previously exhibited in the United States.

Scandinavian art had reached American audiences through international expositions, national displays, commercial galleries, and exhibitions devoted to individual countries, but the 1912–1913 project was planned as a single survey of current Swedish, Danish, and Norwegian production. Writing while the tour was under way, Brinton contrasted it with earlier, more limited presentations and argued that American viewers needed to see modern European art in coherent groups instead of isolated examples. His catalogue placed Munch and J. F. Willumsen among the precursors of contemporary European modernism while also giving extensive space to naturalism, national romanticism, portraiture, animal painting, domestic interiors, and landscape.

The exhibition opened shortly before the International Exhibition of Modern Art, commonly known as the Armory Show, transformed the public discussion of European modernism in the United States. The two projects were independent and differed substantially in range: the Scandinavian exhibition was restricted to living artists from three northern European countries, whereas the Armory Show combined historical precursors, European avant-garde movements, and American art. Their schedules nevertheless brought the Scandinavian show to Chicago while newspapers there were reporting on the Armory Show's New York opening. This proximity shaped the Chicago response to the more experimental paintings by Munch, Giersing, Weie, Per Krohg, and other participants.

== Planning and organization ==
=== Selection network ===
Gade traveled to Scandinavia in spring 1912 to secure official and artistic support. Brinton accompanied him as adviser and selector. A July 11 circular reported that Gade had returned after a two-month journey and that Brinton would remain abroad for several months to finish the selection and prepare a standardized illustrated catalogue. In Sweden, the brothers Carl G. Laurin and Thorsten Laurin assisted with artists and loans. In Copenhagen, the chief advisers were Karl Madsen, director of the Royal Gallery, and the collector Otto Benzon. Jens Thiis, director of the National Gallery in Christiania (now Oslo), performed the corresponding role in Norway.

The catalogue thanked lenders whose participation allowed the selectors to borrow works that were no longer in artists' studios. They included Carl Piltz of Stockholm; Baron Rosenkrantz of Rosenholm; Alfred Bramsen of Copenhagen; Mrs. Joseph T. Jones and the Albright Art Gallery in Buffalo; Hugo Reisinger; and Robert W. de Forest. The loans came from artists, private collections, and a public art gallery.

The project used “Scandinavian” in the narrower contemporary sense of Denmark, Norway, and Sweden: no Finnish or Icelandic section was included. The 2011–2012 centenary exhibition at Scandinavia House broadened its geographical scope to include works from Finland and Iceland, explicitly distinguishing the later Nordic framework from that of 1912.

=== Patronage, transport, and administration ===
Kings Gustaf V, Christian X, and Haakon VII accepted honorary patronage for their respective national sections. The catalogue and the preliminary circular credited the three governments with administrative assistance. Alexander E. Johnson offered to transport the works from Scandinavia to the United States and return them without charge. The Copenhagen shipping agent V. Jastrau and Stockholm agent Percy Tottie helped collect and dispatch the loans. Henrik Lund traveled with the shipment as artistic director—called the montreur in the circular—and supervised installation during the tour.

The preliminary schedule set aside December 10–25 for New York, January 2–26 for Buffalo, February 1–16 for Toledo, February 22–March 16 for Chicago, and March 24–April 21 for Boston. The actual Buffalo opening was January 4, and the Chicago opening moved to February 27; the other opening and closing dates remained as announced. Admission in New York was set at 50 cents on weekdays and 25 cents on Sundays, while the four museum venues outside New York planned free admission. Society members received one nontransferable New York ticket and could purchase ten additional tickets for two dollars.

== Catalogue and visual design ==
The New York catalogue was a 176-page volume printed by Redfield Brothers. Its first impression comprised 6,000 copies. After an introductory note on the Society and Foundation, Brinton supplied a sixteen-page general essay. Three national surveys followed: Carl G. Laurin wrote on Sweden, Karl Madsen on Denmark, and Jens Thiis on Norway. The numbered lists, biographical notes, and plate section occupied most of the remaining pages; eleven pages of advertisements closed the volume.

Title page of the catalogue, whose first impression was of 6,000 copies.

The catalogue's decorative program drew on designs by the Danish architect and designer Thorvald Bindesbøll. Karl Madsen authorized their use, and Bindesbøll's former pupil Svend Hammershøi, brother of Vilhelm Hammershøi, adapted and arranged them for the publication. Gunnar Hallström designed the exhibition poster. The organizers therefore treated graphic design as part of the presentation of Scandinavian art, although Bindesbøll himself had died in 1908 and had no numbered object in the exhibition.

Laurin's Swedish essay centered the generation that emerged around the artists' opposition movement of the 1880s and the distinct careers of Zorn, Larsson, Liljefors, Prince Eugen, Fjæstad, and their contemporaries. Madsen's Danish essay traced continuity from the early nineteenth-century Danish school to the direct observation, domestic scale, and formal restraint he saw in modern painters. Thiis presented Norwegian painting as the youngest of the three national schools, following its development from Johan Christian Dahl and the Düsseldorf-trained generation through naturalism, neo-romantic landscape, and the art of Munch. Together, the essays arranged the works within three national genealogies and supplied the historical framework through which the catalogue asked American visitors to view them.

Brinton's introduction repeatedly used "race" and inherited national character as explanatory categories. He linked geography, language, religion, folklore, museum collecting, and artistic style to a shared northern identity, then distinguished Swedish, Danish, and Norwegian traits within it. Art historian Mechella Yezernitskaya has analyzed this framework as a form of pan-Scandinavian essentialism that Brinton later adapted in his writing and collecting on Russian art. Yezernitskaya treats the terminology as evidence of Brinton's early-twentieth-century essentialism; it is not part of current art-historical method.

== Tour ==
Exhibition itinerary
City	Venue	Public dates	Notes
New York City	American Art Galleries	December 10–25, 1912	Opening venue; admission charged
Buffalo, New York	Albright Art Gallery	January 4–26, 1913	First museum venue
Toledo, Ohio	Toledo Museum of Art	February 1–16, 1913	Dates retained from preliminary schedule
Chicago	Art Institute of Chicago	February 27–March 16, 1913	69,094 visitors
Boston	Museum of Fine Arts, Boston	March 24–April 21, 1913	Final venue

=== New York ===
The exhibition opened at the American Art Galleries on December 10, 1912, and remained through Christmas Day. The commercial-gallery setting differed from the four subsequent nonprofit museum installations, and it was the only stop for which the preliminary circular announced admission charges. The New York title page became the standard title page for the touring catalogue, while the front matter listed all five cities and the three royal patrons.

The catalogue's introductory note framed the opening as an educational project for both the general public and Americans of Scandinavian descent. It claimed that the tour brought the work of most of the represented artists before an American audience for the first time. Later American-Scandinavian Foundation publications have treated the six Munch paintings—The Sick Child, Portrait of Hermann Schlittgen, In the Garden, Summer Night, Starlit Night, and In the Orchard—as Munch's first presentation in the United States.

=== Buffalo and Toledo ===
The Albright Art Gallery received the exhibition on January 4, 1913, and displayed it through January 26. Its institutional record identifies the royal patronage, the complete five-city route, and the 176-page catalogue. The Buffalo installation became especially consequential in Canadian art history because Toronto painters Lawren Harris and J. E. H. MacDonald crossed the border to see it during January.

The Toledo Museum of Art presented the works from February 1 through February 16. The surviving library record catalogs the exhibition under its Scandinavian painting and sculpture holdings and preserves the same dates given in the July 1912 circular. Toledo therefore formed the shortest transfer between two stops: the Buffalo exhibition closed on January 26, and the Toledo opening followed six days later.

=== Chicago ===
The Art Institute of Chicago opened the exhibition on February 27 and closed it on March 16. The installation ran while Chicago newspapers were publishing reports and caricatures about the Armory Show, which had opened in New York on February 17 and would arrive at the Art Institute on March 24. Commentary on the Scandinavian works consequently became entangled with a broader dispute over post-impressionism, expressionism, cubism, and the limits of public exhibition.

The show drew 69,094 visitors. Sunday, March 9, was its busiest day, with 12,816 people entering the galleries. These numbers made the Scandinavian exhibition a major public event in its own right before the Armory Show opened in Chicago eight days after it closed.

=== Boston ===
The Museum of Fine Arts opened the final installation on March 24 and retained it through April 21. The Boston catalogue record lists the full 176-page publication, preserving the continuity of the same catalogue and numbering system through the end of the tour. When the Boston display closed, the works had been in transit or on public view in the United States for more than four months.

== Contents ==
=== Scale and media ===
The catalogue numbered its principal sequence from 1 through 165 and inserted four late additions as 37A, 40A, 46A, and 126A, producing 169 entries. Sweden accounted for 61 entries, Denmark for 57, and Norway for 51. The University of Vienna's Database of Modern Exhibitions classifies 148 entries as paintings or drawings and 21 as other media. Sixteen of the non-painting entries appeared in the Swedish section—four tapestries, nine sculptures or sculptural studies, and three wood carvings—and five Royal Copenhagen porcelain entries closed the Danish section.

The distribution of works was uneven by artist. Fjæstad had twelve entries, Hammershøi eleven, Carl Larsson ten, Willumsen eight, Carl Milles eight, Boberg seven, Zorn seven, and Munch six. Several artists were represented by a single work. The range allowed the catalogue to build compact individual surveys for some painters while using isolated examples to signal younger tendencies. Brinton explicitly identified Giersing, Swane, Weie, and Per Krohg as among the exhibition's more advanced artists.

Anna Boberg was the only woman among the 39 painters and draughtspeople. Her seven Lofoten subjects opened the Swedish catalogue and included changing weather, fishing settlements, boats, and work at sea. The remaining 38 painters and draughtspeople were men; the creators represented in sculpture, carving, and porcelain were also men or institutional workshops. The count makes the gender imbalance visible without diminishing the substantial place given to Boberg within the Swedish section.

=== Selection and arrangement ===
The Swedish section moved from Boberg's and Prince Eugen's landscapes through Fjæstad's winter imagery, Hallström's rural scenes, Hesselbom's monumental landscapes, Larsson's domestic watercolors, Liljefors's animal subjects, and Zorn's portraits and figure paintings. It concluded with sculpture and wood carving. The sequence placed internationally familiar painters beside decorative and craft media that supported the catalogue's broader account of Swedish visual culture.

The Danish section opened with the young Harald Giersing and then devoted eleven entries to Hammershøi's architecture, interiors, and portraits. It continued through portraiture, bird and animal painting, landscapes, and domestic scenes, and culminated in Willumsen's large-scale symbolist and figure compositions. Five Royal Copenhagen porcelain entries formed a short decorative-arts coda. Hammershøi's eleven entries and Willumsen's eight were the two largest groups in the Danish section.

The Norwegian section combined coastal and mountain landscape, portraiture, figure painting, still life, and modern decorative work. Catalogue numbers 131–147 formed a continuous sequence of works by Christian Krohg, Per Krohg, Henrik Lund, and Munch; the remaining entries included portraits, coastal and mountain landscapes, still lifes, and Dagfin Werenskiold's decorative panel. The six Munch paintings included versions or subjects from different phases of his career, placing The Sick Child beside portraits, garden scenes, orchards, and nocturnal landscapes instead of reducing his representation to a single signature image.

=== Complete catalogue ===
The tables retain the English titles and media printed in 1912, with minor normalization of capitalization and punctuation. Artist names follow current English-language forms where these differ from the catalogue: examples include Fjæstad for "Fjaestad", Weie for "Weihe", and Petersson for "Pettersson". The entries record the works as catalogued; a shared title does not establish that two similarly named works are the same object.

==== Sweden ====
Complete numbered catalogue
Catalogue no(s).	Artist or maker	Works and stated media
1–7	Anna Boberg	1. Sunlight and Showers; 2. At Rest, Sunday; 3. Dragonheads; 4. After the Day's Work; 5. Boats and Fisher Huts; 6. Not a Ripple; 7. Putting Out to Sea
8–9	Prince Eugen	8. Swedish Summer Night; 9. After Rain
10–21	Gustaf Fjæstad	10. Winter Morning; 11. Part of Waterfall; 12. Hoarfrost; 13. Meditation; 14. September Night; 15. Ripples; 16. Sun and Snow; 17. Running Water; 18. Winter Night (tapestry); 19. Running Water (tapestry); 20. Thaw (tapestry); 21. Below the Falls (tapestry)
22–24	Gunnar Hallström	22. On the Frozen Snow; 23. The Gladness of the Earth; 24. On the Border of the Field
25–28	Otto Hesselbom	25. My Country; 26. View over Lake Arran; 27. My Parental Home; 28. Evening Landscape, Lake Arran
29–37A	Carl Larsson	29. Myself; 30. My Wife; 31. Shelling Peas; 32. The Love Park; 33. In Mother's Bed; 34. Theatrical Cogitations; 35. In the Snow; 36. Nerium; 37. Kersti at the Window; 37A. In the Study
38–40A	Bruno Liljefors	38. Foxes; 39. The Hunter; 40. Fox Shooting; 40A. Birds in the Snow
41–46A	Anders Zorn	41. Mona; 42. Matins on Christmas Day; 43. Djos-Matts, Clockmaker of Mora; 44. Skeri-kulla; 45. At the Window; 46. Dagmar; 46A. Hall Kesti
47	David Edström	47. Ernest Thiel, Esq. (bronze)
48–55	Carl Milles	48. Dancing Girl (marble); 49. Dancing Girl with Drapery (marble); 50. Lost in Thought (polychrome marble); 51. After Six o'Clock (bronze); 52. At the Farrier's (bronze); 53. Elephants—Study (bronze); 54. Dutch Milkmaid (bronze); 55. Six Studies from Holland (silver)
56–58	Axel Petersson	56. The Christening (wood); 57. At the Photographer's (wood); 58. The Burial (wood)

==== Denmark ====
Complete numbered catalogue
Catalogue no(s).	Artist or maker	Works and stated media
59	Harald Giersing	59. Girl with Blue Skirt
60–70	Vilhelm Hammershøi	60. Western Portal, Christiansborg Castle; 61. The Church, Christiansborg Castle; 62. The Young Virtuoso, Mr. Henry Bramsen; 63. Sunbeams; 64. Kronborg, Hamlet's Castle; 65. Open Doors; 66. Montague Street, London; 67. Entrance to Asiatic Company, Copenhagen; 68. The Balcony Door; 69. Bedroom; 70. Drawing-room, Lady Reading
71–72	Aksel Jørgensen	71. Portrait; 72. Portrait of Young Man
73–74	Knud Kyhn	73. Ducks in Flight; 74. Mowgli in the Jungle
75–78	Johannes Larsen	75. At the Window; 76. Peahen and Young; 77. Summer by the Sea; 78. Goldfinch in Cage
79–80	Viggo Madsen	79. Portrait of My Mother; 80. View from My Bedroom Window
81–83	Ejnar Nielsen	81. Evening Bells; 82. Portrait; 83. Brittany Woman
84	Julius Paulsen	84. Portrait of Baron Rosenkrantz
85–89	L. A. Ring	85. The Postman; 86. Winter Day; 87. The Farewell; 88. Karrebæksminde; 89. Marshland
90–93	Karl Schou	90. Miss B. at the Piano; 91. The Farm; 92. Farmyard After Rain; 93. In the Garden
94–96	Sigurd Swane	94. Four Artists; 95. Early Spring; 96. The Forest, Afternoon
97–100	Fritz Syberg	97. The First Day of Spring; 98. September Sunshine; 99. Gulls at Meilø; 100. Sunshine and Mist, Kattegat
101–102	Edvard Weie	101. Portrait of My Mother; 102. Flower Market, Copenhagen
103–110	J. F. Willumsen	103. Youth and Sunshine; 104. The Painter and His Family; 105. A Mother's Dream; 106. The Mountain Climber; 107. Paseo de las Delicias, Sevilla; 108. Plaza de San Fernando, Sevilla; 109. Señora de Valencia; 110. Summer Night, Denmark
111–115	Royal Copenhagen porcelain; designs by Vilhelm Fischer and C. Mortensen	111. Vase, Pelican Motive (porcelain; Fischer); 112. Vase, Heron Motive (porcelain; Fischer); 113. Vase, Danish Landscape Motive (porcelain; Mortensen); 114. Vase, Crow Motive (porcelain; Mortensen); 115. Small Pieces, Various Motives (porcelain)

==== Norway ====
Complete numbered catalogue
Catalogue no(s).	Artist or maker	Works and stated media
116–117	Edvard Diriks	116. Clouds Mirrored in the Sea; 117. Pine Trees by the Fjord
118–120	Thorvald Erichsen	118. Twilight; 119. Snow After Sunset; 120. Red Cliffs
121–122	Bernhard Folkestad	121. Still-life; 122. Summer Day
123–126A	Thorolf Holmboe	123. Mountains, Lofoten; 124. Landscape with Pine Trees; 125. Autumn; 126. View of Christiania Fjord; 126A. Landscape
127	Ludvig Karsten	127. Still-life
128–130	Arne Kavli	128. In the Pine Forest; 129. Grey Day; 130. Northern Summer Night
131–133	Christian Krohg	131. Portrait of Myself; 132. Dangerous Waters; 133. "Look Out!"
134–135	Per Krohg	134. Danse; 135. Carnival
136–141	Henrik Lund	136. Andreas and Margit; 137. Portrait of Hans Jæger; 138. Portrait of Herman Gade, Esq.; 139. Portrait of Gunnar Heiberg; 140. Landscape; 141. Portrait of Finn Rønn
142–147	Edvard Munch	142. The Sick Child; 143. Portrait of Hermann Schlittgen; 144. In the Garden; 145. Summer Night; 146. Starlit Night; 147. In the Orchard
148–150	Søren Onsager	148. Sisters; 149. Girls Asleep; 150. Young Girl
151–152	Eilif Peterssen	151. Osterdalen Sater; 152. Summer Night, Western Norway
153	Christian Skredsvig	153. Astray
154–158	Harald Sohlberg	154. Autumn Landscape; 155. Fisherman's Cottage; 156. Mountains, Winter Landscape; 157. Afternoon; 158. Wagon Road
159	Dagfin Werenskiold	159. Turkey Cock Family (decorative panel)
160–163	Erik Werenskiold	160. Two Little Girls; 161. Norwegian Boy; 162. By the Christiania Fjord; 163. Flowers
164–165	Oluf Wold-Torne	164. Portrait of Self; 165. Flowers

== Reception ==
=== Critical response ===
The surviving reception evidence varies by city. The centenary scholarship edited by Patricia G. Berman reconstructs responses across North America, while Chicago offers the clearest combination of contemporary attendance figures, press commentary, and later institutional study. Reviewers did not treat the exhibition as stylistically uniform. Naturalist, impressionist, symbolist, and expressionist works appeared together, and critics often separated the established reputations of Zorn, Larsson, Liljefors, and Hammershøi from younger or more experimental painters.

In Chicago, poet and Chicago Tribune critic Harriet Monroe found almost all of the Scandinavian works pleasing and singled out Zorn for praise. Another critic, Amy L. Paulding, attacked a small group of modernist paintings as colorless, nightmarish, and deficient by conventional standards. A third newspaper treatment used comic verse to explain the "daub and smear" of the newer styles. The language anticipated attacks soon directed at the Armory Show, demonstrating that the local debate over modernism had already begun before cubist and futurist works reached Chicago.

The sharpest controversy involved Bernhard Folkestad's Summer Day, catalogue no. 122. The painting was removed from the Art Institute's walls after objections characterized in the press as moral. Director William Merchant Richardson French declined to discuss the subject and said that the art committee had ordered the removal. Martinez places the incident within the museum's anxious preparations for the Armory Show; French later characterized the reception of the Scandinavian exhibition as “decidedly violent”.

The eighteen-day Chicago run attracted nearly seventy thousand visits, and more than twelve thousand people attended on March 9 alone. The figures measure attendance, not whether individual visitors approved or rejected the works.

=== Relation to the Armory Show ===
The Scandinavian exhibition closed in Chicago on March 16; the Armory Show's Chicago installation opened on March 24. They did not overlap. Newspapers nevertheless discussed both during the Scandinavian run because the Armory Show was already open in New York. Modernist Scandinavian works therefore served local writers as immediate examples through which to rehearse questions of distorted form, non-naturalistic color, morality, and artistic intention.

The two exhibitions also differed in institutional purpose. The Scandinavian project was organized through cultural diplomacy and national representation, with royal patrons, government assistance, and three country sections. The Armory Show was organized by the Association of American Painters and Sculptors to challenge prevailing exhibition systems and introduce a broad international avant-garde. Their chronological proximity brought them into the same public argument without making the Scandinavian tour a preliminary section of the Armory Show.

== Influence and legacy ==
=== United States ===
The American-Scandinavian Foundation identifies the tour as the first exhibition it presented and as the first American presentation of Munch's paintings. Six works gave viewers a broader sample than a single loan could have provided. The same later institutional history identifies the exhibition as an important encounter for the American painter Marsden Hartley, whose interest in northern European modernism developed further during his subsequent years in Germany.

Brinton continued to organize and write about international modern art. Yezernitskaya connects the national and "racial" interpretive structure of the Scandinavian catalogue to his later promotion of Russian art. In 1917, Gustav V appointed him a first-class member of the Order of Vasa for his role in promoting Swedish art through the 1912 exhibition and a later Swedish exhibition at the Brooklyn Museum.

The tour also left documentary traces in museum and collection histories. L. A. Ring's 1912 Road in the Village of Baldersbrønde (Winter Day), catalogue no. 86 under the shorter title Winter Day, survives in the National Gallery in London with a frame made specifically for the American exhibition. The work and frame preserve evidence of how a Danish painting was prepared for transatlantic display, independent of the catalogue and press record.

=== Canada and the Group of Seven ===
Lawren Harris and J. E. H. MacDonald visited the Buffalo exhibition in January 1913. They studied the Scandinavian landscapes and took an annotated catalogue back to Toronto. David P. Silcox's account for the Art Canada Institute states that the artists recognized visual and environmental parallels between the northern European landscapes and Canada and treated the visit as a turning point in their effort to develop a national landscape movement.

The Group of Seven formed in 1920 after years of shared work, exhibitions, and discussion. Silcox and the centenary scholarship treat the Scandinavian exhibition as one identifiable stimulus: it gave Harris and MacDonald a visible precedent for using snow, forest, rock, coast, changing light, and sparsely populated terrain in a modern national landscape art, and the catalogue could be circulated among their Toronto colleagues.

=== Centenary reassessment ===
The American-Scandinavian Foundation revisited the tour in Luminous Modernism: Scandinavian Art Comes to America, 1912, shown at Scandinavia House in New York from October 25, 2011, to February 11, 2012. The centenary exhibition contained 48 works. Twenty artists had also appeared in 1912, and eight objects were the same works shown on the original tour. Unlike the three-country predecessor, it included Finland and Iceland alongside Denmark, Norway, and Sweden.

Patricia G. Berman led the scholarly project and edited its catalogue. The central reception study, "Wildly, Modestly Modern: The North American Reception of the Scandinavian Exhibition of 1912", examined the original tour as a transatlantic event instead of treating it only as a sequence of national art histories. The centenary project also made it possible to match surviving works, frames, and collection records to the often abbreviated English titles in the 1912 catalogue.

== Identified exhibited works ==
Several objects can be connected securely to catalogue numbers through museum records. Ring's Road in the Village of Baldersbrønde (Winter Day) is no. 86, Winter Day. Vilhelm Hammershøi's View of Christiansborg Palace. Late Autumn, painted in 1890–1892, appeared as no. 60, Western Portal, Christiansborg Castle. Edvard Weie's 1908 Portrait of the Artist's Mother appeared as no. 101, Portrait of My Mother. These identifications show that some catalogue titles were shortened or translated for the American audience.

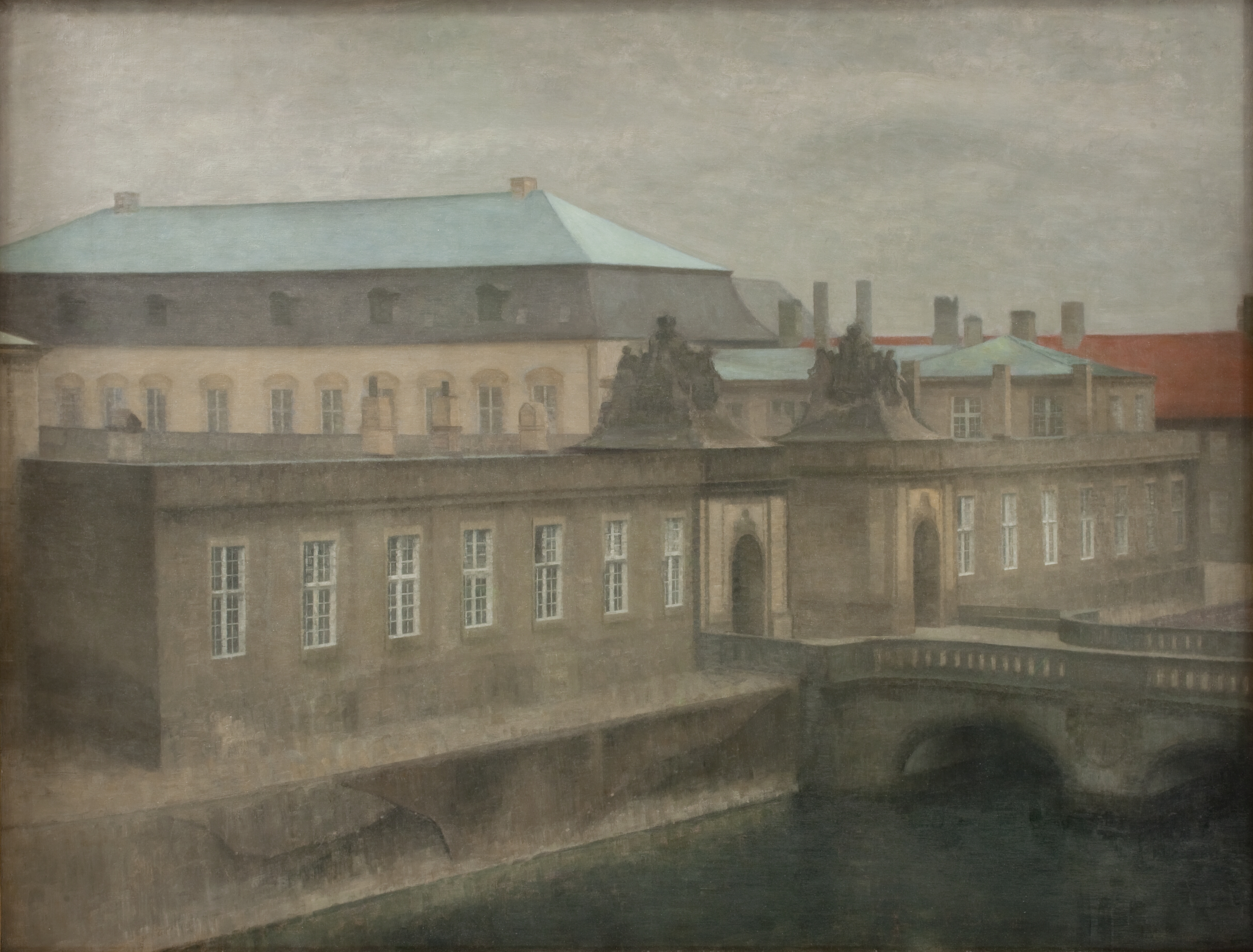
Vilhelm Hammershøi, View of Christiansborg Palace. Late Autumn (1890–1892), catalogue no. 60, Western Portal, Christiansborg Castle

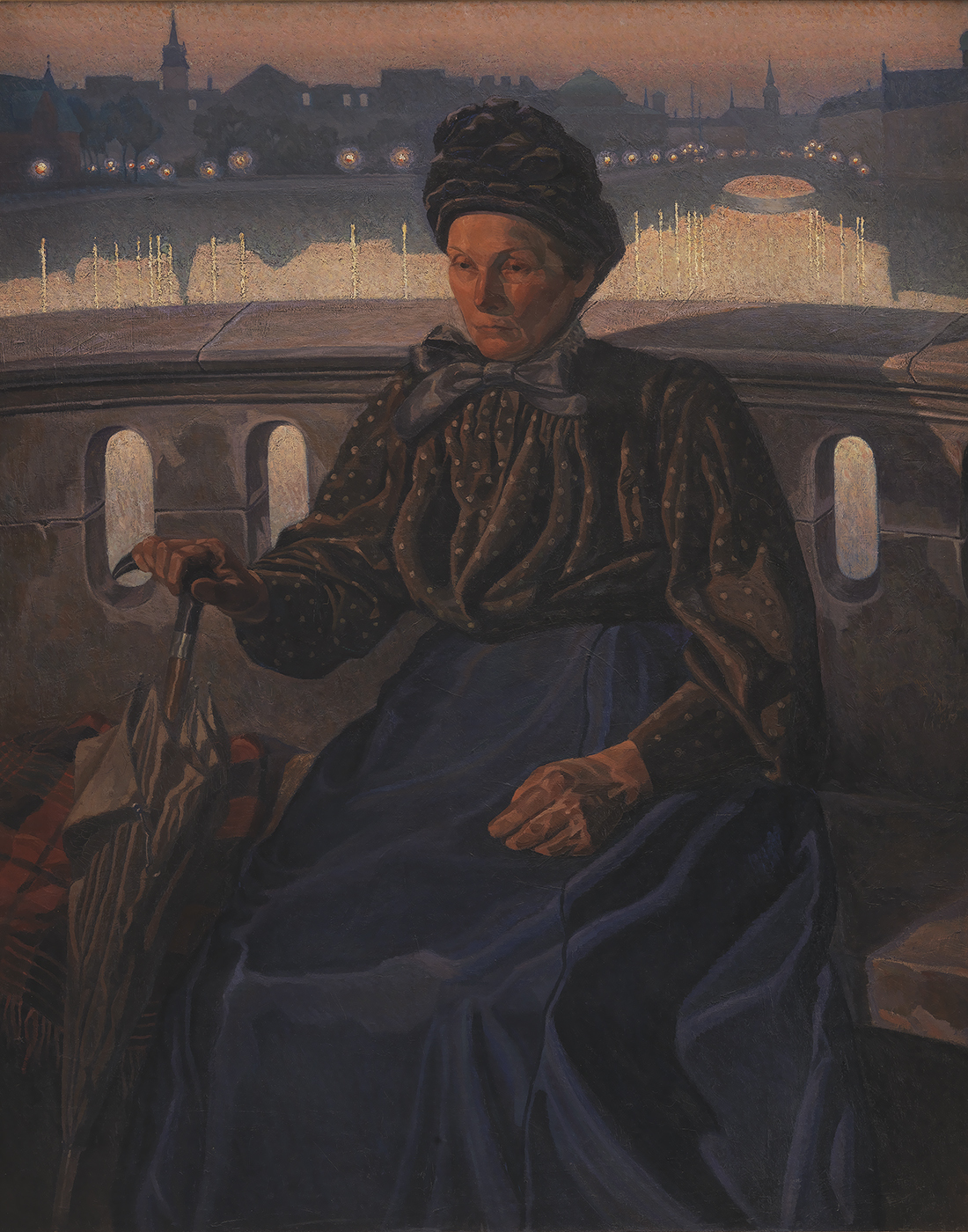
Edvard Weie, Portrait of the Artist's Mother (1908), catalogue no. 101, Portrait of My Mother

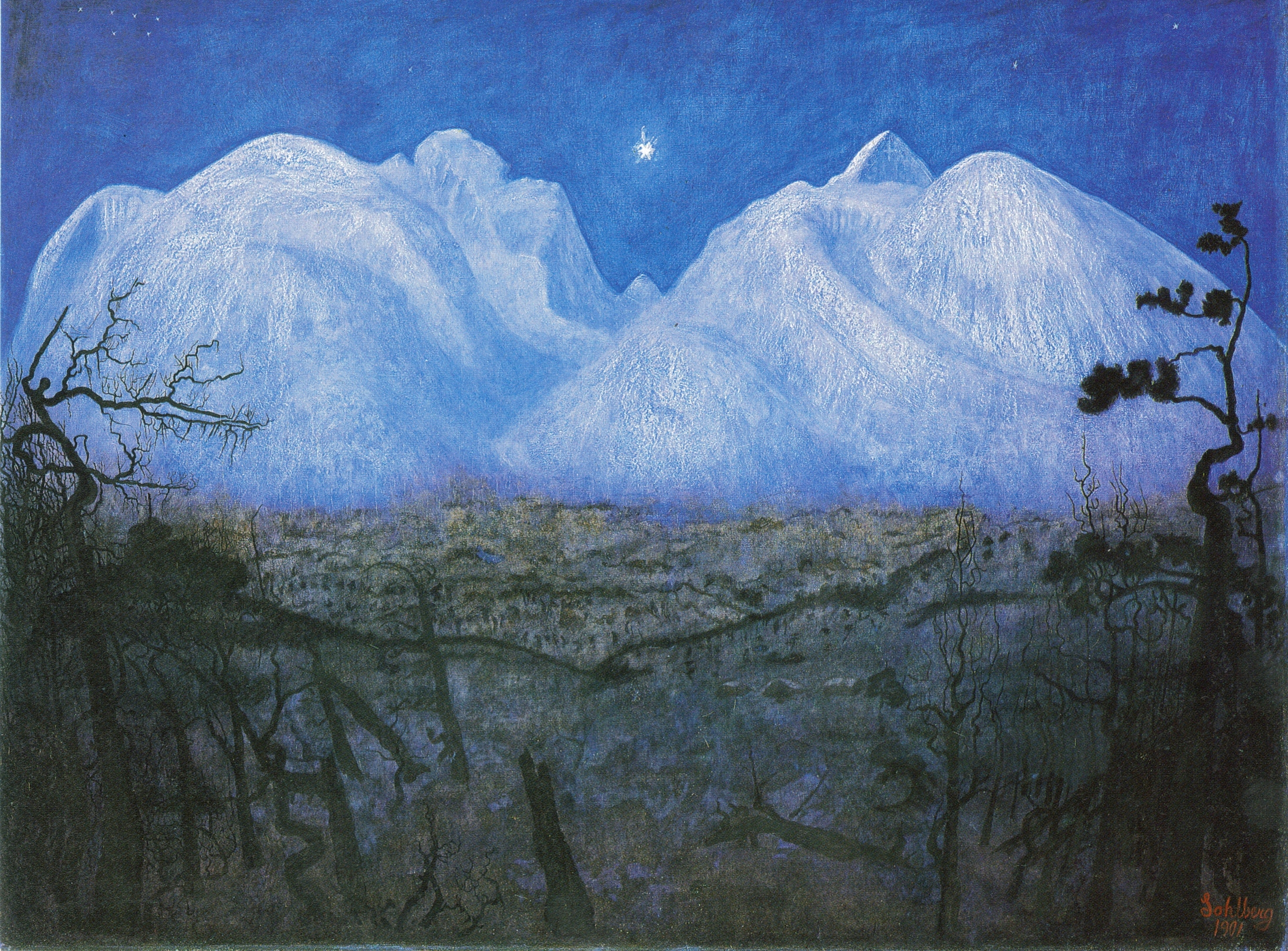
Harald Sohlberg, a 1901 version of the Winter Night in the Mountains motif; catalogue no. 156 was titled Mountains, Winter Landscape

The Sohlberg image represents the motif and period but is not securely identified as the exact canvas listed as no. 156. Sohlberg developed the Rondane subject through numerous paintings, drawings, and later prints between his first studies in 1899 and the large final version of 1914. The distinction is necessary because a shared catalogue title or motif does not establish object identity.

== See also ==
- Art of Denmark
- Norwegian art
- Swedish art
- Nordic art
- Armory Show
- Group of Seven (artists)
