= Nordic art =

Art made in the Nordic countries

Nordic art is the art made in the Nordic countries: Denmark, Faroe Islands, Finland, Iceland, Norway, Sweden, and associated territories. Scandinavian art refers to a subset of Nordic art and is art specific for the Scandinavian countries Denmark, Sweden and Norway.

Norse art, the art of the Vikings, is a form of Nordic art from a particular period of time.

== History ==
=== Viking age ===
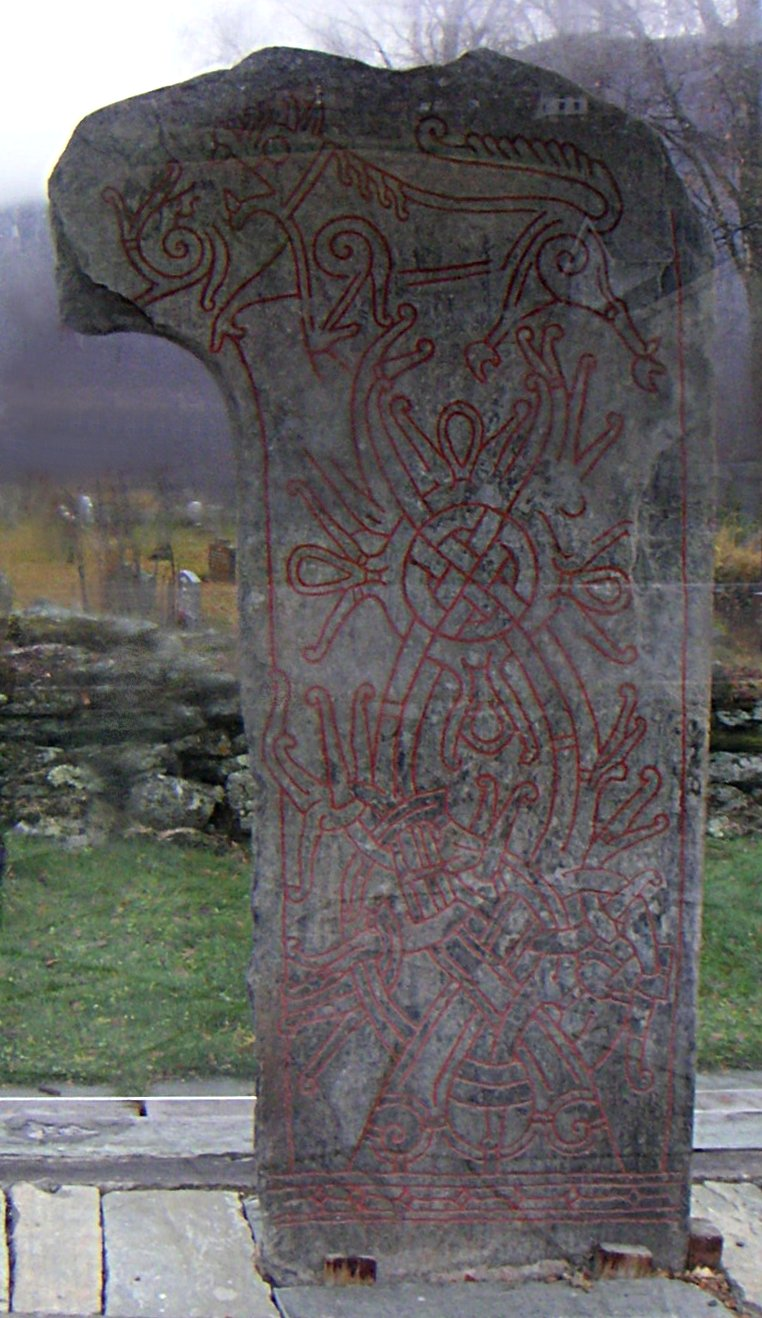
The Vang Stone, Oppland, Norway

Viking Age art is a term for the art of Scandinavia and Viking settlements elsewhere, especially in the British Isles, during the Viking Age. The Vikings were active in the Nordic countries between the late Early Middle Ages and the early portion of the High Middle Ages. There are three main artistic styles from that period: Jelling style, Ringerike style, and Urnes style. Jelling is named after a Danish royal grave in Jutland and usually involves heavy animal designs. The Ringerike style includes foliage ornaments and interlacing. The style is named after the district in Norway where examples of Ringerike exist in local sandstone. The Ringerike style can also be seen in English manuscripts, and there are also some carvings in ivory which are done in this style. The Urnes style is named after the detailed designs on the carved doors of Urnes Stave Church in the Sognefjord. The style has influenced English Christian art.

The main symbol of the Viking Age is the Viking ship. Not only was it used as a war and trade vessel, it demonstrated true individual design and art. An example of this comes from a ship burial in Norway, near the sea at Oseberg. Over 70 feet long, it held the remains of two women and many precious objects that were probably removed by robbers early before discovery. The head is 5 inches high and dates back to 834. It is currently located at the Viking Ship Museum, Bygdøy. The head of the ship represents a roaring beast with surface ornamentation in the form of interwoven animals that twist and turn as they are gripping and snapping.

During the 11th century many Scandinavians became Christian. However, their abstract art persisted. The decoration of the wooden portal of the stave church located in Urnes, Norway is abstractly made up of animal forms that tightly intertwine with flexible plant stalks following a spiral rhythm. This is one of the few remains left from this time which were later incorporated in the walls of a 12th-century church.

During this time while the abstract and animal motifs were spreading in art, the northern Europe Christian missionaries were building monasteries and sponsoring art with Christian content which was very different from art created before.

=== Post Renaissance ===
==== Danish ====
Danish art goes back thousands of years with significant artifacts from the 2nd millennium BC, such as the Trundholm sun chariot. Art from modern Denmark forms part of the art of the Nordic Bronze Age, and then Norse and Viking art. Danish medieval painting is almost entirely known from church frescoes such as those from the 16th-century artist known as the Elmelunde Master.

==== Finnish ====
Finland artists have made major contributions to handicrafts and Industrial design. Famous Finnish artists and sculptors include Wäinö Aaltonen, Eliel Saarinen, Eero Saarinen and Alvar Aalto.

==== Icelandic ====
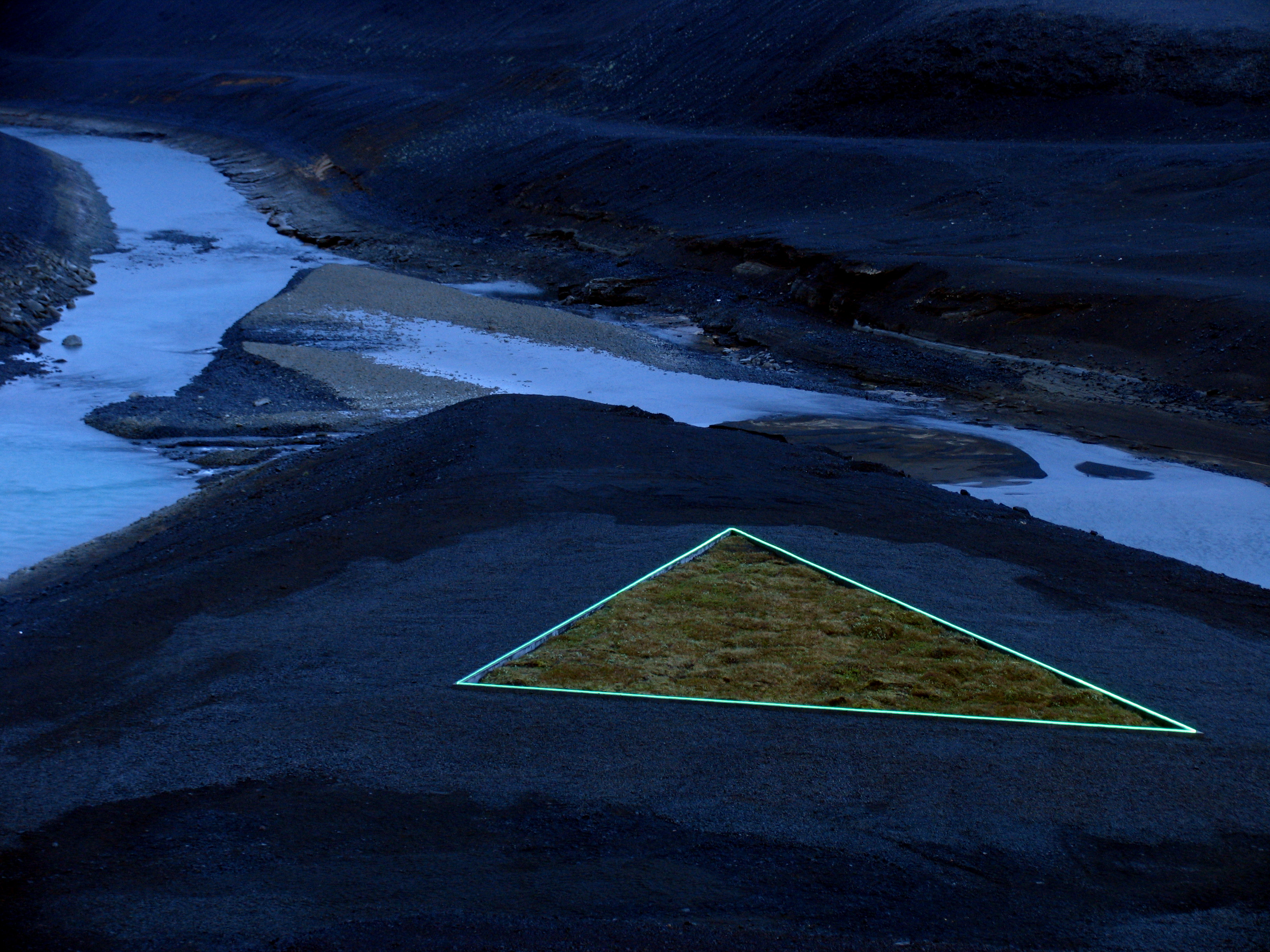
The artwork Mother Earth at the Vatnsfell Hydropower plant in Iceland (2005)

Icelandic art has been built on northern European traditions of the nineteenth century, but developed in distinct directions in the twentieth century, influenced in particular by the unique Icelandic landscape as well as by Icelandic mythology and culture.

==== Norwegian ====
Norwegian art came into its own in the 19th century, especially with the early landscape painters. Until that time, the art scene in Norway had been dominated by imports from Germany and Holland and by the influence of Danish rule. Initially with landscape art, later with Impressionism and Realism. One of Norway's most well-known artists is Edvard Munch (1863–1944).

==== Swedish ====
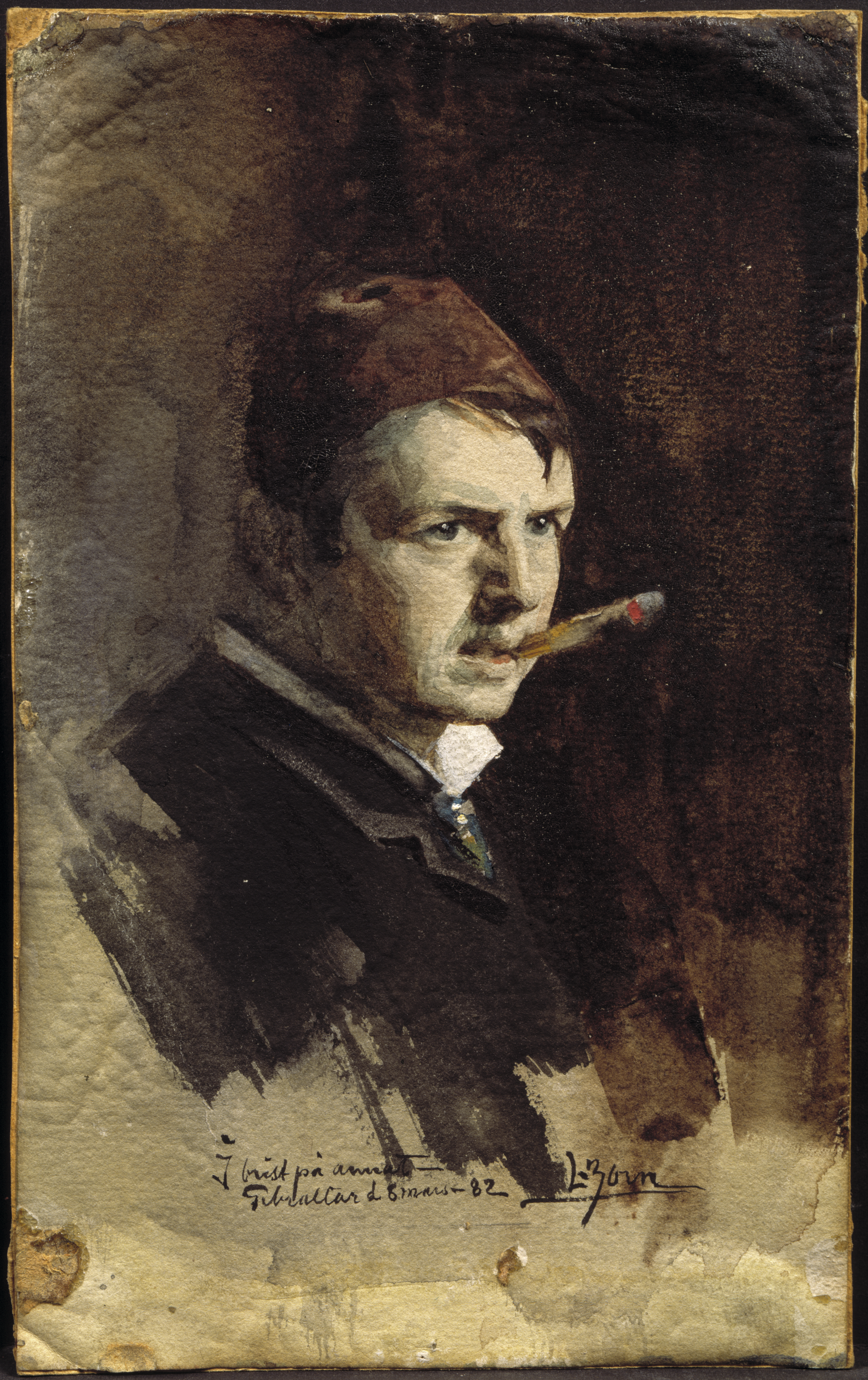
Anders Zorn, Self-portrait (1882)

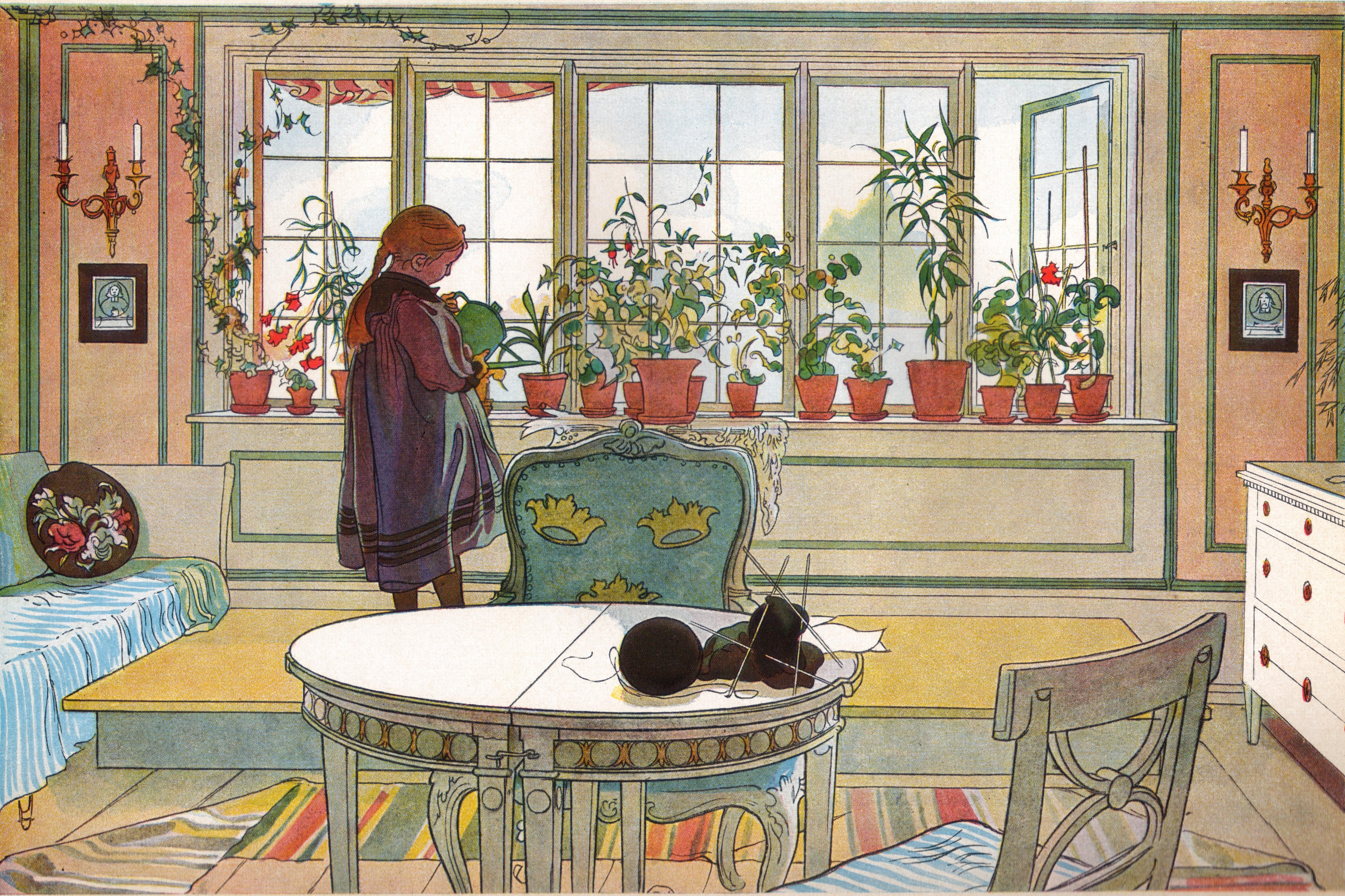
Carl Larsson, Flowers on the windowsill (1894)

Among famous Swedish artists are Johan Tobias Sergel (1740–1814), Carl Larsson (1853–1919), Anders Zorn (1860–1920), Carl Eldh (1873–1954) and Carl Milles (1875–1955).

== Art museums/galleries ==
=== Denmark ===
There are many art museums in Denmark, including:

- The National Museum in Copenhagen
- The National Gallery of Denmark
- Louisiana Museum of Modern Art
- Rosenborg Castle

=== Finland ===
There are quite a large number of art museums in Finland. The following art museums are found in the country's capital city, Helsinki.

- Finnish National Gallery

- Ateneum – an art museum
- Kiasma – a contemporary art museum

- DESIGNMUSEUM
- Helsinki City Art Museum
- Finnish Museum of Photography

=== Norway ===
Art museums in Norway include:

- National Museum of Art, Architecture and Design
- Lillehammer Art Museum
- Munch Museum
- Nordnorsk Kunstmuseum
- Drammen Museum of Art and Cultural History

== Art award ceremonies ==
In 1988, Carnegie Investment Bank established the Carnegie Art Award to be presented to artists born in, or living in, the Nordic countries. In 2012, the Norwegian monarchy established the Queen Sonja Nordic Art Award.

== See also ==
- List of Scandinavian textile artists
- Exhibition of Contemporary Scandinavian Art (1912–1913)
