= Danderyd (disambiguation) =

Danderyd is situated just north of Stockholm in Sweden

- Danderyd Municipality
- Danderyd parish
- Danderyd Ship District
- Danderyds sjukhus - hospital
- Danderyds SK - the ice hockey club
