= Karin Forseke =

Swedish businesswoman (born 1955)

Karin Birgitta Forseke CBE
- Born: 1955; Sweden
- Occupation: Businesswoman

Karin Forseke, CBE (born 1955, in Sweden) is a Swedish businesswoman and was CEO of the Swedish investment bank D. Carnegie & Co between 2003 and 2006. She became CEO in March 2003, when Lars Bertmar resigned his position as CEO to become Chairman of the company. She resigned in March 2006, being replaced by Stig Vilhelmson. Karin Forseke was one of the very few female CEOs in companies listed on the Stockholm Stock Exchange.

Carnegie was at that time a Nordic investment bank with offices in 8 countries listed on the Stockholm Stock Exchange. Prior to being appointed Chief Executive she was the Head of International Sales and Sales Trading at Carnegie from 1998.

In 1996–1998, Forseke was Chief Operating Officer of the London International Financial Futures Exchange, LIFFE. Other prior positions also include Private Advisor to the Minister of Financial Market and Local Government, Sweden, Westpac Banking Corporation's Financial Markets Group, London and Director of Business Development, The OMLX exchange, London.

She holds a number of private and public directorships. She is a non-executive director of the Financial Services Authority (FSA) Board, Eniro AB and the Royal Swedish Opera. In January 2012 she was appointed Non Executive Chairman of Alliance Trust. a In 2005, Forseke was ranked among the 100 most influential people in European capital markets according to Financial News.

Forseke was awarded the Félix Neubergh Lecture 2007, Gothenburg University; Leadership; challenges and opportunities in the business of privatization.
