= Carnegie Medal =

Carnegie Medal may refer to:

- Carnegie Medal for Writing, for children's literature in the UK
- Carnegie Medal for Illustration, for children's literature in the UK, formerly the Kate Greenaway Medal
- Andrew Carnegie Medals for Excellence in Fiction and Nonfiction, in the US
- Carnegie Medal for Excellence in Children's Video
- Carnegie Medal of Philanthropy
- Carnegie Prize, awarded by the Carnegie Museum of Art in Pittsburgh, Pennsylvania
- Carnegie Art Award, Swedish award
- The medal awarded by the Carnegie Hero Fund
