= Carnegie Building =

Carnegie Building may refer to:

- Carnegie Building (Atlanta)
- Carnegie Building (Troy, New York)
- Carnegie Building (Pittsburgh)

== See also ==
- Lists of Carnegie libraries
