= Elis Fischer =

Swedish politician

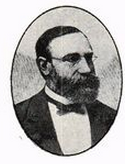

Member of the Swedish Parliament
- In office 24 March 1886 – 1886

Personal details
- Born: 13 January 1834 Askersund, Sweden
- Died: 19 August 1889 (aged 55) Långholmen, Sweden
- Party: Independent
- Spouse: Hildur Fredrika Abenius (m. 1864–1889)
- Relatives: Gunnar Fischer (grandson); Tomas Fischer (great-grandson)
- Education: Uppsala University

Gustaf Elis Fischer (13 January 1834 – 19 August 1889) was a Swedish business executive and lawyer, served as the chief executive of Skandia from 1870 to 1886, and was a Member of Parliament. He is remembered for the Fischer trial, during which he faced accusations of fraud and received a prison sentence.

== Early life ==
Gustaf Elis Fischer was born on 13 January 1834 in Askersund, Sweden. His father, Per Gustaf Fischer, was a postmaster, and his mother was Eva Sophia Fischer (née Brattström). Fischer had two younger full brothers, Emil Nicanor (1839–1912) and Alfred Theodor (1836–1839). His maternal grandfather was Magnus Brattström, an ironmaster. After his father's death in 1845, Fischer moved to Örebro with his mother and brother. He completed his education at an elementary school in Askersund and graduated from Karolinska elementarläroverket in Örebro in 1854. Following his graduation, Fischer enrolled at Uppsala University and successfully passed the court exams in 1859.

== Business career ==
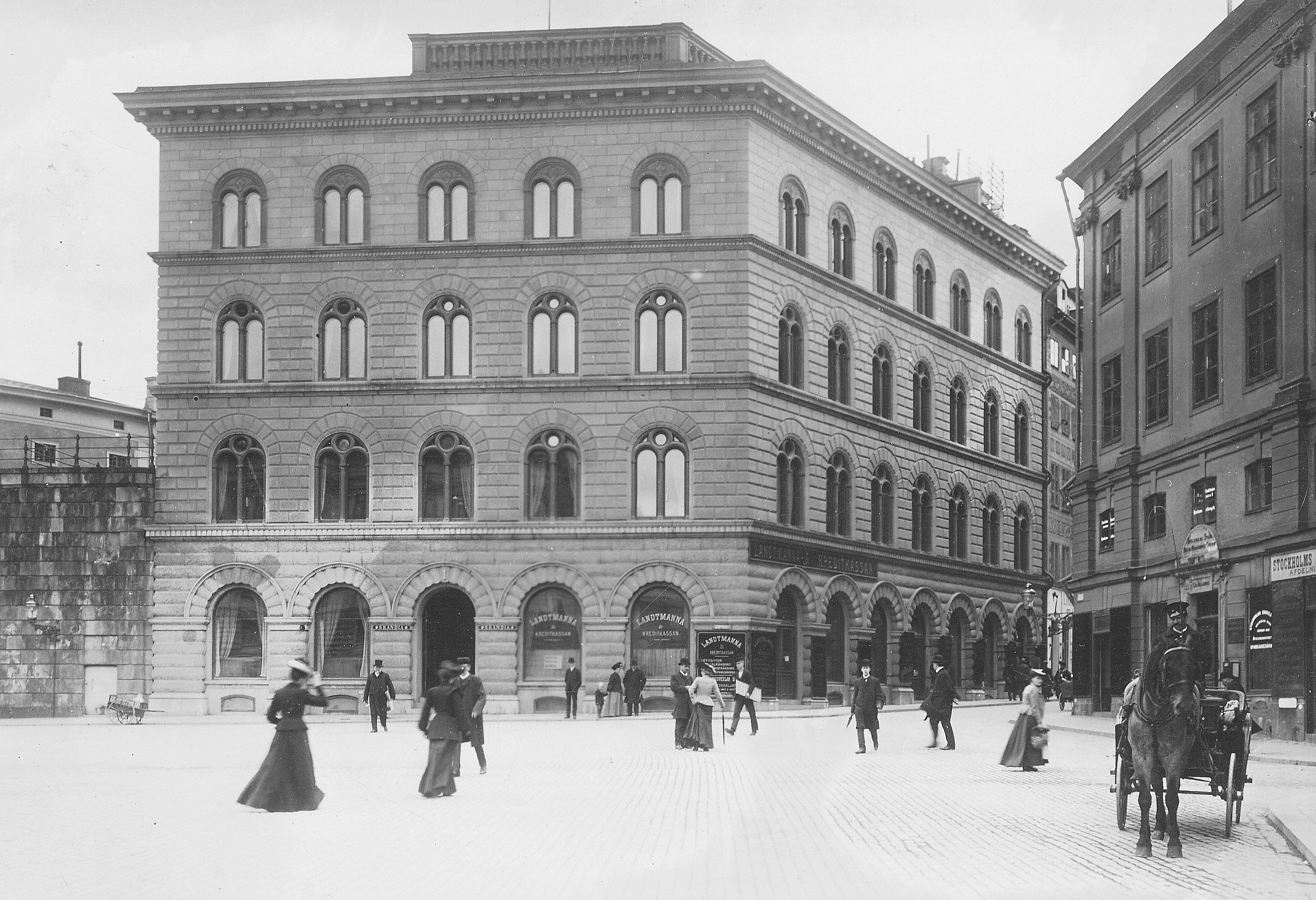
Skandia at Mynttorget, c. 1900

Fischer had already started working at Skandia in 1862, and assumed the role of chief executive manager at Skandia, succeeding Wilhelm Dufwa in June 1870. However, in 1886, he was replaced by Gustaf Lagerbring amid allegations of fraud. These accusations stemmed from Fischer's difficulty in maintaining a clear separation between his personal and his workplace finances. He was known for being a loyal follower of Wallenberg and acted as a trustee for André Oscar Wallenberg.

Fischer also played a role in establishing the Skandia building at Mynttorget.

== Political career ==
In March 1886, Fischer was appointed as a member of Första kammaren for a period of nine years, following his election by the City of Stockholm's municipal council on 22 March that year. He served in this role until December 1886 when he faced accusations of fraud. In response to these allegations, he resigned from his political positions, including relinquishing his mandate, on 17 December 1886.

== Other efforts ==
Fischer held membership in the Insurance Organization, the Fire Insurance Tariff Organization, and also was a member of the Widow conservation.

== Family ==
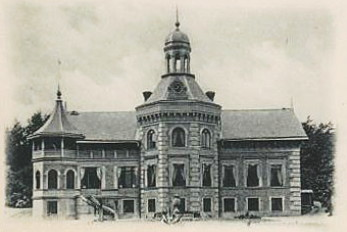
Edsby Castle

In 1864, Fischer married Hildur Fredrika Abenius (1843–1926), whose father was Carl Fredrik Abenius. They had children and lived at Edsby Castle, north of Stockholm. Fischer had it built as a castle-like building.

On 19 August 1889 Fischer died at Långholmen Prison in Stockholm.

== Appointments ==
- Knight of the Order of the Polar Star.
- Knight of the Order of Vasa.

== Sources ==
- Elgenstierna, Gustaf (1907). Köping stads tjänstemän, 1605-1905: personhistoriska anteckningar (in Swedish). P.A. Norstedt.
- Fries, Elias Magnus; Sydow, Carl-Otto von (1994). Brev 1875-1876 till sonen Thore (in Swedish). Uppsala University Library. ISBN 978-91-85092-36-9.
- Hildebrand, Albin. XXV:1. Riksdagens första kammare 1867–1904 (in Swedish). Stockholm: HASSE W. TULLBERGS FÖRLAG.
- Lilienberg, G. R. (1886). "1886. Första Kammaren. N:o 20" (in Swedish). Riksdag. pp. 7–8.
- Lindahl, Carl Fredrik (1900). Svenska millionärer. Minnen och anteckningar. Vol. 5. Stockholm: KÖRRSNERS BOKTRYCKERI-AKTIEBOLAG.
- Malmström, Joakim (2006). Herrskapen och den lokala politiken: Eds socken ca 1650-1900 (in Swedish). Uppsala Universitet. ISBN 978-91-554-6511-7.
- Nilsson, Göran B. (2005). The Founder: André Oscar Wallenberg (1816-1886), Swedish Banker, Politician & Journalist. Almqvist & Wiksell International. ISBN 978-91-22-02102-5.
- Ringbom, Sixten (1987). Stone, Style and Truth: The Vogue for Natural Stone in Nordic Architecture 1880-1910. éditeur non identifié. ISBN 978-951-9056-82-1.
- Rossander, Olle (2007). Det kidnappade kapitalet: på spaning i Skandiaaffärens skugga (in Swedish). Leopard Förlag. ISBN 978-91-7343-209-2.
