= Tomas Fischer =

Swedish businessman (1940–2022)

- Born: Tomas Jörgen Fischer; 1 December 1940; Härnösand, Sweden
- Died: 15 August 2022 (aged 81); Saint Barthélemy, France
- Occupations: Book publisher, businessman
- Relatives: Gunnar Fischer (uncle); Elis Fischer (great-grandfather)

Tomas Jörgen Fischer (1 December 1940 – 15 August 2022) was a Swedish book publisher and businessman.

He was born in Härnösand, and later grew up in Sundsvall. He began to work with financier Erik Penser. With Penser, they both had worked as stockbrokers at the Carnegie Investment Bank. In 1983, Fischer established his own business which was called Fischer & Partners, which in 2001 was sold to the village Invik.

Fischer had taken the enterprise for the investment company Skanditek. He had bought the book publishing company Author's Publishing House, which he had given the new name Fischer & Co. Publishing House. It was later sold to Lind & Co. Fischer had worked with Sven Philip-Sörensen, in which they've both been involved at the Confidencen. In the 1980s, he was suspected of being involved in an investigation of the assassination of politician and statesman Olof Palme. It had happened with his appearing to fund Ebbe Carlsson's investigation about the assassination.

Fischer resided in Saint Barthélemy in 1994. He served as an honorary member of the student society Norrlands nation and also the Stockholms nation. Fischer was honored with the medal Ordre national du Mérite. In 2010, he was implicated in a debate of the government agency Swedish Tax Agency, which was about his residing place. The government agency had asserted that Fischer lived in Sweden. He was imposed with over 100 million SEK, in which there was a case that was taken to the supreme court.

Fischer died in August 2022, having drowned next to his home in Saint Barthélemy, at the age of 81.
