= Zetterberg =

Zetterberg is a surname. Notable people with the surname include:

- Christer Zetterberg (1941–2012), Swedish businessman
- Erik Zetterberg (born 1997), Swedish footballer
- Hanna Zetterberg (born 1973), Swedish politician
- Henrik Zetterberg (born 1980), Swedish ice hockey player
- Herman Zetterberg (1904–1963), Swedish jurist and politician
- Margaretha Zetterberg (1733–1803), Swedish woman
- Pär Zetterberg (born 1970), Swedish footballer
- Stephen Zetterberg (1916–2009), American attorney
- Torbjörn Zetterberg (born 1976), Swedish jazz musician and composer
