= Nannette Stafford =

African-American physician (1853–1933)

Nannie Stafford
- Born: Nannette Stafford; June 20, 1853; Cumberland Island, GA
- Died: May 2, 1933 (aged 79); London, England
- Resting place: Possibly London
- Citizenship: American, Swiss and German
- Education: Doctor of Medicine; Howard University, 1878
- Alma mater: University of Zurich
- Occupation: Physician
- Spouse: Gustav Arnold Gassman (m. 1877–1889)
- Children: Georg Arnold Gassmann

Nannette Stafford (June 20, 1853 – May 2, 1933) was a doctor of medicine who was born into slavery and was one of the first women to graduate from Howard University with a degree in medicine. She continued her medical work in Europe, and in 1907, she founded and managed her own medical facility.

== Early life ==
Nannette (or as she later became known, Nancy or Nannie) Stafford was born a slave on Cumberland Island, GA on June 20, 1853. Her father, Robert Stafford, was a slaveowner, while her mother, "Juda" was one of his slaves on his plantation. She had one older sister born in 1850 named Cornelia, both girls were recorded on Robert Stafford's 1860 tax inventory list as slaves. Records indicate that Juda was Stafford's plantation nurse, who had taught herself homeopathic medicine using the plants in the surrounding area.

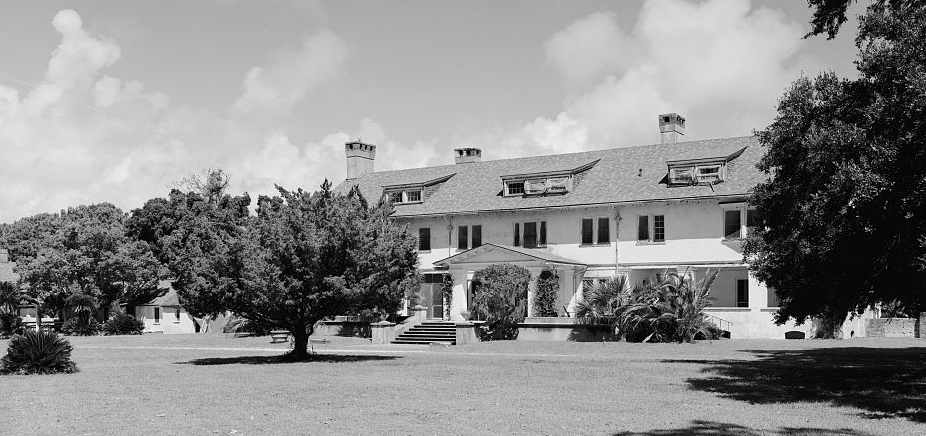
The Stafford Plantation on Cumberland Island, GA in 1916

During the Civil War, Nannette and her sister were smuggled out of Georgia as the Confederate army increased in strength. In September 1863 the two children were snuck aboard a ship of missionaries traveling to Fernandina, Florida, a city recently taken by the Union. Once there, the two girls attended classes at a makeshift school that was established by the Army for the women and children who were family members of Florida's freedmen's militia. The Army at Fernandina was overwhelmed and didn't have the proper resources to coordinate education opportunities for the children. This resulted in them asking missionaries to assist with multiple social enterprises in order to increase the standard of living. The schools that were created by the missionaries included integrated classrooms.

In 1864 the sisters traveled to New York City, unlike their voyage to Fernandina, this time Robert accompanied them. They then traveled to New Jersey, where Robert signed over custody of both Nannette and Cornelia to George and Eliza Webb. The Webb family were wealthy merchants as well as avid abolitionists who lived in Elizabeth, New Jersey. They adopted the sisters and took over their housing and educational needs. At the time, the couple lived with their adult daughter, Sarah Webb. In 1870 while living with the Webb's, Nannette was registered on the US Census for the first time at 17 years old. At that time Cornelia was listed as 19, George Webb as 70, Eliza as 74, and Sarah as 45 years old. The census noted that neither Nannette nor Cornelia had attended school within the past year. It is believed that Nannette began her medical training under the tutelage of Sarah after Eliza died in 1872. In the years that followed, Nannette sometimes took the Webb last name in various forms on official records.

== Education ==
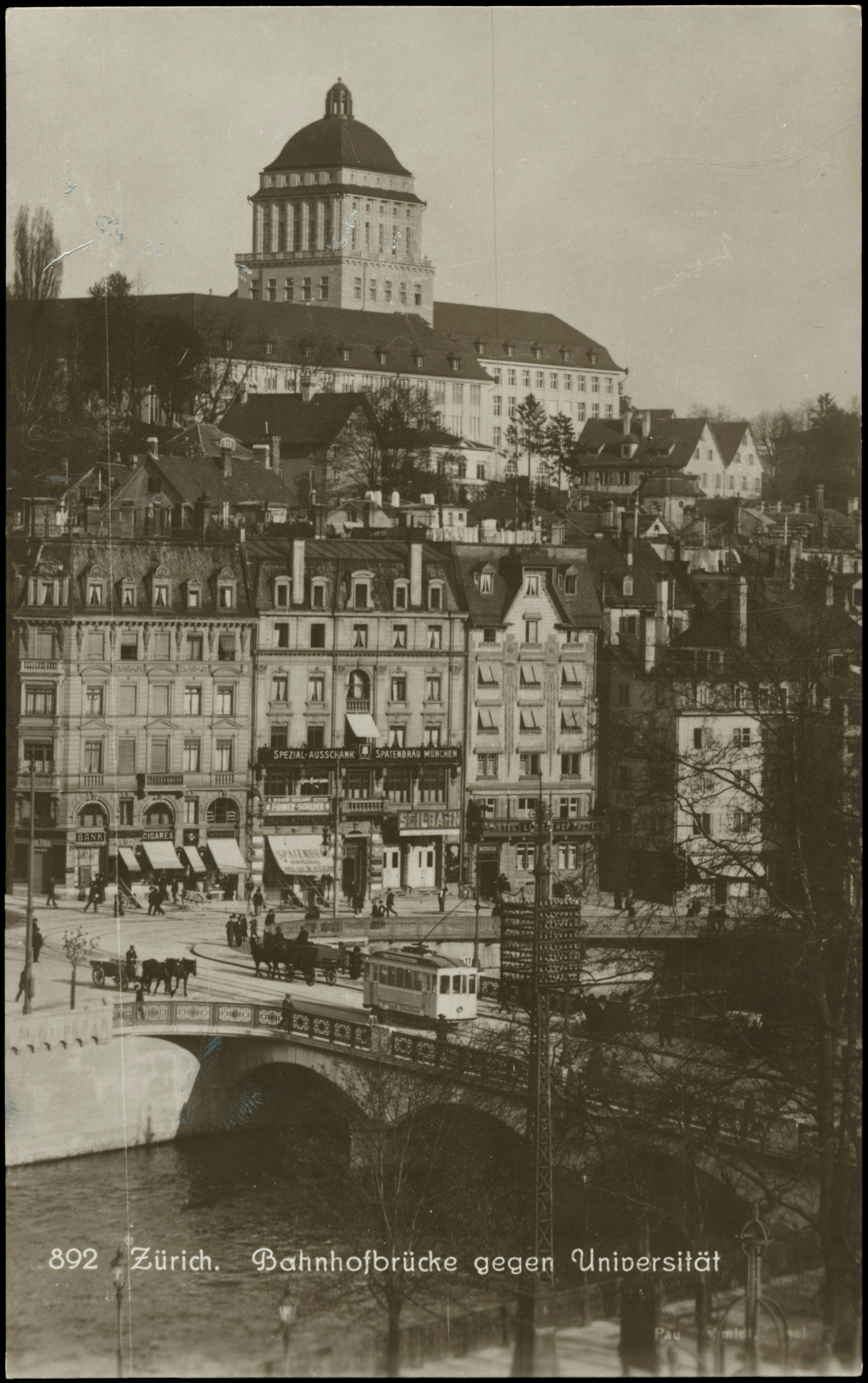
Stafford attended the University of Zurich in Switzerland from 1879 to 1887.

During this period of time, women were not welcome in the medical field in almost any capacity. Before the Civil War, the only women who assisted with health care were older and untrained, often handpicked by the physician. However, due to the increasing need of nurses during the war, the number of women working increased dramatically. This sudden change led to male physicians being extremely abrasive to women in medicine, making education and training for them extremely difficult.

Howard University was one of the first Universities to accept Black and African American students into their medical program. They also had a gender-blind policy, allowing men and women to be educated in the same classrooms and female professors to teach. Stafford attended Howard from 1876 to 1878, and graduated early in two years instead of the typical three years of training that is required. This is because Stafford was able to transfer credits she had earned while attending classes at the Institute for Colored Youth in Philadelphia. In 1878 she became one of the first Black women to earn the equivalent of a doctorate in medicine from Howard University.

Immediately after graduation Stafford went on to live and practice medicine in Osnabrück, Germany. This was short lived however, as she soon left Germany and moved to Switzerland. In 1879, she enrolled in University of Zurich for further education until May 5, 1883. There was a large influx of North American medical students to universities in German-speaking countries throughout the last 3 decades of the 1800s. Education and training received by students during this period was not restrained by gender as it was in the US, and there were a higher quality of medical facilities. From late 1884 until 1887 Stafford studied at the medical department, later becoming an assistant to multiple members of faculty. Despite her studies and progress, she was still listed in University records as a student rather than a research assistant.

While working at the university, she assisted in research concerning typhoid fever, eventually falling ill to the disease herself in 1887. As a result, Stafford would be paralyzed for many years afterwards.

== Career ==
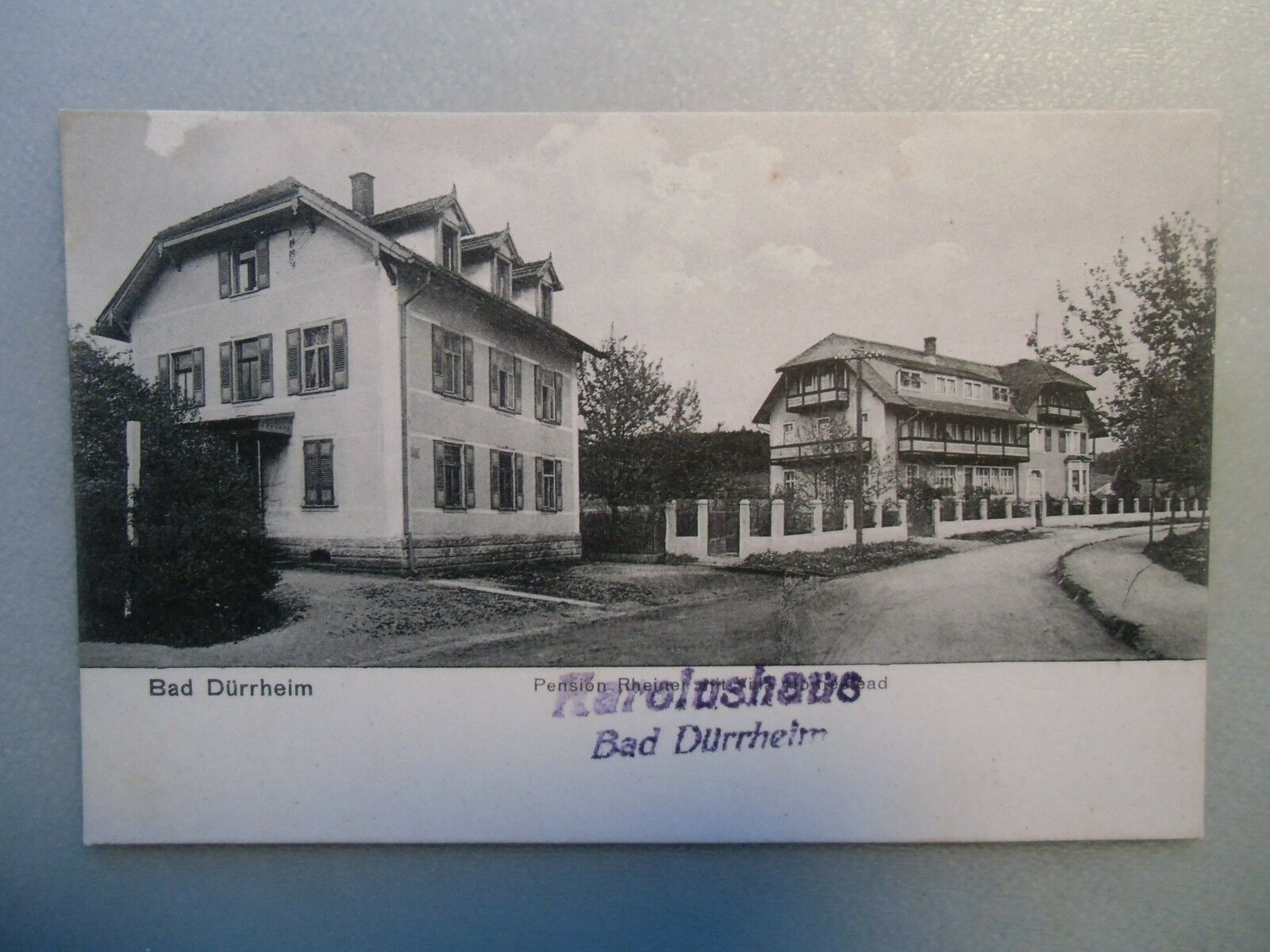
Karoluhaus medical facility in Duerrheim Germany, founded and managed by Stafford.

In 1906 Stafford moved back to Germany from Zurich at 52 years old. In 1907, she opened her own medical practice in Bad Dürrheim, a small town in Germany. She established lodgings for patients that, unlike other medical practices at the time, would accommodate sick children and their mothers. In 1908 she purchased Villa Rheiner and undertook the role of managing the entire healthcare facility. Her vision was to provide more homeopathic remedies to sick individuals using Dürrheim's natural hot springs. The property had 3 acres of land and a 2-story house to be used as a kur-pension. Stafford was a large proponent for hydrotherapy in medical capacities, however due to cost, most of the population of Dürrheim were unable to receive any benefit as they couldn't afford such types of treatment. Germany had expanded health care to ensure universal coverage only a couple of decades previously, but those who were on the lower socio-economic scale still could only afford most necessary treatments.

In the early 20th century many in the medical field considered Stafford's treatments as "vacation therapy" and ineffectual, however Dr. Stafford was determined to treat her patients as guests and advocated for hydrotherapy in extended capacities. Today, physicians utilize these treatments in multiple ways as an alternative therapy to help patients who suffer from chronic conditions. Dr. Stafford's medical facility eventually became a private sanitarium, Karolushaus, and continued operations until 2005 when it eventually closed due to the economic downturn.

== Personal life ==
One of the most detailed physical description of Stafford is from her graduation at Howard University, written by The Washington Post:

Dr. NANNIE W. STAFFORD, of Elizabeth, is a deep brunette about 22 years old, tall and imposing in presence, weighing probably 160 pounds, large black eyes and very handsome features. She was dressed in a rich black silk, cut high neck and en traine. Her luxuriant black hair was twisted up and worn in artistic style at the back of the head and ornamented with a pink bon soline rosebud, festooned with a spray of smilax. Button gaiters, No. 2 in size, enclosed her feet, and diamond earrings hung pendant from her ears. Her other ornaments were a handsome gold watch chain and bracelets, and cameo gold encircled finger rings. A rich lace collar, four inches deep, surrounded her neck. Upon receiving her diploma, she was presented with thirteen or fourteen bouquets.

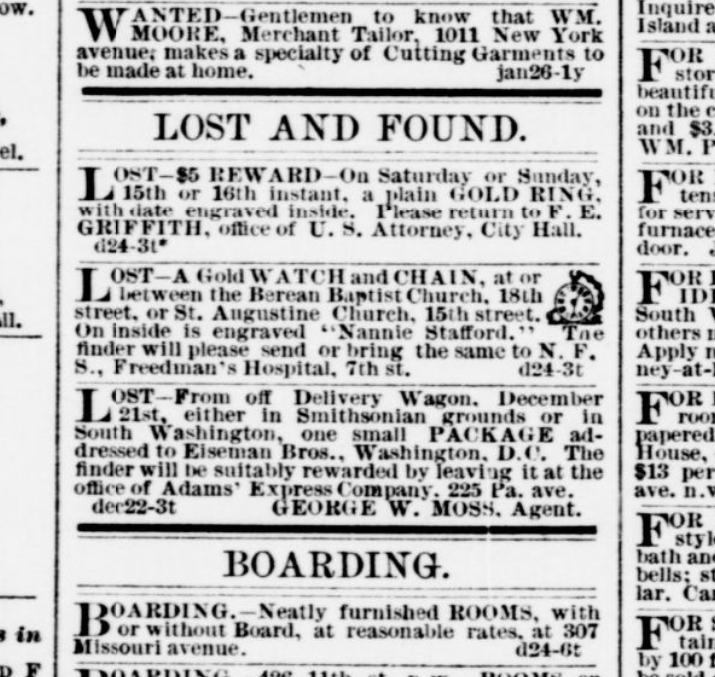
Lost and Found posting by Nannie Stafford in the Evening Star on December 24th, 1877

Stafford married Gustav Arnold Gassmann, a Swiss native, in 1887. Together they had a son, Georg Arnold Gassmann, on October 28, 1888. He was born in Zurich and even though Stafford used the German spelling, it is thought that the name "Georg" is in memory of George Webber who died in 1883. Georg later became a physician who worked in London, England. Stafford's marriage became troubled, as Gustav was often drunk and made racist comments to Stafford. He went to a Swiss tribunal arguing that he deserved direct access to Stafford's income, saying it was his right as her husband. This led to a 1889 trial, during which a judge put a hold on her bank account. Eventually it became clear that Gustav had only married Stafford for her money as during the divorce proceedings it came to light that she had never received a dowry (a common practice in Switzerland at the time) and was often abused by her husband, including at least once physically. Stafford was granted her divorce and the right to control of her money in late 1889.

It appears that Stafford came back to Washington, D.C., in late December 1877, perhaps to visit old colleagues and friends from Howard University, who were the only people she is believed to have known in the area. However, during that time she lost a "gold watch and chain" which had "Nannie Stafford" engraved within. She advertised her lost watch multiple times in the Evening Star, mentioning that she lost it at or between Berean Baptist Church and St. Augustine. She asks whoever finds it to return it to "N.S.F. Freedman's Hospital" which today is Howard University Hospital.

During the later part of the Civil War, the Stafford Plantation was used as a garrison for Union soldiers; this resulted in much of the building being burned down. The property was purchased by the Carnegie family in 1889 as a winter home. In 1901 the "Stafford House" was rebuilt on the remaining ruins called "The Chimneys".

In the 1920s, Stafford retired from managing her health care center in Germany and began to travel to England more frequently to visit her son Georg. She died in 1933 at her home in England at 80 years old. Her gravesite is unknown, but is thought to be somewhere in London.
