= Christer Zetterberg =

Swedish businessman (1941–2012)

Christer Zetterberg (2 November 1941 – 5 April 2012) was a Swedish businessman and Chairman of investment bank Carnegie.

Zetterberg graduated with a degree in business. After starting his career in the Swedish paper industry, he became CEO of the state-owned PK-Banken (now a part of Nordea) in 1988. As such he took part in buying Carnegie from Erik Penser. In 1990 he moved to one of the most prestigious jobs in Swedish industry at that time – CEO of Volvo. He stayed in that position for two years, serving under Chairman Pehr G. Gyllenhammar. After leaving Volvo in 1992, Zetterberg served on a number of different boards.

Zetterberg was chairman at Carnegie between 2001 and 2002, before stepping down to vice chairman behind former CEO Lars Bertmar. When Bertmar resigned in 2006, Zetterberg became chairman again. He also sat on the board of Fredrik Lundberg's investment company and a number of other Swedish companies. Zetterberg was also a member of the Royal Swedish Academy of Engineering Sciences since 1988.
