= Kristina Jansson =

Swedish painter

- Born: July 7, 1967 (age 59)
- Education: Stockholm Royal Institute of Art
- Known for: Painting

Kristina Jansson is a contemporary visual artist and painter from Sweden.

Kristina Jansson was born 1967. She lives and work in Stockholm.

Between 1994 and 1995 Jansson studied at the Vienna fine arts academy and between 1995 and 2001 she studied at the Stockholm royal institute of art.

Jansson's paintings experiments with the relationship between the surface of the paintings and their subjects. The paintings are influenced by popular culture.

In 2010 Jansson got second prize in the Carnegie Art Award. She is also part of the Swedish art academy.
