= Torsten Andersson =

Swedish modernist painter (1926–2009)

- Born: Otto Torsten Andersson; 6 June 1926; Östra Sallerup, Hörby Municipality, Sweden
- Died: 30 May 2009 (aged 82); Benarp, Hörby, Sweden
- Education: Otte Sköld's Drawing School, Stockholm (1945); Royal Swedish Academy of Arts (1946–1950); Royal Danish Academy of Fine Arts, Copenhagen (1947)
- Known for: Painting, Drawing
- Notable work: The Spring II (1962); The Clouds Between Us (1966); Triptych of Poetry (1983–86); My Headstone (2005)
- Awards: Prince Eugen Medal (1995); Rolf Schock Prizes in Visual Arts (1997); Carnegie Art Award (1998, 2008)

Otto Torsten Andersson (6 June 1926 – 30 May 2009) was a Swedish modernist painter, best known for his theme of the realistic depiction of abstract sculptures, and two-dimensional exploration of three-dimensional objects, where the colors seem to be superimposed on a random and perfunctory manner.

Torsten Andersson was born in Östra Sallerup parish (now part of Hörby Municipality), in Skåne in 1926. After practicing painting at Otte Sköld's Drawing School in Stockholm in 1945, Andersson attended classes at the Royal Swedish Academy of Arts in 1946–1950. In 1947, he studied art at the Royal Danish Academy of Fine Arts in Copenhagen.

From early on, Andersson returned constantly to the question of whether or not painting can be seen as a language. He felt out of place in the Swedish art scene of the 1940s, when he was an emerging artist; it seemed to him that everyone had borrowed or inherited their artistic style. His own eccentric cross between melancholy nature painting and constructivism in the 1950s met very little critical understanding. Yet Andersson soon earned a reputation as an "artists' artist", or rather a "painters' painter-an artist" who went his own way, off the beaten track of modernism.

In 1960, Anderson was made a professor of arts in Stockholm. After a personal conflict with the Academy, where he suddenly found himself "totally isolated, and completely abandoned", he suddenly resigned in 1966 as professor and retired to his native Skåne, where he remained for the rest of his life. For seven years, his artistic career was put on hold. As he would later describe an art historical course of events; the year 1966 inspired a series of somber headstone paintings, notable Min Headstone (Min gravsten) from 2005. Andersson later elaborated about his dissent:

"The best art acts within an art historical course of events. My own merit as an artist is that I attempted to intervene in such a course. In 1966 the dissension within me, the split that is clearly discernible in The Spring II (Källan II) (1962), led me to draw a crucial conclusion. That split had separated painting into two incompatible parts. In 1966 I allowed one of these, the fictitious part, to represent the other, the concrete part, and so the divide in painting was healed in a way that involved the steadfast re-establishment of easel painting as an art form at the very time when this art form had begun to crack. Today some forty years later that conclusion seems radical and legitimate".

Andersson remained an artist who studied and practiced experimental painting, conquering and creating his own language in the process. He usually destroyed hundreds of the sketches that led to his finished works. Lars Nittve, head of the Moderna Museet art museum in Stockholm, said about Andersson's working process:

"Of one hundred working drawings, ninety are destroyed. The surviving ten drawings give new impetus to a hundred, of which ninety are destroyed. Twenty drawings remain. Of those, sixteen are destroyed. Four remain. They go further in the working process, with no guarantee of survival".

Nor was Andersson quite satisfied with his own work; in 2008, when he received the Carnegie Art Award first prize of SEK 1,000,000, he said: "I've worked hard my whole damned life, sacrificing myself and so much else for the art. This prize is no confirmation that I have succeeded, but perhaps a little hint about it". Torsten Andersson died aged 82 in Hörby in 2009.

== Selected bibliography ==
- Lars O Ericsson, Galleriet, article in the Dagens Nyheter, January 31, 1999.
- Lars Nittve, Som ett norrsken, Torsten Andersson, Sveriges Allmänna Konstförening : Årsbok 2002.
- Magnus Bons, En målning är inte en bild – om några verk av Torsten Andersson, Konstvetenskapliga institutionen, Stockholm University, Stockholm.
