= Edsby Castle =

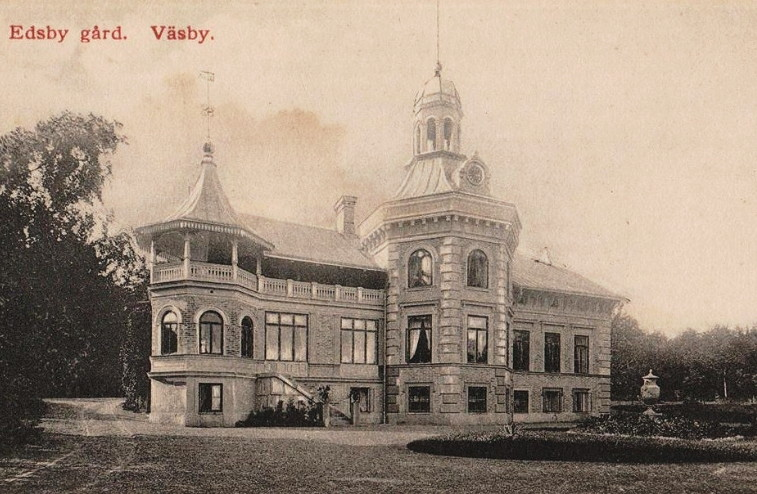
- Interactive map of the Edsby Castle area

General information
- Location: Sweden
- Completed: 1872
- Client: Vardaga

Edsby Castle (Swedish: Edsby slott) is a manor house located in Stockholm, Sweden. It was completed in 1872.

Since 1968, the manor has served as a retirement home, but before then, it was the Teleborg girls' school.

Vardaga acquired the building in 2015.

The manor was built for chief executive of Skandia Elis Fischer who was accused of fraud.
