= David Carnegie (entrepreneur) =

Scottish entrepreneur

David Carnegie Sr. (8 February 1772 – 10 January 1837) was a Scottish entrepreneur who founded D. Carnegie & Co. in Gothenburg, Sweden, today known as Carnegie Investment Bank.

== See also ==
- Balquhidder
- Carnegie (disambiguation)
