= Lars Bertmar =

Swedish businessman (born 1945)

Chairman of Carnegie
- In office 2003–2006
- Succeeded by: Christer Zetterberg

CEO of Carnegie
- In office 1990–2003
- Succeeded by: Karin Forseke

Personal details
- Born: 1945 (age 80–81)
- Education: Stockholm School of Economics (PhD, 1977)
- Occupation: Businessman, academic

Lars Bertmar (born 1945) is a Swedish businessman who was CEO and Chairman of investment bank Carnegie. He holds a PhD and is a lecturer at Stockholm School of Economics.

He graduated from the Stockholm School of Economics in 1977. After working for different companies, including being vice president at Handelsbanken, Bertmar became CEO of Carnegie in 1990. After 13 years as CEO, he stepped down, being replaced by Karin Forseke, and was instead elected Chairman of the company. He resigned in 2006 and was replaced by Christer Zetterberg.

He is also a member of the Royal Swedish Academy of Engineering Sciences.
