= Carnegie (surname) =

Carnegie is a Scottish surname. Notable people with the name include:

- Andrew Carnegie (1835–1919), Scottish-American industrialist and philanthropist
- Dale Carnegie (1888–1955), American writer and lecturer
- David Carnegie (entrepreneur) (1772–1837), Scottish-Swedish industrialist
- David Carnegie (explorer) (1871–1900), British explorer in Western Australia
- David Carnegie (RAF officer) (1897–1964), Royal Air Force commander during World War II
- Dean Carnegie (born 1945), American magician
- Herb Carnegie (1919–2012), Jamaican-Canadian hockey player and philanthropist
- James Carnegie, 3rd Duke of Fife (1929–2015), British landowner and farmer
- Mary Elizabeth Carnegie (1916–2008), American nurse and educator
- Mike Carnegie (born 1984), Canadian lacrosse player
- Sir Robin Carnegie (1926–2011), British Army general
- Roderick Carnegie (1932–2024), Australian businessman
- Scott Carnegie (born 1985), Canadian lacrosse player
- Earls of Northesk, surname Carnegie, 1662 to present
- Earls of Southesk, surname Carnegie, 1575 to present
