= Carnegie station =

Carnegie station may refer to:

- Carnegie Station, Western Australia, Australia; a pastoral lease
- Carnegie railway station, Melbourne, Victoria, Australia
- Carnegie station (Pittsburgh Regional Transit), Carnegie, Pennsylvania, USA

== See also ==
- Carnegie (disambiguation)
