= Troels Wörsel =

Danish painter

Troels Wörsel (November 10, 1950 - December 12, 2018) was a Danish painter active in Cologne and Pietrasanta.

== Biography ==
Troels Wörsel was born in Aarhus, Denmark. He was self taught. In the 1970s, he moved to Cologne and became interested in pop and conceptual art. His art usually addressed philosophical issues, such as the relationship between space and time. In 1981, he contributed to the pioneer exhibition Rundschau Deutschland in Munich and Cologne and at the Bildwechsel at Akademie der Künste in Berlin. He represented Denmark at the fifty-second Venice Biennale in 2007.

In 1995 Wörsel was awarded the Eckersberg Medal, and in 2002 he won Carnegie Art Award first prize, and in 2004, he received the Thorvaldsen Medal. He died in 2018 at Cologne, Germany. His work is displayed at the Museum of Modern Art in New York City and the Centre Pompidou in Paris.
