= Anders Ahrengren =

Swedish brothel owner and gambler

- Born: 1 September 1771; Örebro, Sweden
- Died: 8 November 1841 (aged 70); Stockholm, Sweden
- Occupations: Brothel owner, gambler

Anders Andersson Ahrengren (1 September 1771 – 8 November 1841) was a Swedish gambler, brothel owner, and infamous figure in Stockholm’s entertainment scene.

== Early life ==
Ahrengren was born 1 September 1771 in Örebro, Närke, Sweden, to shoemaker Anders Ahrengren and Brita Stina Almgren.

== Career ==
Ahrengren came to Stockholm at the age of 20, when he was employed as a clerk by a lottery collector. In 1792, he witnessed the assassination of Gustav III at the Royal Opera House. Through this, he became acquainted with the Italian who owned the gaming house on Stora Nygatan. Ahrengren later took over the gambling house, which he moved to Storkyrkobrinken. After some time, fortune turned against him, and during the parliamentary sessions of the 1820s he lost considerable sums through gambling, which in 1830 forced him to sell his house on Norra Smedjegatan.

At an auction following the death of Sparrman, Ahrengren acquired the skull of René Descartes. Some years later, Berzelius persuaded him of the importance of returning the skull to France and bought it back from Ahrengren for the same sum he had originally paid.

== Family and death ==
Ahrengren's daughter Haralda Eleonora Andersson (1819–1901) married chief district judge Carl Fredrik Abenius.

Ahrengren died on 8 November 1841, and according to legend, his ghost is said to haunt the cemetery at the St. John's Church.
