= Carnegie Foundation =

Carnegie Foundation may refer to:

- Andrew Carnegie Foundation, a foundation in the U.S. formerly known as the Carnegie Corporation of New York
- Carnegie Foundation (Netherlands), the managing organization of the Peace Palace in the Netherlands
- Carnegie Foundation for the Advancement of Teaching, a policy and research center in the U.S.
- Carnegie Foundation African Diaspora Fellowship, a program of the Institute of International Education funded by the Carnegie Foundation

== See also ==
- Carnegie Endowment for International Peace, an international affairs think tank based in Washington, D.C., with offices in the Middle East, Europe, East Asia, and South Asia.
- Carnegie (disambiguation)
