= Carl Fredrik Abenius =

Swedish chief district judge

Chief district judge of the Danderyd Ship District
- In office 1861–1867

Personal details
- Born: 14 April 1815 Högfors, Ljusnarsberg Municipality, Örebro County, Sweden
- Died: 23 February 1895 (aged 79) Södertälje, Stockholm County, Sweden
- Spouse: Haralda Eleonora Andersson
- Relatives: Anders Ahrengren (father-in-law); Märta Söderberg (grand-niece)
- Education: Uppsala University

Carl Fredrik Abenius (14 April 1815 – 23 February 1895) was a Swedish lawyer. He served as the chief district judge of the Danderyd Ship District from 1861 to 1867.

== Early life ==
Carl Fredrik Abenius was born on 14 April 1815 in Högfors, Ljusnarsberg Municipality, Sweden. His father, Johan Abenius, was an ironmaster.

Abenius enrolled at Uppsala University and successfully passed the court exams in 1836.

== Career ==
In 1840, Abenius was appointed acting district judge in the Åkerbo Hundred District. He later transitioned and took office as chief district judge in the Danderyd Ship District in 1861, and stepped down in 1867. Subsequently, Abenius assumed the chief district judge position in the Livgedinget Hundred District.

== Family ==
Abenius married Haralda Eleonora Andersson (1819–1901), whose father was Anders Ahrengren.

Following his death in 1895, Abenius was laid to rest at Södertälje Cemetery.

== Appointments ==
- Knight of the Order of the Polar Star
