= Carnegie Art Award =

Swedish art award event

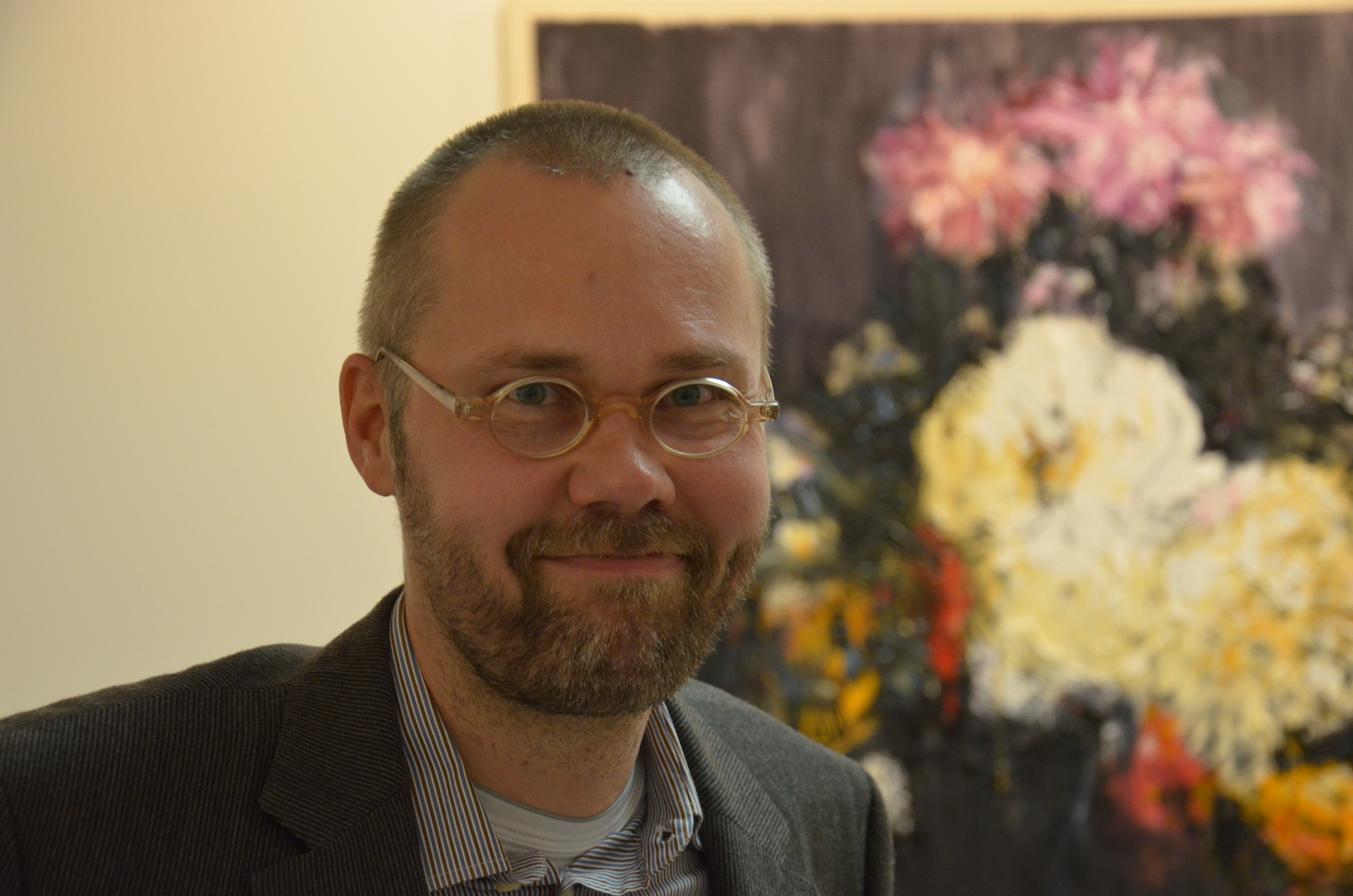
Heikki Marila, winner of First Prize, 2012

The Carnegie Art Award was a Swedish art award event established in 1998 by Swedish financial group Carnegie Investment Bank to recognize and promote Nordic contemporary painting and artists. With a total prize sum of SEK 2.1m, the Carnegie Art Award was one of the world’s largest art awards.

The event took place every second year from 2003 to 2014 and consisted of four parts: an exhibition on tour in all Nordic countries, a book and a film presenting the artists and their work, and the awards proper to the three winning artists. Further, one young artist was awarded a scholarship.

In order to participate, artists had to be born or live in one of the Nordic countries. They could then be nominated by one of about 30 professionals in the field of contemporary art. A jury then selected the works to be included in the exhibition and the award winners.

== Laureates ==
Year	First Prize SEK 1,000,000	Second Prize SEK 600,000	Third Prize SEK 400,000	Scholarship SEK 100,000
1998	Ulrik Samuelsson, Sweden	Torsten Andersson, Sweden	Jussi Niva, Finland	
1999	Rolf Hansson, Sweden	Silja Rantanen, Finland	Clay Ketter, Sweden	Tal R, Denmark
2000	Mari Slaattelid, Norway	Hreinn Friðfinnsson, Iceland	Petri Hytönen, Finland	John Kørner, Denmark
2001	Jan Håfström, Sweden	Carolus Enckell, Finland	Johan Scott, Finland	Jens Fänge, Sweden
2002	Troels Wörsel, Denmark	Lena Cronqvist, Sweden	Tal R, Denmark	David Svensson, Sweden
2004	Anette H. Flensburg, Denmark	Olav Christopher Jenssen, Norway	Elina Brotherus, Finland	
2006	Karin Mamma Andersson, Sweden	Eggert Pétursson, Iceland	Petra Lindholm, Finland	Sirous Namazi, Sweden
2008	Torsten Andersson, Sweden	Jesper Just, Denmark	John Kørner, Denmark	Nathalie Djurberg, Sweden
2010	Kristján Guðmundsson, Iceland	Kristina Jansson, Sweden	Felix Gmelin, Sweden	Marie Søndergaard Lolk, Denmark
2012	Heikki Marila, Finland	Ann Edholm, Sweden	Christian Schmidt-Rasmussen, Denmark	Klara Lidén, Sweden
2014	Dag Erik Elgin, Norway	Sophie Tottie, Sweden	A Kassen, Denmark	Davið Örn Halldórsson, Iceland
