= Carnegie, New York =

Hamlet in New York, United States

Coordinates: 42°44′50″N 78°50′43″W

Carnegie is a hamlet in the town of Hamburg in Erie County, New York, United States.
