= Otto Hesselbom =

Swedish landscape painter

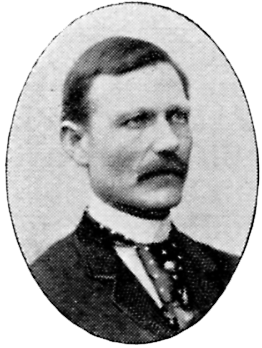
Otto Hesselbom, from the Svenskt Porträttgalleri XX

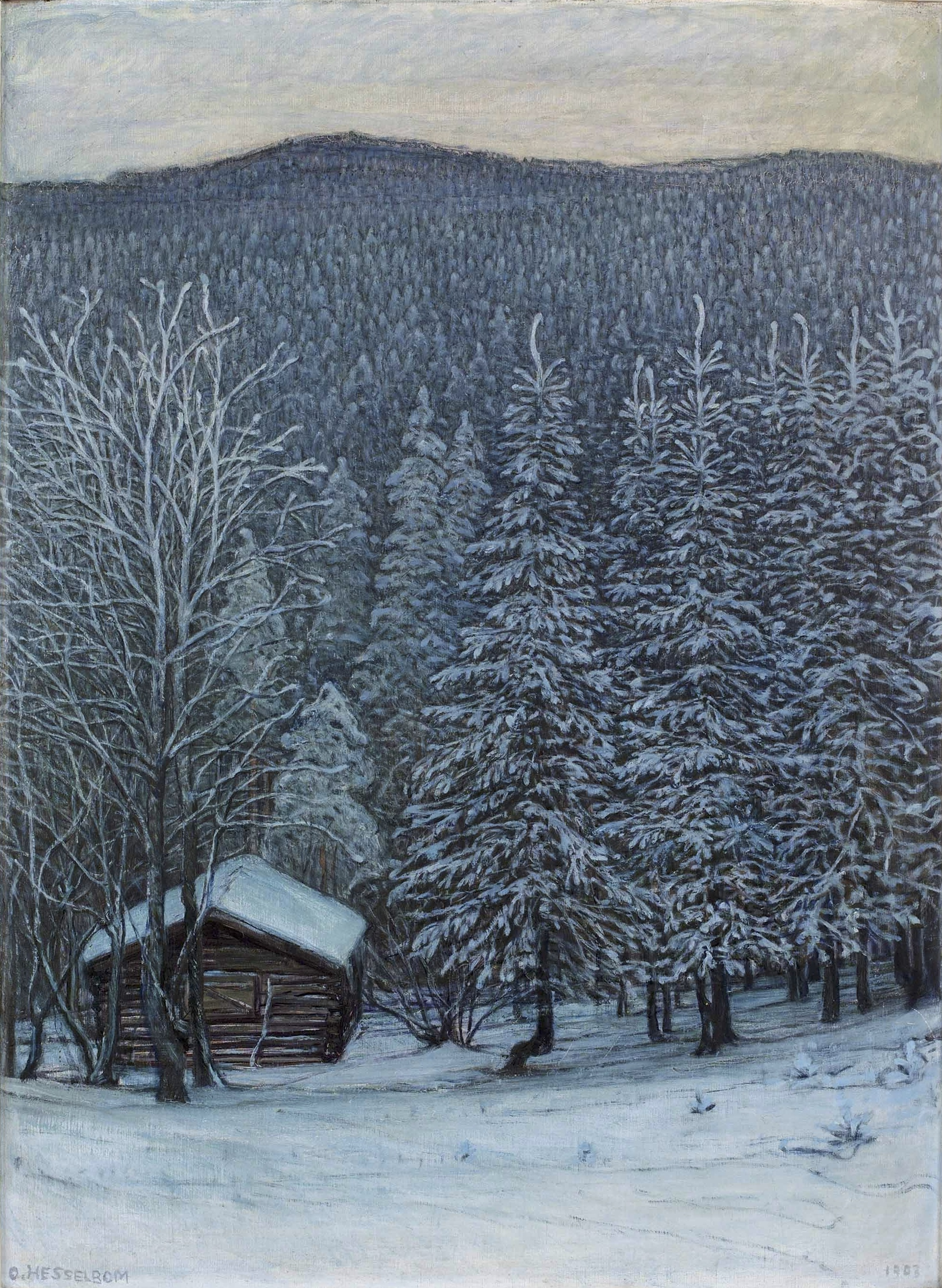
Skymning (1903)

Johan Otto Hesselbom (13 July 1848 – 20 June 1913) was a Swedish landscape painter.

== Biography ==
Hesselbom was born at Ånimskogs parish in Dalsland, Sweden. His father was a farmer who held several offices in the local village, but died in 1854, when Otto was only six. His mother attempted to maintain the farm for several years, but was eventually unsuccessful. Hesselbom suffered from a condition that gave him random muscular spasms and was physically unsuited to farm labor. In 1868, he went to Stockholm to attend the Tekniska Skolan and learn a trade. He discovered that he had a talent for art, but financial difficulties prevented him from completing his studies. He was able to find a position with the Swedish Evangelical Mission and stay at their shelter. This led to two years of study at their mission school.

In 1876, he became a pastor at Luleå in Norrbotten. The workload and the climate proved to be too much for him, so he used some doctrinal disagreements as an excuse for leaving. After his health improved, he returned as a representative of the Mission Covenant Church of Sweden. In 1877, he married Johanna Englund (1850–1890). In 1882, he joined the Baptist Union of Sweden and moved to Stockholm with his family where he returned to focusing on his artistic abilities.

Thanks to a recommendation from the Tekniska Skolan, he was given permission to copy paintings at the Nationalmuseum. This led to an acquaintance with museum director Per Daniel Holm (1835–1903), who also taught at the Royal Swedish Academy of Fine Arts. He arranged for Hesselbom to enroll there; beginning his art career in earnest at the age of forty.

He left the academy in 1895 and, the following year, one of his works was exhibited in Berlin. His first major showing was at the General Art and Industrial Exposition of Stockholm in 1897. This was followed by exhibits in Venice (1901), Budapest, Paris (1906) and Vienna. By 1906, he was able to afford his own villa at Säffle in Värmland. He died during 1913 at By parish in Värmland. In 1913, his widow donated many of his works to galleries in Sweden. Some were purchased by galleries in Venice and Vienna. In 1920, his gravesite at Ånimskog's cemetery was decorated with a medallion and bust, created by sculptor, Oscar Vitalis Gustafson (1888–1952).

== Other sources ==
- Lidman, Peter; Löfgren, Tommy (1999) Ars longa, vita brevis : Konsten är lång, livet är kort : Otto Hesselbom 1848-1913 (Dalslands museum)
- Jäder, Karl (1952) Otto Hesselbom : ett konstnärsöde (Stockholm: Nord)
