= Heikki Marila =

Finnish visual artist (born 1966)

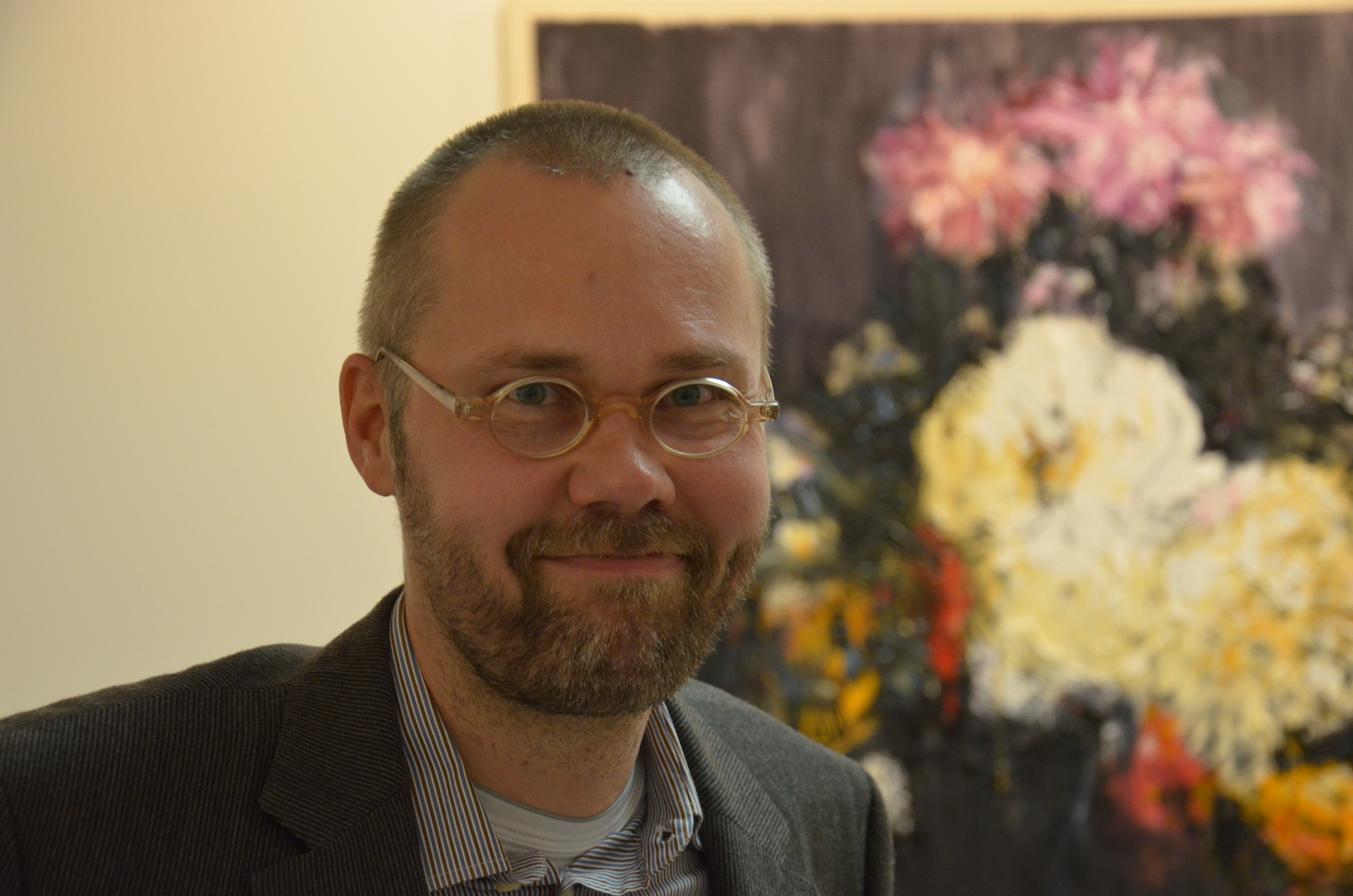
Heikki Marila, pictured in Stockholm, Sweden

Heikki Marila (born 1966 in Lahti, Finland) is a Finnish visual artist known for his large-scale oil paintings and allusions to art history, including biblical motifs, portraiture and still life compositions. His expressive paintings are typically infused with paradoxical drama: they play on contrasts – spirituality, beauty and the sublime are mixed with fiery carnality and a hint of revulsion. His paintings possess a powerfully physical materiality, which is heightened by an ongoing dialogue between figurative and non-figurative elements and by his thickly applied layers of oil paint. In his recent work, Marila captures the intensity of 17th century painting traditions, which he reinterprets through the lens of contemporary social and visual themes.

Marila graduated from the Turku School of Fine Arts in 1992. He has exhibited widely around Finland, the Nordic countries and Europe. His works are represented in numerous notable collections, including the Sara Hildén Art Museum, the Wäinö Aaltonen Museum of Art and the Jenny and Antti Wihuri Foundation Art Collection. He is the winner of the 2012 Carnegie Art Award. Marila has been represented by Galerie Forsblom since 2015. He lives and works in Turku, Finland.
