= Carnegie, Georgia =

Unincorporated community in Georgia, US

Coordinates: 31°38′35″N 84°46′45″W

Carnegie is an unincorporated community in Randolph County, in the U.S. state of Georgia.

== History ==
A variant name was "Grubbs". The present name is after Andrew Carnegie, the industrialist and philanthropist. A post office called Grubb opened in 1892, the post office was renamed Carnegie in 1903, and the post office closed in 1967. The Georgia General Assembly incorporated the place as the "Town of Carnegie" in 1910. The town's charter was dissolved in 1995.
