= Felix Gmelin =

Felix Gmelin (born March 24, 1962, Heidelberg, Germany) is a video- and installation-artist and painter, based in Stockholm.

He has shown work internationally in exhibitions including Always Already Passé at Gavin Brown's Enterprise in New York City, Storm From Paradise at Arnolfini in Bristol, Painting Modernism Black at Galleri Olsson in Stockholm, Delays and Revolutions at the 2003 Venice Biennale and Balancing Acts at Centre Culturel Suedois in Paris. Gmelin studied at the Konsthögskolan Forum in Malmö, 1979–1983, and the Kungliga Konsthögskolan, Stockholm, from 1983 to 1988. He is represented by Galerie Nordenhake in Stockholm.
