= Henrik Lund =

Henrik Lund may refer to:

- Henrik Lund (painter) (1879–1935), Norwegian painter and graphic artist
- Henrik Lund (academic) (born 1960), Danish engineer and professor at Aalborg University

== See also ==
- Henrik Lundh (1895–1985), Norwegian civil servant
- Henrik L'Abée-Lund (born 1986), Norwegian biathlete
- Henning Jakob Henrik Lund (1875–1948), Greenlandic lyricist, painter and priest
