= Dean Carnegie =

American stage magician, escape artist and painter

Dean Alan Carnegie is an American stage magician, escape artist and painter. He has appeared on numerous television programs and has performed for three different US Presidents. He is called 'The Artist of Mystery'.

Dean Carnegie

== History ==
Born in Baltimore, Maryland, he grew up on a horse and cattle farm in Fauquier County, Virginia. He became interested in magic at the age of 8 after watching the movie Houdini starring Tony Curtis. Later a performance of the Houdini Water Torture Cell by magician Doug Henning helped to seal his fascination of the art of magic. In his formative years as a magician he learned mostly from magic books. He loved magic but his first love was escapes because he had been highly influenced by the life of Houdini. One year the local branch of his Post Office challenged him to escape from one of their postal service mailbags and he successfully escaped. Carnegie performed as often as he could in his teens and after he graduated he enrolled in a special course in magic called The Chavez Course of Magic and Manipulation.

== Artist ==
Carnegie won a scholarship for art school, but instead put all his attention towards performing. In 1997, Carnegie began painting again. His subject matter is usually focused on magicians. He has created more than 30 magic-related works of art. His artwork has appeared in numerous magazines. The July/August 2005 issue of Elan magazine featured one of his paintings on the cover. In August & September 2007 two of his paintings appeared on the cover of MAGIC, .

== Magic ==
In 2001, Carnegie held the office of Mid-Atlantic Regional Vice President for the Society of American Magicians. From 2002-2005 Carnegie performed in his own theatre dubbed The Underground Magic Theatre in Sterling, Virginia. Today Carnegie is a full-time performing magician based in Nashville, Tennessee, where he moved during the Covid-19 pandemic. He also writes a bi-monthly column on magic for a magic periodical. He has co-authored two books on escapes called The Escape Biz Volumes 1&2. The Washington Post wrote about him, "Take Howie Mandel's boyish bald charm, mix it with David Copperfield's magical charisma and poof! You get Dean Carnegie, known as Carnegie: Artist of Mystery."

== Steampunk Wizard ==
In 2013, Carnegie debuted a new show based on the world of Steampunk called 'The Steampunk Illusionist'.

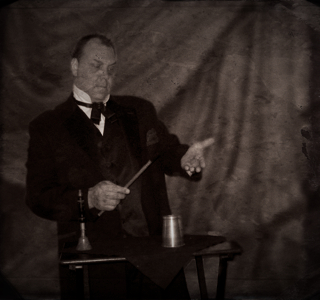
Carnegie the Steampunk Magician

== Magic Historian ==
Dean Carnegie is one of the leading magic historians in the world, as well as a leading historian on HOUDINI. Since 2011 he has written for https://www.themagicdetective.com/ This is a Magic History Blog with over 700 articles on magicians and magic history. In late 2018, Carnegie debuted The Magic Detective Podcast, the podcast for all things related to magic history. Also in 2018, French TV ARTE featured Dean Carnegie in a documentary on Houdini. This was dubbed in French and German. https://www.youtube.com/watch?v=eH5DPz0zrKs

== Publications ==
- The Escape Biz Volume 1, (2005)
- The Escape Biz Volume 2, (2006)
- All Things Magical, Column for Kidabra Journal (2009–present)
