= Erik Penser =

Swedish financier and businessman (born 1942)

- Born: August 22, 1942 (age 83); Eslöv, Sweden
- Occupation: Financier

Nils Wilhelm Erik Penser (born August 22, 1942) is a Swedish financier and businessman.

Penser was born in Eslöv, Sweden, the son of Wilhelm Penser, a lawyer, and Elisabeth (née Herrmann). After having studied law at Lund University, Erik Penser commenced a career as a stockbroker at Bankirfirman Langenskiöld, which later became Carnegie Investment Bank. Together with Tomas Fischer he worked intensively to develop the firm's business, laying the foundation for his private wealth. Penser's strategy was risky; he bought shares, used them as collateral and borrowed even more money to leverage his holdings. Eventually he gained the controlling interest of several large companies on the Stockholm Stock Exchange.

During the 1980s Penser was one of Sweden's most influential businessmen. Through his holding company, Yggdrasil, he controlled both Nobel Industrier and Finans AB Gamlestaden. His massive financial leverage and the harsh business environment experienced during the Swedish banking crisis in 1990–1994 forced Penser to cease control of his holdings, which were sold to Nordbanken (which became Nordea) for the symbolic sum of SEK 1 each. At a press conference Björn Wahlström, the chairman of Nordbanken, said that Erik Penser was 'destitute and finished as a businessman'. The transaction resulted in a prolonged legal dispute between Penser and Nordbanken.

In 1992 Penser regained control of Yggdrasil, the consideration was once again SEK 1. The vice Chairman of Nordbanken, Jacob Palmstierna, admitted that Penser had been under extreme pressure when he was forced to sign the agreement with Nordbanken. Since then Penser has rebuilt an estimated net worth of SEK 1 billion, with interests in both Sweden and abroad. In Sweden, his main holdings includes Erik Penser Bankaktiebolag, with activities in corporate finance, trading, research and private wealth management and Pensum, an insurance and pension advisory firm. Erik Penser resides, since 1976, in Compton Beauchamp, England.

Erik Penser is known as a distinguished collector, collecting – amongst many objects – old share certificates, film posters, magazines and bank notes.
