= Carnegie Building (Troy, New York) =

Building in Troy, New York, US

Coordinates: 42.73043°N 73.68316°W

The Carnegie Building is the current home of the Cognitive Science Department at Rensselaer Polytechnic Institute in Troy, New York. It is one of the westernmost buildings on the campus and as such provides scenic views overlooking the city of Troy and the Hudson River. The four-story building is named for Andrew Carnegie who donated $125,000 for its construction, which was completed in 1906.

Carnegie Building

== History ==
Fires in 1862 and 1904 damaged buildings of downtown Troy and the RPI campus. The destruction in 1862 prompted the construction of the Main Building (literally the main building of Rensselaer at the time). The destruction of the Main Building in 1904 prompted the institute to consider expanding the campus. Being built around a hill, the Institute considered extending the campus downhill within the downtown Troy area and even considered leaving Troy altogether by accepting Columbia University's proposed merger with its New York City campus. Ultimately, the decision was made to remain in Troy but move uphill, away from the downtown area.

In 1905 Andrew Carnegie donated $125,000 to replace the Main Building. As part of the institute's plan to move uphill, the 10-acre (40,000 m^{2}) Walter Phelps Warren estate was acquired. There the Carnegie Building was erected, made of Harvard brick and Indiana limestone. It was completed in September 1906 at a cost of $133,000. The Carnegie Building was dedicated along with the Walker Laboratory on June 12, 1907.

== Architecture ==
The building was designed by architects Whitfield & King. Henry D. Whitfield was Andrew Carnegie's brother-in-law.

In addition to being built with Harvard brick and Indiana limestone - concrete was used, steel floors, and partitions were used to split rooms. This fireproof building had terrazzo floors and its walls lined with white tiling.

On the first floor, the four large recitation rooms were utilized by the departments of Geodesy and Drawings while the second floor was occupied by the department of Mechanics and Mathematics.

The third floor has a small drawing room and several classrooms. The topmost fourth floor consisted of the largest drawing room of its time (sixty by one hundred feet,) with a small side room for blue-printing.

The walls of corridors and the underclass lobby contain drawings and photographs of structures designed by RPI male students, while the walls of the upperclass lobby contain etchings of familiar classic figures.

"...Located at the head of the entrance of the Institute grounds; the interior is admirably arranged for the purposes intended, well lighted, heated and ventilated; which all go toward making the work of the students easy."

== Current research ==
The building is home to the Cogworks laboratory, which directs research in cognitive science.

The research and doctoral program taking place in the Cognitive Science Department is currently having its current goals set on integrating an interdisciplinary department where the research and teaching is aimed at three powerful, driving ideas:

- "Next generation" artificial intelligence: designing and constructing artificial cognitive systems that can span across the full range of cognition, from the low-level perception/action to a high level of reasoning.
- "Next generation" computation cognitive modeling: designing and implementing cognitive architectures so that they go beyond the current available structure towards Allen Newell’s original dream of a design that accurately reflects the full range of cognitive processes present in natural cognitive systems.
- Cognitive engineering: engineering the interface between the natural cognitive systems and task environments by exploiting experimental data.

One small program that is held in this building is the Experimetrix where students could sign up to participate in experiments that deal with how the brain works or cognitive science. Graduate students and professors work together to collect data and in turn analyze them for further development in cognitive research. Students being participants for this research allows them to receive extra credit for their course if allowed by their professor. This area of experiments is currently being held on the second floor of the building.

There is also the closely related Rensselaer Artificial Intelligence and Reasoning (RAIR) Laboratory, which is located in the Russell Sage Laboratory.
