= Danderyd Ship District =

Historic geographic subdivison in Sweden

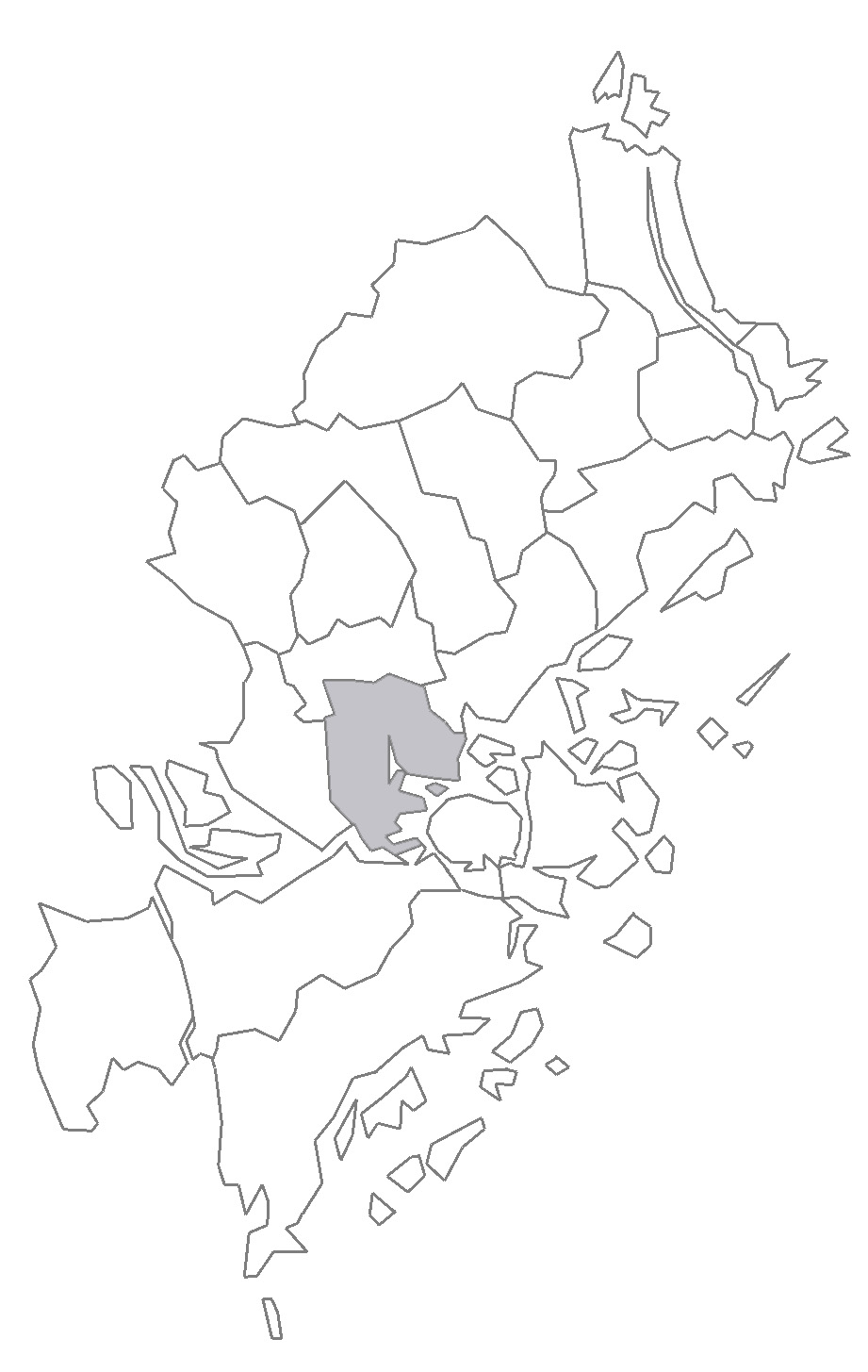
Location of Danderyd Ship District in Stockholm County

Danderyd Ship District, or Danderyds skeppslag, was a district of Uppland in Sweden. The ship district (skeppslag) was the equivalent of a hundred (hundare) within Roslagen.

== See also ==
- Danderyd Municipality
