= Carnegie Investment Bank =

Nordic investment bank

DNB Carnegie Investment Bank
- Type: Privately held company
- Industry: Banking; Financial services
- Founded: 1803
- Founder: David Carnegie, Sr.
- Headquarters: Stockholm, Sweden
- Key people: Anders Johnsson, Chairman; Tony Elofsson, CEO
- Products: Investment banking Brokerage; Equity research Wealth management
- AUM: SEK 166 billion (2020)
- Number of employees: 600 (2Q 2019)
- Website: www.carnegie.se

DNB Carnegie Investment Bank AB is a Swedish financial services group with activities in securities brokerage, investment banking and private banking.

Founded in 1803, Carnegie is headquartered in Stockholm with offices across the Nordic region, as well as in London, New York, and Luxembourg. The company has market leading positions in equities research and brokerage, corporate finance advisory and private wealth management. Carnegie’s customers include institutional investors, corporates, financial institutions, private equity firms, governments and high-net-worth individuals. In 2018 Carnegie had revenues of SEK 2.4 billion and as of 31 December 2018 assets of SEK 12.6 billion. Assets under management amounts to SEK 110 billion and the number of employees is approximately 600 as of Q2 2019.

Due to the 2008 financial crisis, Carnegie Investment Bank AB was nationalized on 10 November 2008. In May 2009, the bank was acquired in a joint venture by the private equity company Altor Equity Partners and the investment company Bure Equity. The ambition is to re-establish Carnegie as the leading independent investment bank in the Nordic region.

In 2023 Carnegie acquired Erik Penser Banks Wealth Management and Corporate Business. The same year Carnegie announced the start of Montrose, a savings plattform. In 2024, October 21, the Norwegian bank DNB Bank announced their intention to acquire Carnegie Holding AB and Carnegie Investment Bank AB. Once the acquisition was finalised, the company names were changed to DNB Carnegie Holding AB and DNB Carnegie Investment Bank AB.

== History ==
=== Background ===
Carnegie was established as a trading company in 1803 when David Carnegie, Sr., a Scotsman, founded D. Carnegie & Co AB in Gothenburg. The management of the company was later succeeded by Carnegie's nephew, David Carnegie Jr., who later returned to Scotland, leaving the company, which by then had considerable interests in brewing and sugar production, in the hands of Oscar Ekman. When David Carnegie, Sr. died in 1890, Ekman inherited a substantial amount of shares and obtained majority ownership of the company. In 1907 the company was once again taken over, this time by Ekman's son-in-law Karl Langenskiöld, whereupon the formerly brewing and sugar businesses were divested. In the wake of the Kreuger crash, Langenskiöld founded a brokerage business in his name, Bankirfirman Langenskiöld, which is the foundation that the Carnegie of today rests upon.

In 1980 the company retrieved its name Carnegie. By this time financier Erik Penser held the controlling interest of the company. In 1988 Carnegie was taken over by what later became Nordea and remained in their hands until 1994, when a newly formed company, Carnegie Holding, bought the bank. The new holding company was to 55% owned by British merchant bank Singer & Friedlander and to 45% owned by Carnegie's employees. In 2001, Carnegie Holding company was merged with D. Carnegie & Co, making the latter the parent company in the Carnegie Group. The company was listed on the Stockholm Stock Exchange, but was delisted in connection with the nationalization. Since 2004, business is operated through Carnegie Investment Bank.

== Organisation ==
The company is divided into three divisions; Securities (equity research, sales & trading), Investment Banking (corporate finance advisory and capital markets activities) and Private Banking.

== Ownership ==
Due to the 2008 financial crisis, Carnegie Investment Bank AB was, to avoid bankruptcy, taken over by the Swedish National Debt Office on 10 November 2008. The bank had crossed the restrictions from the Swedish supervisory authority, Finansinspektionen, when lending too high of a sum to one client, property magnate Maths O. Sundqvist. The largest shareholders at the time were Böös & Enblad AB (9,2%), Moderna Finance AB (6,4%) and Harris Associates fonder (5,3%). In May 2009, the private equity company Altor Equity Partners and the investment company Bure Equity acquired the company.

On 3 September 2010 it was announced that Carnegie was to acquire HQ Bank, a strategic move with the aim to further strengthen its private banking division.

== See also ==
- Carnegie Art Award
- List of banks in Sweden
