= Clothing industry =

Industry encompassing the design, manufacturing, wholesaling and retailing of clothes

Clothing industry, or garment industry, refers to the range of trade and industry sectors involved in the production and value chain of clothing and garments. This includes the textile industry (producers of cotton, wool, fur, and synthetic fibre), embellishment using embroidery, the fashion industry, apparel retailers, and trade in second-hand clothes and textile recycling. Textile factories are also called "mills". Textiles factories or "mills" turn the natural or synthetic materials into Yarn which will be sent for weaving and knitting (process of turning yarn into a textile cloth). Then apparel textile mills make wearable pieces from those textile cloths. The producing sectors build upon a wealth of clothing technology some of which, like the loom, the cotton gin, and the sewing machine heralded industrialization not only of the previous textile manufacturing practices. Clothing industries are also known as allied industries, fashion industries, garment industries, or soft goods industries.

== Terminology ==
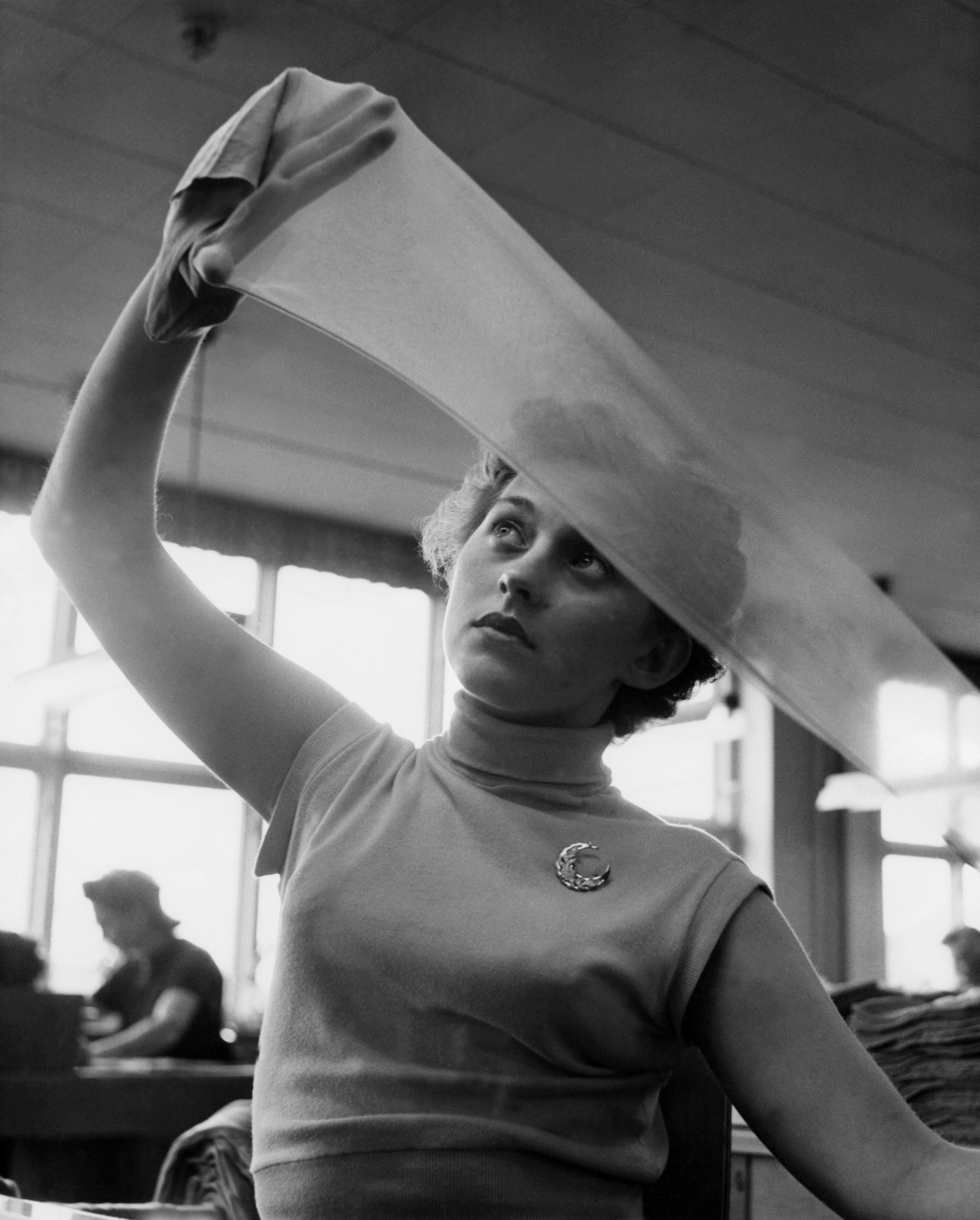
Nylon stocking inspection in Malmö, Sweden, in 1954.

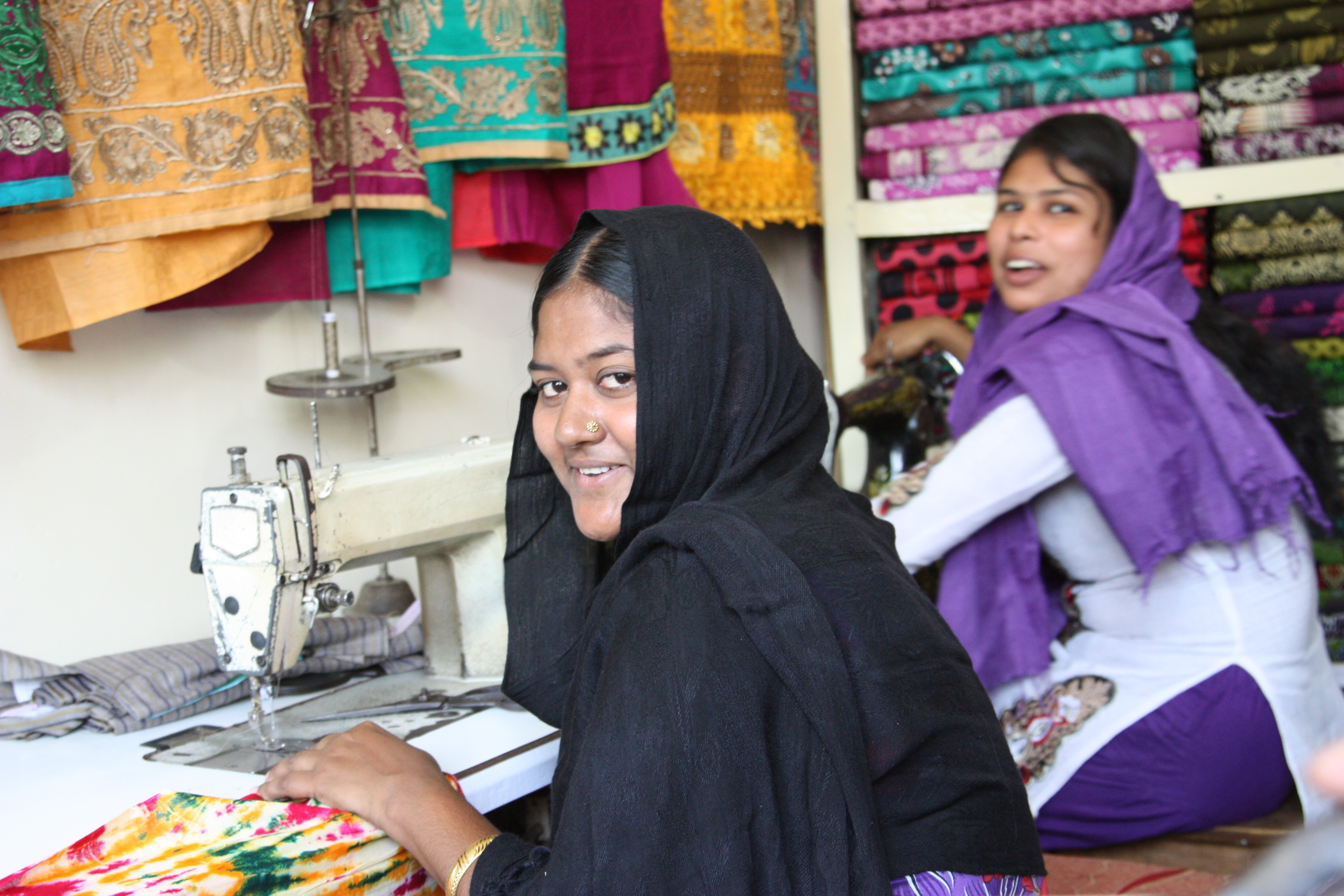
Garment factory workers in Bangladesh, in 2013.

By the early 20th century, the industry in the developed world often involved immigrants in "sweat shops", which were usually legal but were sometimes illegally operated. They employed people in crowded and hostile conditions, working manual sewing machines, and being paid less than a living wage for up to 10-to-13-hour shifts. This trend worsened due to attempts to protect existing industries which were being challenged by developing countries in South East Asia, the Indian subcontinent and Central America. Although globalization saw the manufacturing largely outsourced to overseas labor markets, there has been a trend for the areas historically associated with the trade to shift focus to the more white collar associated industries of fashion design, fashion modeling and retail. Areas historically involved heavily in the "rag trade" includes London (United Kingdom) and Milan (Italy) in Europe, and the SoHo district in New York City (United States). There are considerable overlaps between the terms clothing-/garment-, textile- and fashion industry. The clothing sector is concerned with all types of clothes, from fashion to uniforms, e-textiles and workwear. Textile industry is less concerned with the fashion aspect but produces the fabrics and fibres that are required for tailoring. The fashion industry closely follows and sets fashion trends always supplies the latest in non-functional clothing.

== History ==
Historian Judith Bennett highlights the significant connection between women and the clothing industry, noting that "In both 1381 and 1700, two of every five women found employment in service, and a third worked in textile or clothing manufacturing." This long-standing relationship between women and textile production laid the foundation for shifts in labor patterns during industrialization.

One such shift was the rapid adoption of sewing machines, which first became popular in middle-class households and later among working-class families. This technological change fueled the rise of "outworkers," individuals who worked outside traditional factory settings, often from their homes. These outworkers, primarily women, frequently took on the lowest-paying jobs, becoming integral to an expanding system of subcontracted labor in the clothing industry. By the turn of the 20th century, the significance of this labor force was evident: a 1901 census of Bristol, England, revealed that female outworkers made up nearly one-third of all workers in the clothing industry.

This phenomenon of women leaving their homes to pursue wage labor is not limited to historical contexts in Europe. Researcher Michaela Doutch examines similar patterns in modern Cambodia, where approximately 80 percent of women garment workers are migrants who have left their rural family homes to seek employment in Phnom Penh. Doutch explains that these women are driven by a combination of factors, including diminishing family farmland for agriculture and the growing necessity of earning wages to support their families as traditional subsistence methods decline. She also notes that these rural-to-urban migrants often work not only in factories but also in their homes, contributing to the subcontracting labor market that mirrors historical practices in Europe.

This continuity of subcontracting labor across time and geographic regions underscores the persistent role of women as a flexible and low-cost labor force in the clothing industry. Whether in historical England or contemporary Cambodia, the economic pressures driving women into garment work—and the structures that exploit their labor—remain consistent.

== Production ==
The garment industry is a major contributor to the economies of many countries. The industry for Ready Made Garments has been criticized by labor advocates for the use of sweatshops, piece work and child labor. Working conditions in low-cost countries have received critical media coverage, especially in the aftermath of large-scale disasters like the 2013 Savar building collapse or the Triangle Shirtwaist Factory fire.

In 2016, the largest apparel exporting nations were China ($161 billion), Bangladesh ($28 billion), Vietnam ($25 billion), India ($18 billion), Hong Kong ($16 billion), Turkey ($15 billion) and Indonesia ($7 billion). By 2025, it is projected that the United States market will be worth $385 billion. It is also projected that the e-commerce revenue will be worth $146 billion in the United States by 2023.

=== Production in developing countries ===
The worldwide market for textiles and apparel exports in 2013 according to United Nations Commodity Trade Statistics Database stood at $772 billion. In 2016, the largest apparel exporting nations were China ($161 billion), Bangladesh ($28 billion), Vietnam ($25 billion), India ($18 billion), Hong Kong ($16 billion), Turkey ($15 billion) and Indonesia ($7 billion). Export processing zones (EPZs) are designated areas where manufacturers are able to import materials, process, and assemble goods for re-export, exempt from taxes and duties. Many manufacturers view EPZs as catalysts for economic growth with the minimal possible regulations, thus relocating production to these zones to maximize profits. According to UN Women (formerly known as UNIFEM), women comprise a significant majority of the workforce in EPZs, accounting for 90% in Nicaragua, 80% in Bangladesh, and 75% in Honduras, the Philippines, and Sri Lanka.

==== Bangladesh ====
Many Western multinationals use labour in Bangladesh, which is one of the cheapest in the world: 30 euros per month compared to 150 or 200 in China. In 2005 a factory collapsed and caused the death of 64 people. In 2006, a series of fires killed 85 people and injured 207 others. In 2010, some 30 people died of asphyxiation and burns in two serious fires.

In 2006, tens of thousands of workers mobilized in one of the country's largest strike movements, affecting almost all of the 4,000 factories. The Bangladesh Garment Manufacturers and Exporters Association (BGMEA) used police forces to crack down. Three workers were killed, hundreds more were wounded by bullets, or imprisoned. In 2010, after a new strike movement, nearly 1,000 people were injured among workers as a result of the repression. On 24 April 2013 in the Savar Upazila of Dhaka District, Bangladesh, where a commercial building called Rana Plaza collapsed. The Rana Plaza once stood as an 8 story building that housed many garment factories, including Zara, Joe Fresh, and Walmart. On April 24, 2013, the building collapsed and led to the death of 1,134 people with many more injured. Structural cracks of the Rana Plaza were identified the day before, but many workers were told to still come into work the next day. The Rana Plaza tragedy brought worldwide attention to the reality of the textile industry and modern day textile workers. The search for the dead ended on 13 May 2013. Since then Bangladesh now is one of the most heavily audited apparel sourcing hub in the world. The BBC commissioned a documentary titled “Clothes to Die For,” which was based on this event.

Although many advancements have been made since the early 1900s, "by the early twenty-first century, little had changed for textile workers the world. In the textile industry, most of the employees are female. They move to the cities from the rural areas to work at the textile companies to support their families. Female mill operatives in Bangladesh, for example, earn wages 25% percent lower than men. The average salary was 9,984 taka for women and 10,928 taka for men (equivalent of 79 euros). In 2023, Trade Union demanded minimum 2300 taka (182.92 euros) monthly salary for garment workers, however, the monthly salary only increased to 1200 taka (106 euros). A common tactic by manufacturers is to outsource and move the labour to "countries with the lowest wages, and by proxy, the lowest working standards". In the twenty-first century, women are still often underpaid and undervalued in terms of the textiles they produce and "because of its historical association as being "cheap" and "flexible". Women's labor within the textile and garment industries is particularly suited to the dynamics of production along the global assembly line. It is cheap both in terms of prevailing wage levels and in terms of the unhealthy and unsafe conditions under which women often work".

==== Cambodia ====
Cambodia is the world's eighth largest exporter of clothing and footwear. The garment industry in Cambodia represents the largest portion of the country's manufacturing sector, accounting for 80% of all exports. In 2012, exports grew to $4.61 billion, up 8% over 2011. In the first half of 2013, the Cambodian garment industry reported exports worth $1.56 billion. In January 2024, Cambodia's foreign market value was $846 million USD, which was 30% increase of the same month of previous year.The sector employs 800,000 workers in 2019 of which maximum are female. The sector operates largely in the final phase of garment production, which includes turning yarns and fabrics into garments, as the country lacks a strong textile manufacturing base. European Union (EU) is the biggest export market for Cambodian market. Approximately 40 percent of garment exports are from Cambodia. Cambodia benefited from EU's Everything but Arms Scheme (EBA)', which allowed Cambodia duty-free access to EU's market for all exports. However in 2020, the EU suspended some of the EBA benefits from Cambodia due to poor human-rights records.

==== China ====
China has held the position of the world's largest clothing manufacturer for over a decade, commanding over 50% of global apparel production. In 2021, the country's apparel market generated an impressive revenue of $303 billion USD. In 2025, women apparel market revenue is projected to grow $185.27 billion USD and overall market revenue is projected to $342 billion USD. The province of Guangdong serves as the epicenter of clothing production, housing a vast network of over 28,000 exporting enterprises. In the first quarter of 2022 alone, the province's clothing manufacturing sector contributed $6.3 billion USD in export value. However, since 2015, China's clothing sector has exhibited a notable shift towards sustainability, with a reduced emphasis on expanding scale and a greater focus on technology-driven approaches to enhance productivity. This transformation has been largely motivated by the escalating labor costs, compelling businesses to transition from labor-intensive practices to more efficient and automated methods.

==== Ethiopia ====
Employees of Ethiopian garment factories, who work for brands such as Guess, H&M or Calvin Klein, receive a monthly salary of 26 dollars per month. These very low wages have led to low productivity, frequent strikes and high turnover. Some factories have replaced all their employees on average every 12 months, according to the 2019 report of the Stern Centre for Business and Human Rights at New York University.

The report states: "Rather than the docile and cheap labour force promoted in Ethiopia, foreign-based suppliers have met employees who are unhappy with their pay and living conditions and who want to protest more and more by stopping work or even quitting. In their eagerness to create a "made in Ethiopia" brand, the government, global brands and foreign manufacturers did not anticipate that the base salary was simply too low for workers to make a living from."

==== India ====
Indian clothing and apparel industry is one of the largest employment generating sector after agriculture in India and is sixth largest exporter in the world. India is the second largest producer of fibre in the world. Cotton is the most produced fibre in India. Other fibres produced in India include silk, wool, and jute. 60% of the Indian textile Industry is cotton based. Indian clothing industry dates back to Harappan civilisation and is one of the oldest clothing manufacturing industry in the world. India produces various types of clothing including woven and knitted clothing. Mumbai, Surat, Tiruppur, Ahmedabad, Bangalore, Delhi, Ludhiana and Chennai are important manufacturing centres of India.

==== Pakistan ====
The textile industry is the largest manufacturing industry in Pakistan, the fourth largest global producer of cotton, and the eighth largest exporter of textile products in Asia. It contributes to 8.5% of GDP and provides employment to 30% of the 56 million strong national workforce, or 40% of industrial employment. Punjab Province dominates the textile industry in Pakistan. Realising the economic and employment implications of non-compliance for Pakistan, the national government has developed an International Labour Standard (ILS) Compliance and Reporting Programme to improve workplace practices in the textile industry together with the ILO.

Pakistan has a significant garment manufacturing sector, supplying clothing to both domestic and international markets. The industry includes garment manufacturers involved in cut-and-sew production, private labeling, printing, embroidery, and garment finishing, serving fashion brands, retailers, and other businesses.

== Retail ==
Retail in the clothing industry involves the selling of clothes to consumers through physical and online stores. Clothing retailers range from small, independently owned boutiques to large chain stores and department stores. The retail sector is a vital part of the clothing industry, as it connects manufacturers and consumers, drives demand for clothing, and contributes significantly to the economy. The retail clothing industry has undergone significant changes in recent years due to the rise of e-commerce. Online retailers such as Amazon, ASOS, and Zara have disrupted the traditional brick-and-mortar retail model and forced established retailers to adapt to new consumer behaviors. Many traditional retailers have invested in their online platforms to offer a seamless shopping experience across multiple channels. Retailers often use a range of strategies to attract and retain customers. These include offering discounts and promotions, providing excellent customer service, and creating a strong brand identity. In recent years, there has been an increasing focus on sustainability and ethical fashion, and retailers are adapting their strategies to cater to these trends. Many retailers are now offering sustainable clothing lines and using environmentally friendly production processes to appeal to consumers who prioritize sustainability. The clothing retail sector is highly competitive, with retailers constantly innovating to stay ahead of the competition. Fast fashion retailers such as H&M, Zara, Shein, UNIQLO, and Forever 21 have gained popularity by offering trendy clothing at affordable prices. However, the environmental and social impact of fast fashion has come under scrutiny in recent years, leading to a rise in popularity of sustainable and ethical fashion.

Fast fashion is a major source of retail sales for the clothing industry. Retailers do not typically manufacture their own items and henceforth they purchase their goods from wholesalers and manufactures. This makes it so that they can mark down their prices, and make them cheaper to consumers. This process is called a Supply Chain, which is the way in which companies and suppliers are able to distribute products to consumers. Fast-fashion based companies can quickly manufacture and distribute their designs. These quick made designs often result in extra waste, low-paid workers, and overconsumption. Fast fashion companies include Zara, Forever21, Old Navy, and Gap. Overall, the retail sector plays a vital role in the clothing industry, connecting manufacturers with consumers and driving demand for clothing. The sector is constantly evolving and adapting to changes in consumer behavior and societal trends.

== Sustainability and working environment ==
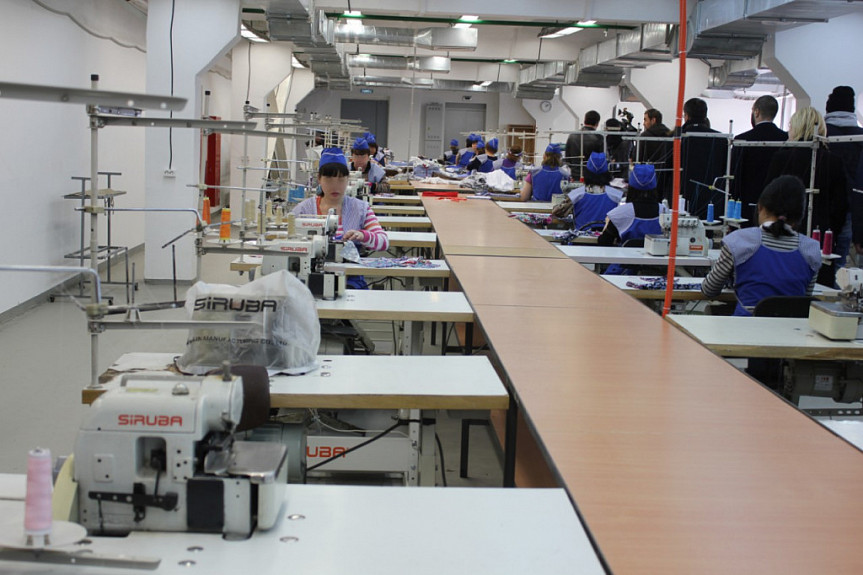
Clothing factory in Buryatia, Russia

Fashion industry is causing significant environmental impact. It is causing 10% of total carbon emission, which is equivalent of total emission generated by European Union. Additionally, 500,000 tons of microfibers are being released into ocean from washing clothes. Brands also use synthetic fibers like polyester and nylon, releasing microplastics in the ocean. Also, it takes hundreds of years to biodegrade. According to The true cost (2015) documentary, "The world consumes around 80 billion new pieces of clothing every year, 400% more than the consumption twenty years ago".

The clothing industry has grown to an eco-friendly packaging solution to limit the amount of waste. The regulator, Fast-Moving Consumer Goods (FMCG) companies, and retailers are contributing their efforts to the eco-friendly packaging commitment. China banned imports on packing waste in 2017, Canada implemented Zero Plastic Waste in 2018, and U.S introduced bills around reducing single use packing waste. The nonprofit organisation As You Sow produced a report in 2010 which argued that "apparel industry leaders have made changes to their purchasing practices ... to improve working conditions in factories".

=== Trade unions ===
Workers in the clothing industry are represented by a number of international and domestic trade unions.

== See also ==
- Accord on Fire and Building Safety in Bangladesh
- Alliance for Bangladesh Worker Safety
- Fashion industry
  - Fashion design services
  - Fashion accessory
- List of fabric names
- List of textile fibres
- Nylon riots
- Savile Row tailoring
- Shoemaking
- Sweatshop
- Tailor
- Textile
- Textile industry
- The FABRIC Act (proposed US amendment to the Fair Labor Standards Act of 1938, introduced May 2022)
- Uniforms
