= Metro International =

Swedish media company

Metro International, S.A.
- Type: Public
- Traded as: Nasdaq Stockholm: MTROA; Nasdaq Stockholm: MTROB
- Founded: 1995
- Headquarters: Luxembourg
- Owners: AB Custos
- Website: readmetro.com

Metro International is a Swedish media company based in Luxembourg that publishes the freesheet newspaper Metro.

The company was founded by Per Andersson, and started as a subsidiary of the Modern Times Group along with Viasat Broadcasting. It is now controlled through the Mats Qviberg-owned-investment company Custos. The first edition of the newspaper was published as Metro Stockholm and distributed in the Stockholm Metro. As of 2012, all European editions have been sold.

== Metro newspapers ==
The Amsterdam version of Metro from August 31, 2007, shows a headline about vandalism on Wikipedia.

As of October 2009, there were 56 daily editions in 15 languages and in 19 countries across Europe, North and South America, and Asia, for an audience of more than 17 million daily readers and 37 million weekly readers.

Metro newspaper editions are distributed in high-traffic commuter zones or in public transport networks via a combination of self-service racks and by-hand distributors on weekdays. Saturday editions are published in Stockholm, Santiago, São Paulo, and Lima. The distribution points are located in high-density population areas.

Metro International launched several editions in Canada in 2000, leading to the creation of several commuter newspaper competitors, such as Sun Media's 24 Hours.

The local name of Metro newspaper editions sometimes vary due to trademark issues. Peruvian, Chilean, and Mexican editions are called Publimetro, and the Spanish edition is called Metro Directo.

Not all newspapers named Metro are part of the Metro International Group. Associated Newspapers publishes another freesheet called Metro in twelve areas around Britain. This UK Metro is not related to Metro International, which used the name Morning News for its (now defunct) free sheet distributed there. However, Metro International and Associated Metro collaborated on the Dublin Metro Herald newspaper (launched 10 October 2005), which they both own a third of, along with The Irish Times. The Dublin Metro newspaper uses the Associated Metro logo and format, however. It is reported that Metro International has plans to launch a rival-free evening newspaper in London.

There are also other examples of newspapers named Metro that are not part of Metro International Group. In Belgium, Mass Transit Media, a joint venture of Concentra and Rossel, publishes the free daily newspaper Metro. In California, United States, Metro Silicon Valley is a free weekly newspaper founded in 1985. Neither of these newspapers have links to Metro International.

In Hong Kong, Metro International sold Metro Daily in 2013 to a local businessman.

=== Timeline of Metro editions ===
- Metro was first launched in Stockholm on 13 February 1995.
- The first international edition was launched in Budapest, Hungary in Hungarian (1998) and became the most popular daily with 400.000 daily edition. The newspaper had two editions, in the countryside and in Budapest. The popular Metro - later renamed as Metropol - was sold to a Hungarian private editor in 2011 and became a target of political fights. The newspaper was closed in 2015. On 7 September 2020, the daily restarted with the British Metro look and the same name, renaming the pro-government tabloid Lokál.
- A German-language edition is published in Switzerland by Metro Publication (Schweiz) AG under the name Metropol on 31 January 2000 as a direct competitor to 20 Minuten. The newspaper ceased publication without announcement on 13 February 2002.
- In 2000, a Spanish edition named Publimetro, and is published in Buenos Aires, Argentina, with a circulation of 390,000. Facing competition from the free daily La Razón published by Grupo Clarín, Publimetro is suspended indefinitely a year later.
- A weekly magazine named Metropop starts publication in Hong Kong on 27 April 2006 (published on Thursdays).
- At the end of 2006, Metro started a dedicated technology paper, Metro Teknik (English section) which is distributed weekly to companies, science parks, and technical universities around Sweden.
- Due to financial difficulties in the press sector in general, and the free press in particular, Metro International closed down its Polish edition on 5 January 2007. Earlier, the Danish afternoon version of the newspaper was closed down, and the business in Finland was sold.
- As of October 2008, the Croatian Metro edition was also cancelled, due to disappointing advertorial income.
- As of 29 January 2009, Metro International closed down its Spanish operations.
- In 2009, Metro sold its US papers.
- As of 31 May 2012, Metro International was de-listed from the NASDAQ OMX Stockholm stock exchange.
- In August 2016, the French version of the newspaper, published since 2002 and property of TF1 since 2011, is discontinued.
- In September 2016, the Portuguese version of the newspaper, published since 2004 and property of Cofina since 2009, is discontinued.
- In August 2019, the newspaper ceased operations in Sweden.
- On 20 March 2020, the last Netherlands edition of the Metro, published since 21 June 1999, was distributed. It continues as an online news platform, owned by Mediahuis Nederland B.V.

== Metro editions by region ==
=== Asia ===
- South Korea: Metro is published in Busan and Seoul. It started as the first free newspaper in South Korea and is the only officially distributed free newspaper in South Korea following the bankruptcy of the free newspaper Daily Nocut News in 2014.
- Hong Kong: Metro was distributed across MTR stations in Kowloon, Hong Kong Island, Tsuen Wan and Tseung Kwan O until 2019, when it stopped publishing newspapers. Since then, it has been an internet-only newspaper.

=== Europe ===
There are national editions in the Czech Republic, Greece, Hungary, Italy, Finland, the Netherlands (online only), Russia, and Sweden (Metro). City editions of Metro are published in many major cities.

Belgium has a bilingual free newspaper with the same name, but it is not owned by Metro International. Likewise, Metro in the United Kingdom is not part of the network. In France, the Metronews has been acquired and merged by the media company LCI - itself property of TF1.

=== North America ===
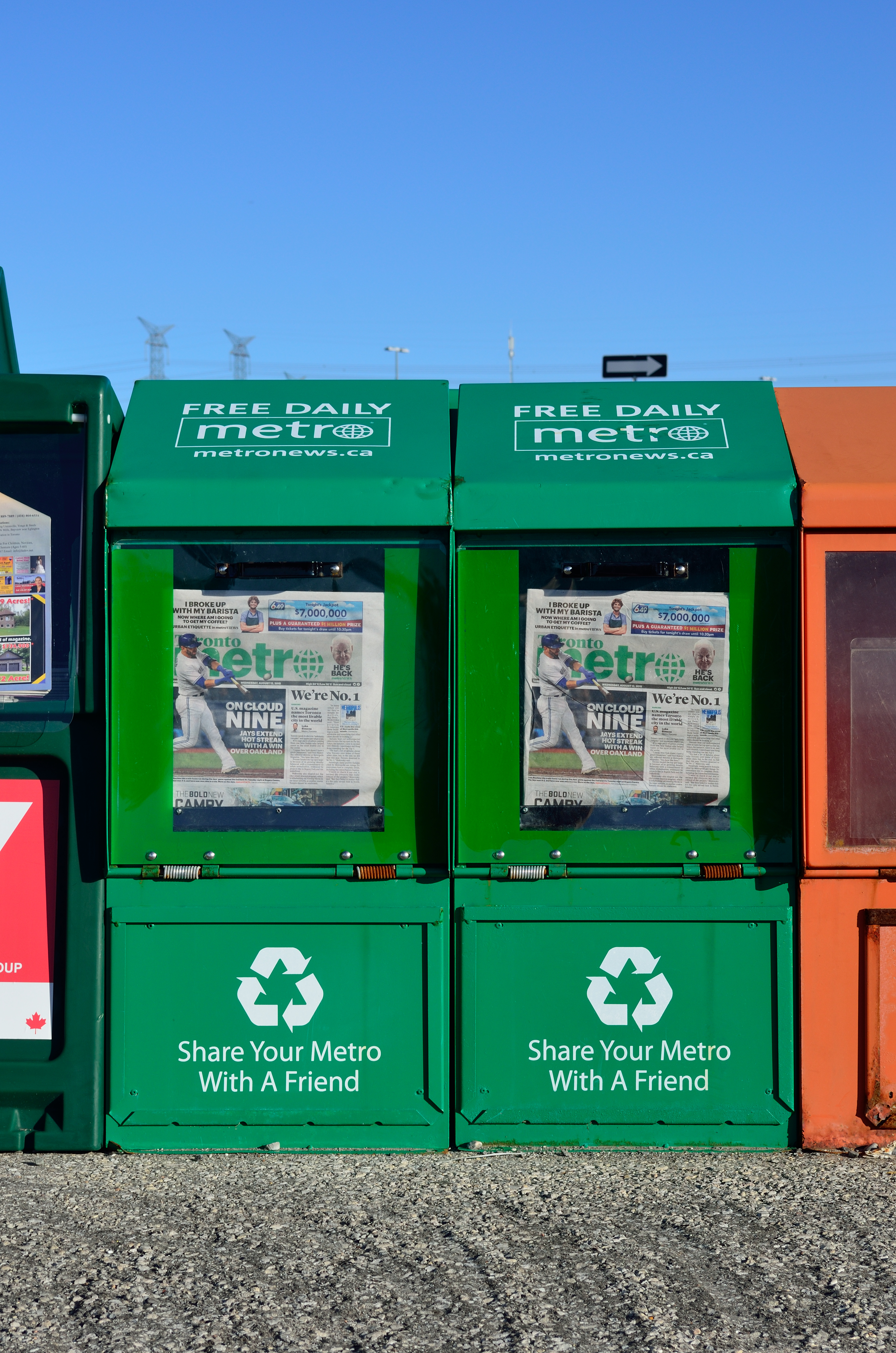
Former Metro newspaper vending boxes in Toronto. It was rebranded in 2017 as StarMetro after merging with Torstar Corporation.

- Canada: The first Canadian Metro paper was launched in Toronto in 2000, and eventually launched in multiple cities across Canada through joint ventures with Canadian companies or through brand licensing. As of 2023, no editions remain.
  - English-language: Became a 50-50 joint venture with Torstar in 2001. In 2017, Postmedia Network acquired Metro in Ottawa and discontinued the publication. Metro International sold most of its stake in English-Canadian newspapers to Torstar in 2011. It continued to hold a 10% stake in the StarMetro newspaper chain published in Calgary, Edmonton, Halifax, Toronto, and Vancouver. Publication ceased on 20 December 2019.
  - French-language: Métro is published in French in Montreal and has been wholly owned by Métro Média since 2018, which licenses the Metro brand. It is distributed throughout Montreal and its suburbs and has a readership of one million. Due to financial difficulties, its last edition was issued on 11 August 2023, and the company has since been declared bankrupt.
- Mexico: Publimetro is published in Mexico City, Monterrey, Morelia, Puebla, Mérida, Leon and Querétaro.
- United States: Editions of Metro, published in their target markets included Metro Boston, now defunct, Metro Puerto Rico, Metro Philadelphia and Metro New York. The latter two were acquired by Schneps Media, which then merged the New York City edition with amNewYork to form AM New York Metro. In July 2025, Schneps sold Metro Philadelphia to O’Rourke Media Group. amNewYork has since dropped "Metro" from its name, leaving Metro Philadelphia as the only remaining Metro paper in the U.S.

Nicaragua: Metro is published in Managua.

Guatemala: Metro is published in Guatemala City.

=== South America ===
- Brazil: Metro is published in major metropolitan regions including Belo Horizonte, and São Paulo
- Chile: Metro is published in major conurbations including Concepción, Rancagua, Santiago, Talcahuano, and Valparaíso
- Colombia: Metro is published in Bogotá, Medellín, Cali, and Barranquilla
- Ecuador: Metro is published in Guayaquil, Quito and Cuenca
- Peru: Metro is published in Lima

== See also ==
- List of newspapers in Canada
- List of newspapers in the Czech Republic
