= Cevian Capital =

Swedish company in Stockholm for investment

- Industry: Hedge fund
- Founded: 1996; 30 years ago
- Founders: Christer Gardell and Lars Förberg
- AUM: US$ 16.5 billion (as of January 2021)

Cevian Capital is a Swedish investment firm founded in 1996 by Christer Gardell and Lars Förberg, both of whom serve as managing partners. It is the largest activist investment firm in Europe. It has offices in Stockholm, Zürich, and London.

Formerly called Amaranth, Cevian has invested in such companies as ABB, Danske Bank, ThyssenKrupp, Volvo, G4S, TeliaSonera, and Lindex, and played a major role in the sale of Skandia to Old Mutual.

== History ==
=== Foundation and founders ===
The company was founded in 1996 by Christer Gardell and Lars Förberg.

Christer Gardell is co-founder and managing partner. Born in 1960, he graduated in business from the Stockholm School of Economics in 1984. After working as a management consultant at McKinsey & Company, he was CEO of AB Custos from 1996 to 2001.

Also holding the title co-founder and managing partner is Lars Förberg, who also graduated from the Stockholm School of Economics. He worked with Gardell at AB Custos from 1997 to 2001 as Chief Investment Officer. Förberg is based in Zürich.

In 2006, Cevian launched Cevian Capital II, the largest dedicated active ownership fund in Europe.

In 2012, at Cevian's urging, Cookson, a British engineering firm, spun off its performance materials division, increasing investment value for Cookson shareholders by over 25%.

By 2016, Cevian had $13 billion in assets under management. This increased to about $15.5 billion in AUM the following year.

=== Investment activity ===
On 16 December 2018 ABB relented to pressure from Cevian and agreed to sell its poorly-performing Power Grids unit.

In December 2017 Cevian sold its entire shares (8.2%) in AB Volvo to the Chinese Volvo Cars owner Geely. Cevian thus achieved a profit of more than two billion euros.

In December 2023, the firm acquired a 1.3% investment in UBS worth £1 billion.

== Investment method ==
The firm invests only in Europe, although 70% of its capital comes from North America. It does not short stocks, use leverage, write open letters, or engage in proxy fights, and it believes in long-term investments. At first its investments were confined to Scandinavia; more recently, according to Zimmerman, the firm's investment focus has been "on the Nordics, UK, Germany and Switzerland," because these countries "have a combination of the clearest governance rules in favor of shareholders, good transparency as well as interesting companies." Cevian has not invested in southern or Central Europe, Zimmerman has said, "because we don't know those environments, and we don't have relationships there, and we can't be certain that the rules, formal and informal rules, are ones that we'll be comfortable with." Gardell has also stated that he and his colleagues need "to know the people, have networks, have a corporate governance tradition we're comfortable with" in order to make an investment.
