= Investment AB Öresund =

Swedish investment company

- Type: Public (Nasdaq Stockholm: ORES)
- Industry: Investment
- Founded: 1961; 65 years ago
- Headquarters: Stockholm, Sweden
- Key people: Sven Hagströmer, Chairman; Mats Qviberg, CEO
- Website: www.oresund.se

Investment AB Öresund is a Swedish investment company. In 2012, the company split into two entities: Investment AB Öresund, controlled by Mats Qviberg, and Creades, controlled by Sven Hagströmer. Larger holdings in 2018 were Fabege, Bilia, Scandi Standard and Catena Media.

== History ==
The original company was founded in 1890 as Sjöförsäkringsaktiebolaget Öresund. In 1956 the company was reorganised and AB Sjö-Öresund became the main company in a group of insurance companies. In 1961 these subsidiaries were sold to Skandia. Skandia paid in cash and in shares. Thus, the company became an investment company and was renamed Investment AB Öresund. It was listed on the stock exchange in 1962.

== Under Hagströmer and Qviberg ==
In 1993, Öresund was taken over by Sven Hagströmer and Mats Qviberg. They had started building a group of companies around Hagströmer & Qviberg. Öresund became their weapon in an assault on a number of Swedish companies, including AB Custos. Many more traditionalist Swedish businessmen were upset by the success of the two businessmen. Percy Barnevik was on the board of directors of Custos at the time when Öresund started acquiring shares, and he was bitterly upset with their actions.

== Listed holdings ==
Öresund's largest holdings are real estate company Fabege (previously known as Wihlborgs, 16% of Öresund's portfolio), Nobia and major Volvo retailer Bilia (both 10%). Other large holdings include shares of Investor AB (5%), Alfa Laval (3%) and of course Hagströmer & Qviberg (5%).

In total the company controls almost 8 billion krona worth of stock.

== Organisation and ownership ==
Sven Hagströmer is the chairman and largest shareholder with 18% of the shares. Meanwhile, Qviberg is chief executive officer and owns 13% of Öresund. Despite its name, alluding to the Öresund Region, the company is based in Stockholm.
