= Shareholder activism =

Shareholder using equity to pressure management

Shareholder activism is a form of activism in which shareholders use equity stakes in a corporation to put pressure on its management. A fairly small stake (less than 10% of outstanding shares) may be enough to launch a successful campaign. In comparison, a full takeover bid is a much more costly and difficult undertaking. The goals of shareholder activism range from financial (increase of shareholder value through changes in corporate policy, cost cutting, etc.) to non-financial (disinvestment from particular countries, etc.). Shareholder activists can address self-dealing by corporate insiders, although large stockholders can also engage in self-dealing to themselves at the expense of smaller minority shareholders.

Shareholder activism can take any of several forms: proxy battles, publicity campaigns, shareholder resolutions, litigation, and negotiations with management. Daniel Loeb, head of Third Point Management, is notable for his use of sharply written letters directed towards the CEOs of his target companies.

Activism may help to address the principal-agent problem where the agents (management) do not adequately respond to the wishes of the principals (investors) of publicly traded companies. In the 2010s, investments in the activist asset class grew, with activists receiving coverage by the media and positive attention from investors. Activists in some cases been able to acquire board seats with a formal proxy context.

Shareholder activists are influencing mergers and acquisitions. A 2015 survey of corporate development leaders found that 60% of respondents saw shareholder activism affecting transaction activity in their industry. Increasingly, non-financial forms of shareholder activism affect companies in a range of sectors. Shareholders, often with a comparatively small stake in a company, often seek to influence the company's environmental and social performance. Other forms of activist campaigns include influencing divestitures, with results from Fortune 500 companies, between 2007 and 2015, suggesting these are often more successful in terms of increasing shareholder value than management led divestitures.

According to Lazard’s H1 2026 Review of Shareholder Activism, 184 new activist campaigns launched globally in the first half of 2026, the busiest six-month period on record.

== History ==
Corporations in 18th-century Europe were relatively uncommon, but in the United States they were more prevalent, starting with 300 in the 1790s and expanding by around 26,000 between 1790 and the 1860s, resulting in about 15 times the corporations in Great Britain by 1830. These early corporations contained provisions for corporate governance, including restricted charters, bylaws, prudent-mean voting rules, dividend payments, and press coverage.

Between 1900 and 1950, about 1.22 "offensive" activist initiatives occurred per year, with more occurring in the 1940s and 1950s. Notable investors included Cyrus S. Eaton, Phoenix Securities Corporation, Benjamin Graham, J. Paul Getty, and Malcolm Chace. Activism was likely limited by the lack of ownership dispersion, meaning that many corporations had large shareholders with sizable blocks (10 to 20% of total shares) who already exerted significant control over the corporation.

Shareholder activism has evolved from the "corporate raider" tactics of the 1980s to the more sophisticated approaches employed by contemporary hedge funds. These funds often adapt their strategies to different regulatory and business environments. The practice has expanded globally, with activist tactics shaped by ownership structures in the United States, the United Kingdom, and continental Europe, particularly in companies with controlling stakeholders. Modern campaigns frequently involve private negotiations with management, media engagement, and alliances with institutional investors. Coalition building has become an increasingly important element of activist strategy, allowing participants to amplify influence while addressing both short-term financial objectives and longer-term corporate value .

By the 2010s shareholder activism which predominantly occurred in places such as the US and Europe began to expand into Asia and quickly surpassed the amount of activism occurring in Europe.

== Notable investors and funds ==
Notable activist investors include: Isaac Le Maire (1558–1624), Carl Icahn, Nelson Peltz (Trian Partners), Bill Ackman (Pershing Square), Daniel Loeb (Third Point Management), Barry Rosenstein, Larry Robbins (Glenview), David Einhorn, Gregg Hymowitz (EnTrust Global), Larry Fink (BlackRock), Christer Gardell (Cevian Capital), and Ryan Cohen.

During the 1980s, activist investors such as Carl Icahn and T. Boone Pickens gained international notoriety and were often perceived as "corporate raiders" for acquiring an equity stake in publicly owned companies and then forcing them to take action to improve value or rid themselves of activist investors by buying back the raider's investment at a premium, often at the expense of other shareholders. More recently, activist investor Phillip Goldstein suggested that the role of the activist investor has moved from green mail to one of being a catalyst to unlock value in an underlying security, and says that the public perception of activist investors as "corporate raiders" has dissipated.

Activist investment funds include: California Public Employees' Retirement System (CalPERS), Icahn Management LP, Santa Monica Partners Opportunity Fund LP, State Board of Administration of Florida (SBA), and Relational Investors, LLC.

In 2019 and beyond, notable activist investors included Starboard Value, Icahn Enterprises, Elliott Investment Management, and Third Point. In 2019, mutual funds such as Wellington Management Company began to show signs of activism. A prominent campaign by hedge fund Engine No. 1 resulted in them winning three seats on Exxon's board in 2021, with the objective of influencing the company to reduce its reliance on fossil fuels.

Examples of activist investors in Asia include Oasis Management, David Webb, and Yoshiaki Murakami.

=== Outreach strategies ===
Aside from nominating a slate of directors, the most frequently used activist tactics are publicity campaigns. These commonly include the public release of presentations or letters addressed to the company, the issuance of press releases, the creation of dedicated websites, and the use of social media platforms such as Twitter. Other methods, such as initiating litigation or calling a special meeting, are employed far less often.

=== Funding ===
Activist investors are often hedge funds funded by accredited investors and institutions. In 2019, institutions were demanding more upfront explanation of the activist ideas before funding, and in some cases requiring that the funds be placed into special purpose vehicles specifically for the project. Activist hedge funds, which are hedge funds that "take concentrated positions in the equity of public corporations and actively engage with corporate managers" can address the principal-agent problem and limit self-dealing by providing management with high-powered incentives to increase value.

== Offensive versus defensive ==
Shareholder activism can be categorized as "offensive" or "defensive"; in the latter case, an existing shareholder attempts to correct some deficiency, while offensive activists build a position with the intention to agitate for change. Shareholders can also initiate a derivative suit to force action by the corporation. Shareholders can also engage in a securities class action but these are typically not associated with activism.

== Laws ==
In the United States, the acquisition of over 5% of beneficial ownership in a company with the intention to influence leadership must be accompanied by a Schedule 13D filing with the Securities and Exchange Commission (SEC). Investors who do not intend to become activists may file a Schedule 13G instead.

=== Proxy access ===
Historically, investors were required to mail separate ballots when trying to nominate someone of their own to the board, but beginning in 2015, proxy access rules began to spread (driven by initiatives from major institutional investors) and as of 2018, 71% of S&P 500 companies had a proxy access rule.

=== Voting ===
Votes for the board may be "straight" or "cumulative". In straight voting (aka statutory voting), shareholders get one vote per share on all ballot questions (e.g., candidates for the board of directors or shareholder proposals). In cumulative voting, a shareholder receives a general vote for however many number of ballot questions there are. The votes can then be all cast for (or against) a single ballot question, which makes it easier for minority shareholders to elect candidates. There has also been a movement toward "majority" voting, where a candidate must receive the majority of votes. Most large corporations are incorporated in Delaware due to the well-developed Delaware General Corporation Law; in Delaware, cumulative voting is optional, but exceptions exist; for example, a California-based but Delaware-registered corporation may be "pseudo-foreign" under California law and therefore have to comply with California law.

== Performance ==
Taking an activist approach to public investing may produce returns in excess of those likely to be achieved passively. A 2012 study by Activist Insight showed that the mean annual net return of over 40 activist-focused hedge funds had consistently outperformed the MSCI world index in the years after the 2008 financial crisis. Activist investing was the top-performing strategy among hedge funds in 2013, with such firms returning, on average, 16.6% while other hedge funds returned 9.5%.

== Research and statistics ==
A 1996 study found that firm size and institutional ownership were positively related to the likelihood of being targeted by activist investors. Researchers also try to understand what makes company a desirable target for an activist investor. Since the late 2010s scholars and practitioners have started using machine learning methodologies to predict both targets and activists.

As of 2018, an average of 272 activist campaigns were initiated annually over the previous five years in the United States, including 47 proxy contests. The trend has also been global in scope; approximately 47% of companies targeted by activist investors during this period were located outside the United States, with Europe and Asia seeing increases in the CAGR of such campaigns of over 40%, between 2016 and 2020, companies in Australia, Argentina, Brazil and Canada seeing increases of over 20%, compared to activist campaigns in the US increasing by 3%.

When the COVID-19 pandemic reached the United States, shareholder activism campaigns in the U.S. declined by approximately 30 percent between January and August 2020, compared with the same period in 2019. A report by Sullivan & Cromwell stated that industry commentators had incorrectly predicted that the resulting market volatility from the pandemic would trigger a sharp increase in shareholder activism, but the opposite happened.

In H1 2025, the business sectors that experienced the highest volume of shareholder activism campaigns globally were industrials (22%), technology (20%) and healthcare (12%), with industrials most targeted in APAC, technology most targeted in the US and the healthcare sector most targeted in Europe.

In the first half of 2026, 184 new activist campaigns were launched globally (a 20% increase year-over-year and 38% above the five-year H1 average) marking the busiest six-month period on record. North America recorded 94 campaigns (a new high, up 19% year-over-year and driven by a 24% rise in the United States); APAC saw 65 campaigns (more than double the historical average), including a record 52 in Japan (up 53%); while Europe moderated to 23 campaigns (down 23%), with activity concentrated in the United Kingdom (57%) and Italy (17%).

A mid-2026 analysis of U.S. campaigns against large companies (defined as having market capitalizations of at least $300 million) found that activists launched 84 campaigns between 1 January and 1 June 2026, a 12% increase from the 75 campaigns in the corresponding period of 2025. M&A-related demands appeared in 39 of these campaigns (more than double the prior-year figure) and became the most common agenda item, ahead of governance reform. Activists obtained 25 board seats at 15 companies (down from 31 seats at 19 companies a year earlier), with a campaign success rate of roughly 17% (versus 27%, previously); nearly all seats were secured through settlements. Hedge funds accounted for 68% of campaigns.

== Retail involvement ==
Under U.S. securities law, any shareholder (including individual retail investors) may submit a shareholder proposal for consideration at a public company’s annual meeting. From 1934 until the mid-1980s, many shareholder proposals were filed by individual investors rather than institutional shareholders. One estimate placed institutional owners at 68% of shares and retail at 32% of shares, but 98% of institutional owners vote and only 28% of retail owners vote. Institutional shareholders, however, often vote automatically upon the advice of proxy advisory firms; allowing retail shareholders to vote based upon a guideline ("standing voting instructions") has been proposed to increase their involvement.

Several websites were created to facilitate retail shareholder involvement in proxy voting, including Moxy Vote, Shareowners.org, United States Proxy Exchange and ProxyDemocracy.org. Most of these platforms have since shut down.

== Political and labor involvement ==
Labor unions, including through pension funds such as CalPERS coalitions such as the Strategic Organizing Center often engage in shareholder proposals. The Shareholder Rights Group is a coalition of shareholder proposal advocates.

Labor union pension funds shifted their focus toward executive compensation during the late 1990s and early 2000s. Before this shift, public pension funds such as CalPERS led most institutional shareholder activism, focusing primarily on board structure and anti-takeover defenses.

=== Socially responsible investing ===
Organizations such as the Interfaith Center on Corporate Responsibility (ICCR), As You Sow and Ceres use shareholder proposals and investor engagement to press companies on environmental, sustainability and human-rights issues.

== See also ==
- Board of directors
- Corporate governance
- Corporate raid
- Corporate social responsibility
- Passive investor
- Proxy statement
- Shareholder rebellion
- Socially responsible investing
