= District Vision =

American running brand

- Industry: Eyewear and Sports Gear
- Founded: 2016
- Founder: Tom Daly and Max Vallot
- Headquarters: Los Angeles, US
- Website: https://www.districtvision.com

District Vision is a running brand and wellness collective, based in Los Angeles.

== History ==
District Vision was founded by Tom Daly and Max Vallot in 2016. The company initially sold two frames; Keiichi and Nagata. In 2017, the company introduced three additional frames; Kaishiro Explorer, Nako Multisport and Yukari Windshield. The frames were manufactured out of nylon and titanium and sold in 4 lens variations; Sky G15 (full UV protection), Sports Yellow (for visibility in low light), Water Gray (polarized lenses to minimize glare from water) and Black Rose (changing light conditions).

The lenses are Polycarbonate and block UV rays. They act as resistant from impact, shatter and scratch. The company distributes products through Dover Street Market in New York, and Barneys New York.

District Vision also introduced a holistic tool kit for runners besides their signature eyewear, including a performance sock line in collaboration with Falke. They work with athletes of all backgrounds and organise the Mindful Athlete program for Marathon participants.

=== Founders ===

Daly and Vallot met at a business school in London, after which Vallot worked for Saint Laurent and Daly for Acne Studios. Through their Mindful Athlete Program, they collaborate with athletes and running clubs around the world to promote mental health.

== Awards ==
- Gear Patrol 100: District Vision was selected as one of the best 100 products in 2016.
- Runner's World Editor's Choice Award: Kaishiro as best new running sunglasses in 2017.
