= Avanza =

Swedish online bank

Avanza Bank Holding AB

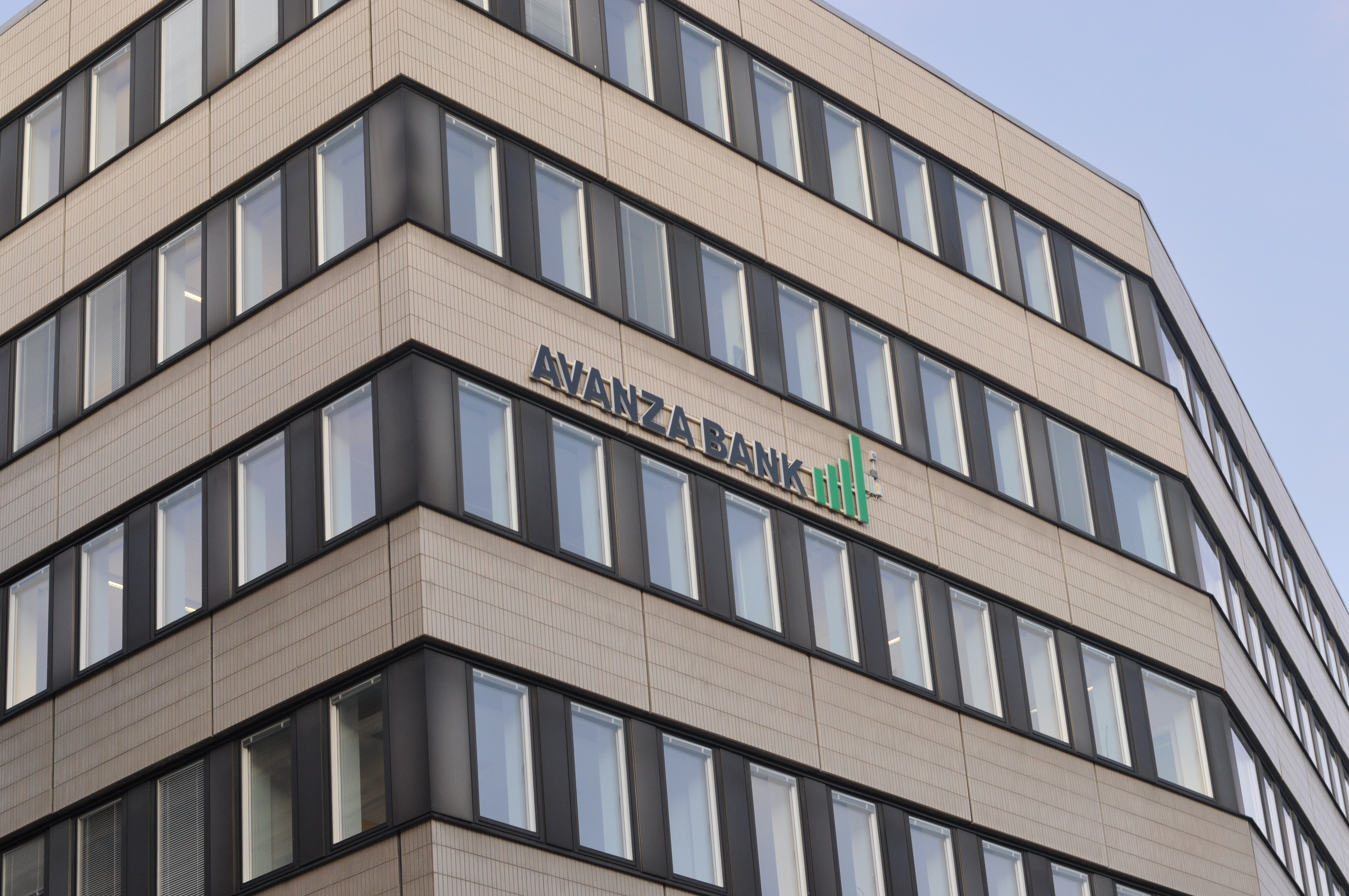
- The company's headquarters on Regeringsgatan in Stockholm, 2012
- Trade name: Avanza
- Type: Public
- Traded as: Nasdaq Stockholm: AZA
- ISIN: SE0012454072
- Industry: Financial services
- Founded: 1999; 27 years ago
- Founder: Sven Hagströmer
- Headquarters: Stockholm, Sweden
- Area served: Sweden
- Key people: Sven Hagströmer (chairman); Gustaf Unger (CEO)
- Products: Savings accounts, mortgage loans, insurance, pensions
- Services: Stockbroker, corporate finance
- Owner: Creades AB (10.1%); Sven Hagströmer (10.1%)
- Number of employees: 635 (2022)
- Subsidiaries: Avanza Fonder; Avanza Pension; Placera Media
- Website: avanza.se

Avanza Bank Holding AB is a Swedish online bank based in Stockholm, specializing in savings, investments and pensions. As of October 2026, Avanza had approximately 2.4 million customers and SEK 1.26 trillion in customer savings capital, according to its monthly operating statistics. The company reported 2,405,200 customers at the end of October, compared with 2,223,500 a year earlier.

== History ==
Avanza was founded in 1999 as HQ.se.

In 2001, HQ.se acquired Avanza and changed its name to Avanza, which became the largest stockbroker in Sweden, with 80,000 active customers.

In 2006, Avanza acquired stock magazine Börsveckan and launched Placera, a free online newspaper. Placera is focused on equities, funds and savings. The two are editorially independent and are grouped under Placera Media, a wholly owned subsidiary of Avanza.

In the same year, Avanza established its wholly owned fund management subsidiary, Avanza Fonder, and introduced its first product, Avanza Zero, a zero-fee index fund tracking the OMX Stockholm 30 index.

In 2018, Avanza Fonder launched the cheapest global fund in the world, Avanza Global, with an annual management fee of 0.05%.

As of 17 September 2025, Avanza offers digital trading in about 100 London Stock Exchange–listed companies, priced in pounds sterling with a £1 minimum commission, and plans GBP currency accounts so Private Banking and Pro clients can hold balances and avoid per-trade FX fees. Earlier in 2025 it added digital trading in Spain and Switzerland.

In December 2024, Avanza announced an agreement to acquire Swedish financial technology company Sigmastocks for SEK 21.1 million. The acquisition was intended to support the development of digital discretionary portfolio management services, particularly for private banking customers. The transaction was completed on 1 July 2025, when Sigmastocks AB and Sigmastocks Neo AB became part of the Avanza Group.

On 31 August 2026, Avanza launched Avanza Sigma, a digital investment management service developed following the Sigmastocks acquisition. The service uses algorithm-based portfolio management and factor investing strategies to construct equity portfolios according to customers' investment preferences. Its introduction marked Avanza's expansion into discretionary portfolio management, initially targeting its Private Banking and Pro customer segments.

== Operations and services ==
Avanza operates a digital savings and investment platform in Sweden, providing services to retail investors, professional investors and corporate customers. Its products include trading in Swedish and international equities, investment funds, savings accounts, securities-backed lending and mortgage loans. The company also offers investment services for high-net-worth individuals through its Private Banking division and for active investors through its Pro customer segment.

Avanza's pension and insurance operations include occupational pension plans and insurance-based investment accounts. Its fund management subsidiary, Avanza Fonder, manages the company's own investment funds, including Avanza Zero, an index fund introduced in 2006.The group's banking and insurance businesses are subject to supervision by the Swedish Financial Supervisory Authority (Finansinspektionen).

In August 2026, Avanza introduced Avanza Sigma, an algorithm-driven discretionary portfolio management service developed following its acquisition of Sigmastocks. The service uses factor-based investment strategies to construct and manage equity portfolios according to customers' selected investment preferences. Initially offered to Private Banking and Pro customers, the service marked the group's expansion into discretionary asset management.

== Corporate structure ==
Avanza Bank Holding AB (publ), headquartered in Stockholm, is the publicly listed parent company of the Avanza Group. The group's operations are conducted in Sweden through wholly owned subsidiaries specializing in banking, insurance, fund management and financial media.

The group's principal operating subsidiaries are:

- Avanza Bank AB – provides banking, securities trading, savings accounts and lending services.
- Försäkringsaktiebolaget Avanza Pension – offers pension and insurance-based savings products.
- Avanza Fonder AB – manages investment funds offered under the Avanza brand.
- Placera Media Stockholm AB – operates the financial news and information website Placera, which maintains editorial independence from the group's other operations.

The group also includes Avanza Förvaltning AB, which administers warrants relating to employee incentive programmes. Sigmastocks AB and Sigmastocks Neo AB became wholly owned subsidiaries following their acquisition in July 2025.

== See also ==
- List of banks in Sweden
