= AB Custos =

Swedish investment company (founded 2004)

AB Custos is a Swedish investment company. In 2004, it came under the control of investors Mats Qviberg and Sven Hagströmer and was merged with their investment company Investment AB Öresund, before being subsequently demerged. The largest shareholder was the chairman, Jonas Wahlström. The firm was rebooted in 2008 and has since acquired several companies, including Metro International in 2017 and Realtid.se.

== History ==
The Kreuger crash of 1932 resulted in several banks experiencing serious liquidity problems. This led to a change in legislation whereby the Swedish commercial banks lost their right to acquire shares from the turn of the year 1933/1934. This prohibitive legislation also meant that previously acquired shares held by the banks had to be sold by December 31, 1937, with the exception of shares that could not be sold at a loss. The Kreuger group's large bank loans now meant that large shareholdings in the former financial empire ended up in the hands of the banks. Many banks felt compelled by the new legislation to sell off their shareholdings as soon as possible. The larger banks, on the other hand, chose to transfer the shares to newly formed holding or management companies, which were close to the banks in terms of management. Skandinaviska Kredit (Skandinaviska Banken), which among other things had become the main owner of the real estate company Hufvudstaden founded by Kreuger, solved the problem before the deadline by forming the investment company AB Custos on 13 March 1937. Custos is Latin for "guardian" or "protector".

Custos has had a significant number of shares in companies like Volvo and Skandinaviska Enskilda Banken. It was at its peak of financial power in the 1980s.

In the 1990s, Sven Hagströmer and Mats Qviberg took over Custos with Investment AB Öresund; Custos' holdings were gradually sold off and the companies were eventually merged in 2004, though the process had been initiated years earlier.

== CEOs ==
- 1996 to 2001: Christer Gardell
- 2001 to 2004: Mikael Nachemson
- ? to Present: Christen Eugen Ager–Hanssen
