= Jonny Johansson =

Swedish fashion director

Jonny Johansson is the creative director and co-founder of Acne Studios, the Stockholm-based multidisciplinary fashion house.

== Early life ==
Johansson grew up in the north of Sweden and was originally a guitarist in several rock bands in his youth.

== Career ==
In 2002, Jonny and three colleagues founded the ACNE creative collective. ACNE stands for Ambition to Create Novel Expression, but Johansson has also expressed that he liked the idea of ‘appropriating a difficult word’ and making it cool. In 1997, the Acne Studios fashion line was born when Johansson created 100 pairs of raw denim jeans with red stitching and gave them away to friends and family.

Johansson has stated that the early inspiration for Acne Studios came from the Warhol Factory. Johansson is heavily influenced by art, design, literature and music and over the years he has collaborated with a diverse range of artists, photographers and designers such as Lanvin, Lord Snowdon and transsexual magazine Candy. His characteristic style is an emphasis on tailoring and the use of eclectic materials and custom fabrics.
