= Oasis Management =

Hong Kong investment firm

Oasis Management Company Ltd.
- Formerly: DKR Oasis Management Company LP
- Type: Private
- Industry: Investment management
- Founded: January 2002 (24 years ago)
- Founder: Seth Fischer
- Headquarters: LHT Tower, Hong Kong
- AUM: US$14 billion (2026)
- Number of employees: 43 (2023)
- Website: oasiscm.com

Oasis Management Company (Oasis), is a hedge fund management firm headquartered in Hong Kong with additional offices in Tokyo and Austin, Texas. It is an activist investor, that has pushed for significant change at companies. In recent times, it has been focusing on Japanese firms.

== Background ==
Oasis was founded in 2002 by Seth Fischer who previously was an Asian investment portfolio manager at Highbridge Capital Management. It was originally formed as a venture between Oasis Management Holdings and DKR Capital Partners named DKR Oasis Management. It ran an Asia-focused multi-strategy fund named DKR SoundShore Oasis Fund.

In December 2008, due to the 2008 financial crisis, DKR Oasis laid off staff in its Tokyo office.

In June 2011, the venture dissolved with outside money being returned. DKR Oasis Management was restructured into Oasis Management .

In September 2011, the Securities and Futures Commission (SFC) publicly reprimanded and fined both Oasis and Fischer HK$7.5 million ($961,767) each for trades done in 2006 relating to Japan Airlines shares. SFC alleged that Oasis placed several orders on the Tokyo Stock Exchange for Japan Airlines shares within 15 minutes of the market closing on 19 July 2006 after Japan Airlines announced a plan for a public sale of new shares. The trades appeared intended to drive down the closing price of Japan Airlines shares that day which would benefit Oasis funds during purchases of new shares in the offering. While Oasis and Fischer didn't admit trading strategy was designed to mislead the market, they agreed to accept SFC sanctions and took voluntary measures in 2007 to prevent similar events reoccurring.

Following the passing of Oasis employee Karen Leung, Fischer founded the Karen Leung Foundation in 2013 for research and prevention of gynecological cancers in Hong Kong.

In May 2023, Fischer was a speaker at the Sohn Hong Kong hedge fund summit. He stated that concerns about China being uninvestable were overblown and that there were opportunities to be made investing in Chinese vocational education companies.

== Shareholder activism ==
In February 2014, Fischer sent a letter to Nintendo President Satoru Iwata which stated that the company should focus on the mobile game market. In July 2016, it was reported that Oasis stood to make tens of millions after the success of Pokémon Go.

In November 2015, Oasis called for Kyocera to pay back more than $4 billion to investors. The plan was for Kyocera to sell its $8.3 billion stake in KDDI and to give half the proceeds to shareholders.

In February 2017, Oasis opposed Panasonic's plan to acquire its subsidiary PanaHome stating the price was too low. In April 2017, Panasonic raised its offer to satisfy Oasis and other shareholders.

In November 2017, Oasis proposed a management buyout as well as a request to examine the books and records of Pasona.

In 2018, Oasis was opposed to Alps Electric acquiring Alpine Electronics stating it was ripping off Alpine's minority stock owners. However Elliott Management which held more shares supported the deal. In January 2019, the deal went through and Alps Alpine was formed. In March 2019, Alps Alpine stated that Oasis sued it for 38.4 billion yen ($345 million) in damages and had asked the Tokyo District Court to nullify the merger. In March 2022, the court sided in favour of Alps Alpine.

In October 2020, Oasis submitted a request to Tokyo Dome Corp to hold an extraordinary general meeting to replace its top management. In November 2020, Mitsui Fudosan announced a 120.5 billion yen ($1.2 billion) bid for Tokyo Dome Corp. After the offer, Oasis decided to tender its shares allowing the bid to be completed in January 2021.

In April 2021, Oasis opposed CVC Capital Partners’ buyout proposal for Toshiba stating it was too low. In March 2022, Oasis voted at an extraordinary general meeting that Toshiba solicit buyout offers from private equity firms. It also voted against Toshiba plan to break itself up. In March 2023 Toshiba agreed to be acquired for US$15 billion by a consortium of 20 companies, which was led by Japan Industrial Partners and included Orix, Chubu Electric Power, and Rohm.

In May 2022, Oasis published details which alleged the Fujitec's founding family Uchiyama was abusing its control over the company. It later then called for an extraordinary general meeting to replace all of the company's outside directors. In February 2023, Fujitec shareholders voted to replace three of the company's outside directors with four people nominated by Oasis. In March 2023, the board ousted Fujitec Chairman Takakazu Uchiyama.

In February 2023, Oasis made demands to The Restaurant Group that it changes its management team. In the subsequent months it increased its shareholding as the share price dropped by acquiring shares from Odey Asset Management and Columbia Threadneedle Investments. In October 2023, when Apollo Global Management made a bid to buy The Restaurant Group for £560 million, Oasis stood to make £40mn in profits.

In March 2024, it was reported that Oasis had built up an ownership stake of Greencore which was just under 5%. Oasis was frustrated with Greencore not paying out a dividend since 2020 and was speculated to acquire more shares so it could enact changes at the company.

In April 2024, Oasis announced that it held 3% of Kao Corporation and laid out a proposal to increase the share price by 76% to 97% by streamlining and focusing on overseas marketing.

In July 2024, Oasis filed a 7.2 billion yen ($45.21 million) lawsuit against Japanese drugstore Kusuri No Aoki's president and vice president, alleging that Aoki issued stock options to both men in 2020 at far below their value. Oasis owns 9.7% of the company's shares.

Oasis holds 8.6% of DIC Corporation as of October 2024. DIC maintains an art collection, displayed at Kawamura Memorial DIC Museum of Art. Oasis founder Fischer has commented negatively about the fact that the company maintains the museum and the collection.

In November 2024, it was reported that Oasis Management had acquired a stake in Japanese automobile manufacturer Nissan, although the size of the purchase was not known.

In March 2026, Oasis acquired a 8.86% stake in Kadokawa Corporation, the parent company of FromSoftware. In June 2026, it was reported that Oasis held a 13.76% stake of Kadokawa and was involved in a dispute over its direction where it argued for it to be optimized to make more money. Their stake in Kadokawa increased to 15.25% later that month, while Oasis Management has pushed to remove Kadokawa's CEO Takeshi Natsuno.
