= Mikael Schiller =

Swedish businessman

Mikael Schiller is the chairman and co-owner of Acne Studios, the Stockholm-based multidisciplinary fashion house.

Schiller joined the company in 2001 while studying for a master's degree from Stockholm School of Economics. Shortly after helping the company to write an investment memorandum, Schiller was asked to become the managing director.

Prior to Acne Studios, Schiller worked as a fireworks entrepreneur, psychology teacher and investment manager. Schiller was on the board of Finnish furniture group Artek between 2010 and 2013.
