= Acne Paper =

Culture magazine based in Stockholm, Sweden

- Winter 2011 cover with Leigh Bowery
- Editor-in-Chief: Thomas Persson
- Frequency: Biannual
- Publisher: Acne Studios
- Founder: Jonny Johansson
- Founded: 2005
- Final issue Number: 2023 #18
- Country: Sweden
- Based in: Stockholm
- Website: acnepaper.com
- ISSN: 2000-0707
- OCLC: 243941041

Founded in 2005, Acne Paper is a bi-annual culture magazine and the publishing arm of the Stockholm-based creative collective and fashion label Acne Studios (Ambition to Create Novel Expression). Originally published between 2005 and 2014, the magazine returned in 2021.

== History and profile ==
The founder and editor at large of Acne Paper was Jonny Johansson. The headquarters of the magazine was in Stockholm, and it had an office in Paris.

Aiming to merge the historical with the contemporary, each issue of Acne Paper evolved around a key theme with the purpose of representing all creative practices in the context of history, philosophy, science, journalism, and other academia. Textual content consisted of interviews, prose, poems, and essays that together with fashion editorial, visual portfolios, and artwork formulates its approach to the creative industry and its cultural voice and expression. By creating a high-profile publishing product in an A3 ISO 216 format, Acne Paper was part of revolutionizing brand communication as Acne does not advertise or market itself in traditional fashion media such as editorial campaigns.

The New York Times’ Cathy Horyn writes “Acne Paper, under the editorship of Thomas Persson, is fast becoming one of the best little fashion magazines ... the envy of mainstream glossies". As well as "The appeal of Acne Paper was the unfettered blend of the new and the nostalgic, except it doesn’t feel like nostalgia in this context. Maybe it just feels free". Eric Wilson, also of The New York Times writes “Acne Paper, has also become a cult hit, like Andy Warhol's Interview in the early days, for its insider perspective on the most obscure corners of fashion and its wealth of big-name contributors". Susannah Frankel of The Independent writes "There is an organic and authentic quality to Acne Paper, a sense of it extending above and beyond an obviously commercially viable concern, which is genuinely inspiring.".

In 2006 Acne Paper was exhibited at the Visionaire Gallery in New York as part of their MEGAZINES exhibition. In 2008 Acne Paper No 4 Playfulness won the D&AD award for Magazine and Newspaper Design – Entire Magazines, Magazine and Newspaper Design Front Cover, Typography – Magazine and Newspaper Design Homage as well as Photography – Magazine and Newspaper Design Homage.

The last issue of the original run of Acne Paper was #15 published in 2014.

In 2021, the magazine relaunched with a longer, 500-page format.

== Themes of issues ==
- No 1 The City
- No 2 Escapism
- No 3 Education
- No 4 Playfulness
- No 5 Elegance
- No 6 Exoticism
- No 7 Tradition
- No 8 Eroticism
- No 9 Art/Spirituality
- No 10 Legendary Parties
- No 11 The Artist's Studio
- No 12 Youth
- No 13 The Body
- No 14 Manhattan
- No 15 The Actress
- No 16 The Age of Aquarius
- No 17 Atticus
- No 18 House of Acne Paper
