= Mats Qviberg =

Swedish businessman (born 1953)

Mats Qviberg (born 1953) is a Swedish businessman. Together with his close business partner Sven Hagströmer, Qviberg is in control of a group of companies which include Hagströmer & Qviberg and Investment AB Öresund.

== Youth and Education ==
Mats Qviberg was born in central Stockholm. His father worked at a factory owned by General Motors. Qviberg went to school in Bromma outside the city centre and completed his military service in Strängnäs.

He graduated with a degree in business from Stockholm School of Economics.

== Early career ==
Qviberg started his career with Swedish bank SEB, where he became a stockbroker in 1981. He was incredibly successful and in 1984 he joined Carnegie Investment Bank, a major player on the Swedish financial markets.

== Hagströmer & Qviberg ==
In 1990, Qviberg became a partner in Hagströmer's company and it was renamed to reflect that. Together with Hagströmer, Qviberg built a financial empire beginning with the acquisition of Investment AB Öresund in 1992. Through partly unconventional methods many companies were taken over, sometimes upsetting traditionalist Swedish businessmen like Percy Barnevik. Barnevik served on the Board of Directors of AB Custos, an ancient investment company, which Qviberg and Hagströmer gradually took over.

Today, he control a number of companies. Qviberg is the Chairman of Öresund.

At the end of August 2010, it turned out that HQ Bank didn't have enough money to operate as a bank according to Swedish law, due to risky and failed speculation at the internal trading department at the bank. Sunday the 29th of August 2010, the Swedish "Finance Inspection" (FI, Finansinspektionen) withdrew their permission to operate as a bank. The bank was closed for several days after the 29th. According to Swedish media, approximately 900 customers had money on their accounts which exceeded the Swedish bank guarantee of 500,000 SEK. A report written by FI says that HQ Bank's department for risk control had a weak position at the bank.

== Political views ==
Qviberg has been known to make comments on current affairs. He has defined himself as allmänborgerlig, which means he is a supporter of Sweden's centre-right parties.

He caused some controversy during the campaign preceding the referendum on the Euro in 2003. He first came out in support of the Euro, even taking part in advertisements for Sweden in Europe. Meanwhile, Sven Hagströmer was an outspoken opponent of the euro. Close to the referendum, Qviberg changed his mind and joined the no side. When Prime Minister Göran Persson was asked to comment upon Qviberg's defection, Persson claimed that he did not know who Qviberg was. Qviberg replied by saying that Persson was a bully and that he was probably lying.

In early 2006, Qviberg drew attention to himself again by writing a series of articles in Svenska Dagbladet attacking the trend of corporate social responsibility and stated Ayn Rand as a major inspiration for his own ethics.

In late 2010, Qviberg again drew attention to himself after saying that he won't vote for the Christian Democrats (KD), which he claims to have done in the past. The reason for not voting on KD in the September 2010 election would, according to Mr Qviberg, be that the minister of the finance markets (who is a Christian Democrat) had made a statement that it was correct to withdraw the permission for HQ to operate as a bank.

== Personal ==
He lives with his wife in Lidingö. He is the second richest individual in that municipality. His son, Johan, sits on the Board of Directors of one of the companies which Qviberg is connected to. His other children are Anna and Jacob, Jacob being the youngest.
