= Acne Studios =

Swedish fashion house

Acne Studios AB

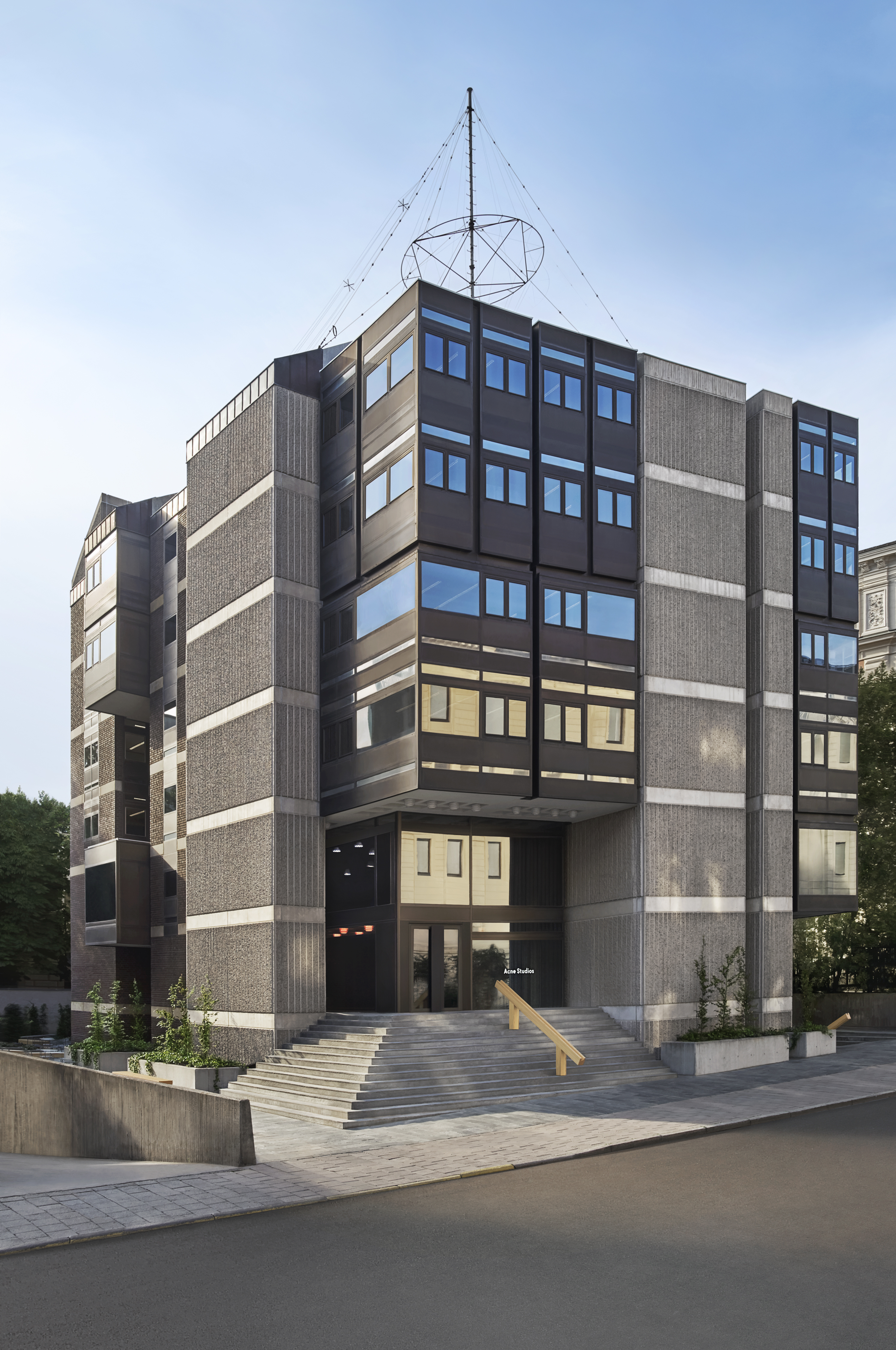
- Acne Studios Headquarters in Stockholm, Sweden
- Type: Private
- Industry: Fashion
- Founded: 1996; 30 years ago in Stockholm
- Founders: Jonny Johansson; Mats Johansson; Jesper Kouthoofd; Tomas Skoging
- Headquarters: Floragatan 13; 114 31 Stockholm; Sweden; 59.3429396°N 18.0753682°E
- Area served: Worldwide
- Key people: Mattias Magnusson (CEO); Mikael Schiller (executive chairman); Jonny Johansson (creative director); Hendrik Bitterschulte (CFO)
- Products: Ready-to-wear; shoes; accessories
- Website: acnestudios.com

Acne Studios is a multidisciplinary luxury fashion house based in Stockholm, Sweden, that specializes in men's and women's ready-to-wear fashion, footwear, accessories and denim. When founded in 1996, the label derived its name from the creative collective ACNE; initially an acronym for Associated Computer Nerd Enterprises and later a backronym of Ambition to Create Novel Expressions.

Founder and Creative Director Jonny Johannson's interest in photography, art, architecture and contemporary culture is reflected in the brand's clothing, publications, furniture, exhibitions and special collaborations.

== History ==
Acne Studios was founded in 1996 in Stockholm, Sweden as part of the creative collective ACNE that focused on graphic design, film, production and advertising. In 1997, cofounder Jonny Johansson created 100 pairs of raw denim jeans with red stitching and gave them away to friends and family. Wallpaper* and Vogue Paris quickly picked up on the popularity of the jeans and Acne Studios rapidly expanded their fashion offering outside of denim.

In 2006, Acne Studios became a standalone company and separated from other entities within the collective ACNE such as Acne Film, Acne Advertising and Acne Digital, at the same time launching their e-commerce operation. Since launching, Acne Studios has grown into a global fashion house with retail stores around the world including Paris, London, New York, Los Angeles, Antwerp and Tokyo, offering women's and men's ready-to-wear collections, showing at Paris Fashion Week twice a year and turning over $215 million annually in 2016. In December 2018, after rejecting earlier takeover offers (including from Kering), IDG Capital and I.T Group acquired stakes of 30.1% and 10.9% respectively, from the investment companies Creades, Öresund and PAN Capital. Jonny Johansson and the executive chairman Mikael Schiller remained as majority shareholders.

In 2019, the company moved its headquarters from Gamla stan (Lilla Nygatan 23) to Floragatan 13 (Granen 21) in Stockholm, the former Czechoslovak embassy building. Acne creative director Jonny Johansson and many other designers were involved in the redesign of the listed brutalist building, designed by Jan Bočan.

In the 2019/20 financial year, there were 60 Acne Studios boutiques worldwide, including several shops-in-shops in larger department stores, such as Galeries Lafayette and Shinsegae. The company supplies around 800 retailers and online retailers worldwide, employing over 700 people. Acne's annual sales amounted to 2.34 billion kroner, equivalent to over 200 million euros.

== Products ==
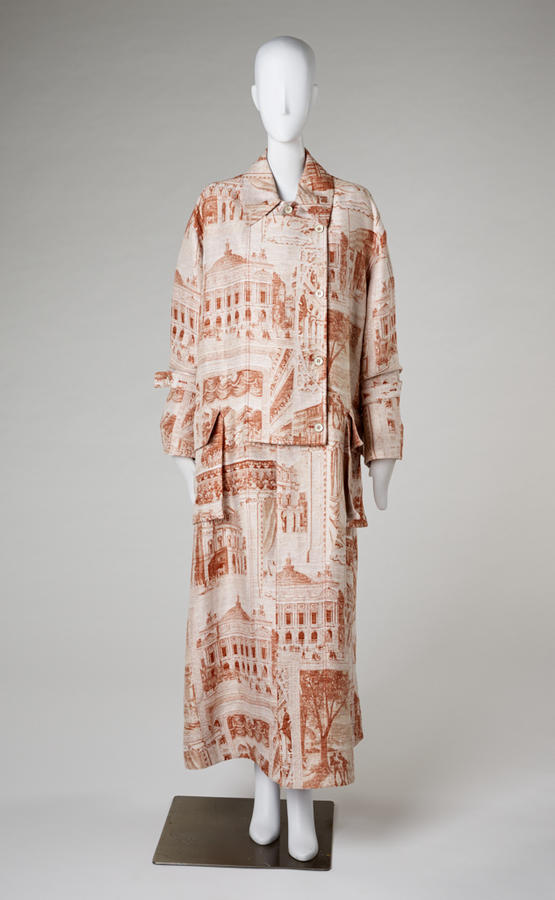
S/S 2019 design by Jonny Johansson

Acne Studios design men's and women's ready-to-wear fashion, footwear, denim, and accessories including handbags, small leather goods, and eyewear.

Acne Studios stages runway fashion shows for its women's Fall/Winter and Spring/Summer collections twice a year.

On 6 April 2017, Acne Studios relaunched its denim collection under the name Acne Studios Blå Konst (meaning "Blue Art" in Swedish) at all of their retail locations and on Acnestudios.com. This launch consists of men's and women's ready-to-wear, jeans, and accessories. In addition, an Acne Studios Blå Konst pop-up shop located in Tokyo's Shibuya district was opened to showcase the launch, which it houses exclusively. Six new denim styles including the North, River, and Land for men and the Climb, South, and Log for women have replaced the range of existing denim products. While these jean styles are permanent, the Blå Konst ready-to-wear collection will be updated seasonally.

On 17 August 2017, Acne Studios launched its Face motif collection, featuring patches of an emoticon face with two small circles and a long rectangle. Having first been introduced in their Autumn/Winter 2013 collection as a clutch, the face motif was featured in a unisex collection of ready-to-wear and accessories.

== Marketing ==
Acne Studios avoids traditional forms of marketing and advertising, choosing instead to publish a biannual magazine called Acne Paper. Acne Paper covers the disciplines of art, fashion, photography, design, architecture, academia, and culture. Each issue is based around a theme that is interpreted by selected contributors from their field of expertise. Contributors to Acne Paper have included Carine Roitfeld, Noam Chomsky, David Lynch, Lord Snowdon, Azzedine Alaïa, Mario Testino, Sarah Moon, Tilda Swinton and Paolo Roversi. The eighteenth issue was published in 2023. In 2021, a more comprehensive and longer issue was published under the name "Acne paper book".

=== Campaigns ===
In September 2016, Acne Studios announced its Fall/Winter 2016 campaign, shot by British photographer David Sims. The series was photographed in three parts, and each was presented globally- from posters plastered on the walls during Paris Fashion Week and Hong Kong's Golden week, on streetcars in Milan, and to digital images at London's Harrods.

For the Spring/Summer 2017 campaign, Paolo Roversi shot a portrait series featuring creatives around the world, such as Golshifteh Farahani, Fatima Al Qadiri, and Hayv Kahraman. The photography series was exhibited outdoors in New York, Paris, Milan, and Hong Kong.

For the introduction of Acne Studios Blå Konst, Collier Schorr shot the campaign featured on the homepage of AcneStudios.com. These photographs launched online along with the new products on 6 April 2017.

== Collaborations ==
Acne Studios has collaborated widely with representatives from the creative industries to produce limited edition collections. Some examples include a range of bikes with the world's oldest bike manufacturer Bianchi Bicycles, a furniture line of sofas based on Swedish designer Carl Malmsten’s sofa Nya Berlin, a capsule collection with couture house Lanvin, an art installation and a collection with artist Katerina Jebb, a cross-gender blouse collection with transsexual magazine Candy, an art book and blue shirt line with Lord Snowdon, limited edition prints with William Wegman, a rodeo-themed book and capsule collection inspired by Bruce of Los Angeles, a collection based around artworks by abstract Swedish pioneer Hilma af Klint, and a capsule collection with Liberty London.

More recent collaborations include a limited-edition monograph and unisex silk pajama collection with American sculptor Peter Schlesinger, small leather goods monogrammed with Jack Pierson's custom lettering, and a custom rug collection for Acne Studios' Madison Ave. location designed by British designer Max Lamb and Swedish rug company Kasthall.

In 2018, Acne Studios collaborated with another Sweden-based, outdoor gear and clothing company, Fjällräven, creating a clothing and accessories collection.

In 2019, Acne Studios released capsule clothing collections made in collaboration with Starter Black Label and with NBA player Russell Westbrook.

In 2020, Acne Studios released a capsule clothing collection featuring artwork from Monster in My Pocket.

== Publications ==
In 2012, Acne Studios and photographer Lord Snowdon collaborated to launch Acne Studios' first published book: Snowdon Blue. The publication included Snowdon's portraits of David Bowie, Serge Gainsbourg, Manolo Blahnik and more, all dressed in blue shirts. A limited-edition collection of 8 styles of blue button-ups alluding to the book's visuals were also created and sold both in-store and online. Acne Studios' second photography book, Bruce of Los Angeles: Rodeo, presents photographer Bruce Bellas' shots of American cowboys. In addition, Jonny Johannson designed a collection of western-themed tops, jeans, and boots to embody the classic American theme. Peter Schlesinger Sculpture was released by Acne Studios in conjunction with a capsule collection of silk loungewear on 29 April 2015. The book features photos of over 150 of American sculptor Peter Schlesinger's works since the 1980s, and was shot by Eric Boman. The monograph's photos were accompanied by Swedish text and printed on Japanese paper.

The Spring/Summer 2017 campaign, shot by Paolo Roversi, was also released as a limited-edition publication and featured interviews of those photographed.

== Stores ==
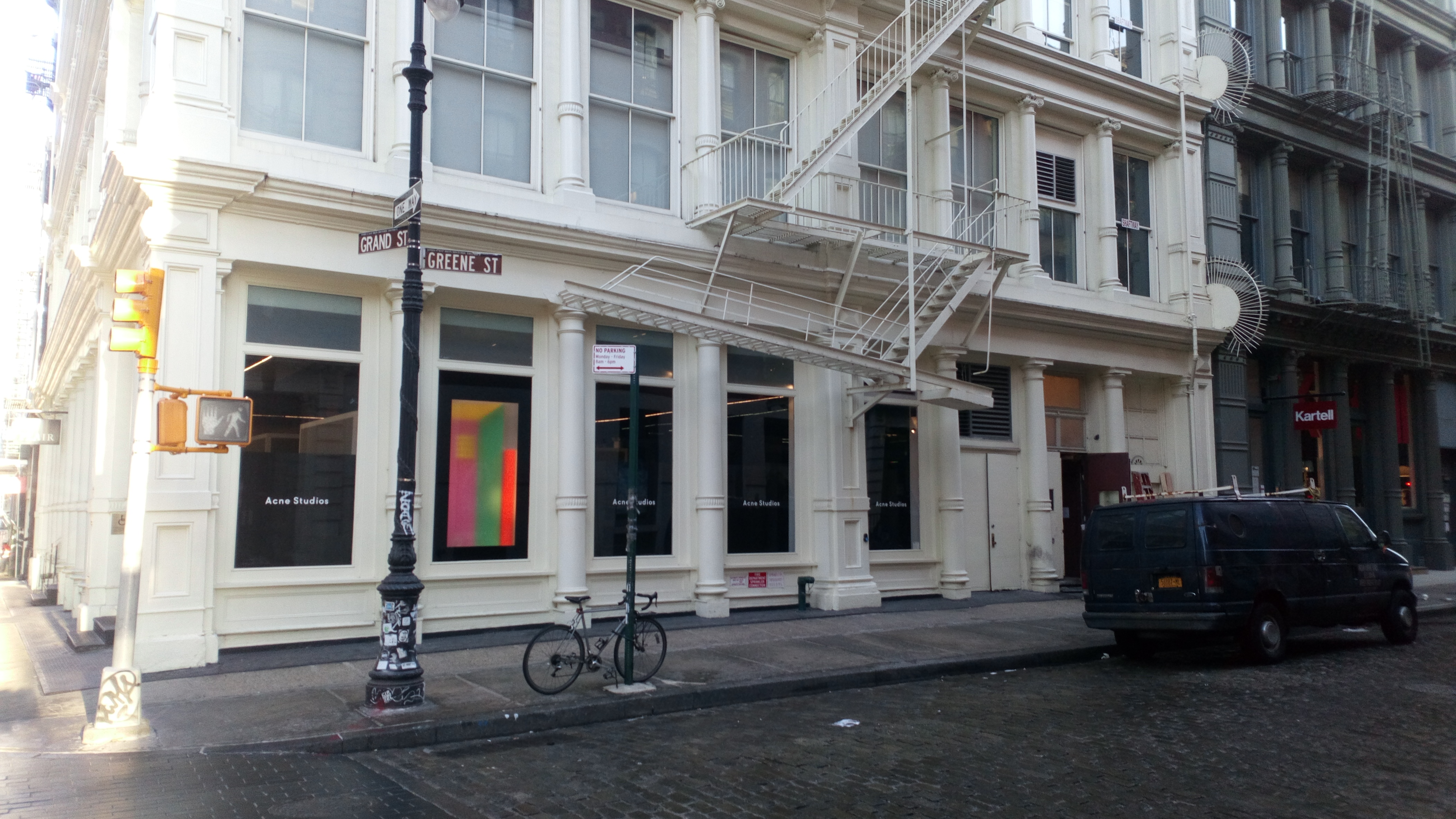
Acne Studios store in SoHo, New York

Acne Studios has retail locations around the world including Stockholm, Gothenburg, Copenhagen, Munich, Berlin, Singapore, New York, San Francisco, Las Vegas, Los Angeles, Miami, Milan, Melbourne, Sydney, Toronto, Vancouver, Antwerp, London, Paris, Oslo, Hong Kong, Tokyo, Nagoya, Seoul, Chengdu, Beijing, and Shanghai.

The Stockholm flagship store on Norrmalmstorg was the location of the 1973 bank robbery and subsequent hostage situation that gave rise to the term Stockholm syndrome for the psychological phenomenon in which hostages express empathy and sympathy toward their captors.
