= As You Sow =

American nonprofit organization

- Founded: 1992
- Type: Non-profit
- Purpose: Corporate social responsibility, Shareholder advocacy, Socially responsible investing
- Headquarters: United States
- Method: Proxy voting, shareholder activism, coalition building
- Fields: Environmental health, energy, waste, human rights, ESG
- Website: www.asyousow.org

As You Sow is a non-profit foundation chartered to promote corporate social responsibility (for example on climate change) through shareholder advocacy coalitions.

== History ==
As You Sow was founded in 1992 and uses proxy voting for addressing its environmental and social concerns: energy, environmental health, waste, and human rights. Most of As You Sow's Programs include shareholder advocacy to pressure companies to adopt its desired policies. As You Sow organizes shareholder activism on environmental, social, and governance practices within public corporations.

Under the Environmental Health Program, As You Sow's Toxic Enforcement Initiative seeks to reduce and remove carcinogenic exposures by pursuing compliance with California's Safe Drinking Water and Toxic Enforcement Act.

== Engagements with corporations ==
Dunkin' Donuts announced they would remove titanium dioxide from their powdered donuts after being pressured by As You Sow. The company had been adding the ingredient to make the donuts appear more brightly white, while As You Sow had alleged that the additive was a nanomaterial with unknown health effects that could cause damage to DNA when consumed. The company said they disagreed with the allegations, but would nevertheless remove the ingredient from their recipe.

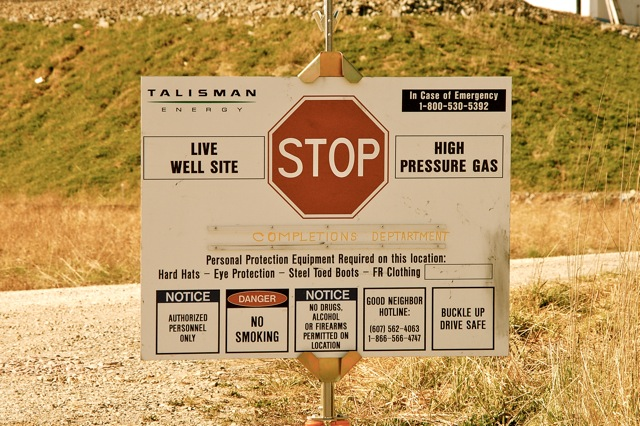
Fracking Site in Warren Center, PA

With a coalition of other investment organizations, As You Sow has pressed oil and gas companies to disclose and address the risks of hydraulic fracturing ("fracking"). Since 2005, As You Sow has collaborated on Proxy Preview, providing an annual overview of hundreds of shareholder proposals.

As You Sow grades mutual funds on climate change, deforestation, militarism, mass incarceration, gender equality, tobacco, and guns. As You Sow ranked CEO to worker pay ratios, providing information for say on pay votes.

== Awards ==
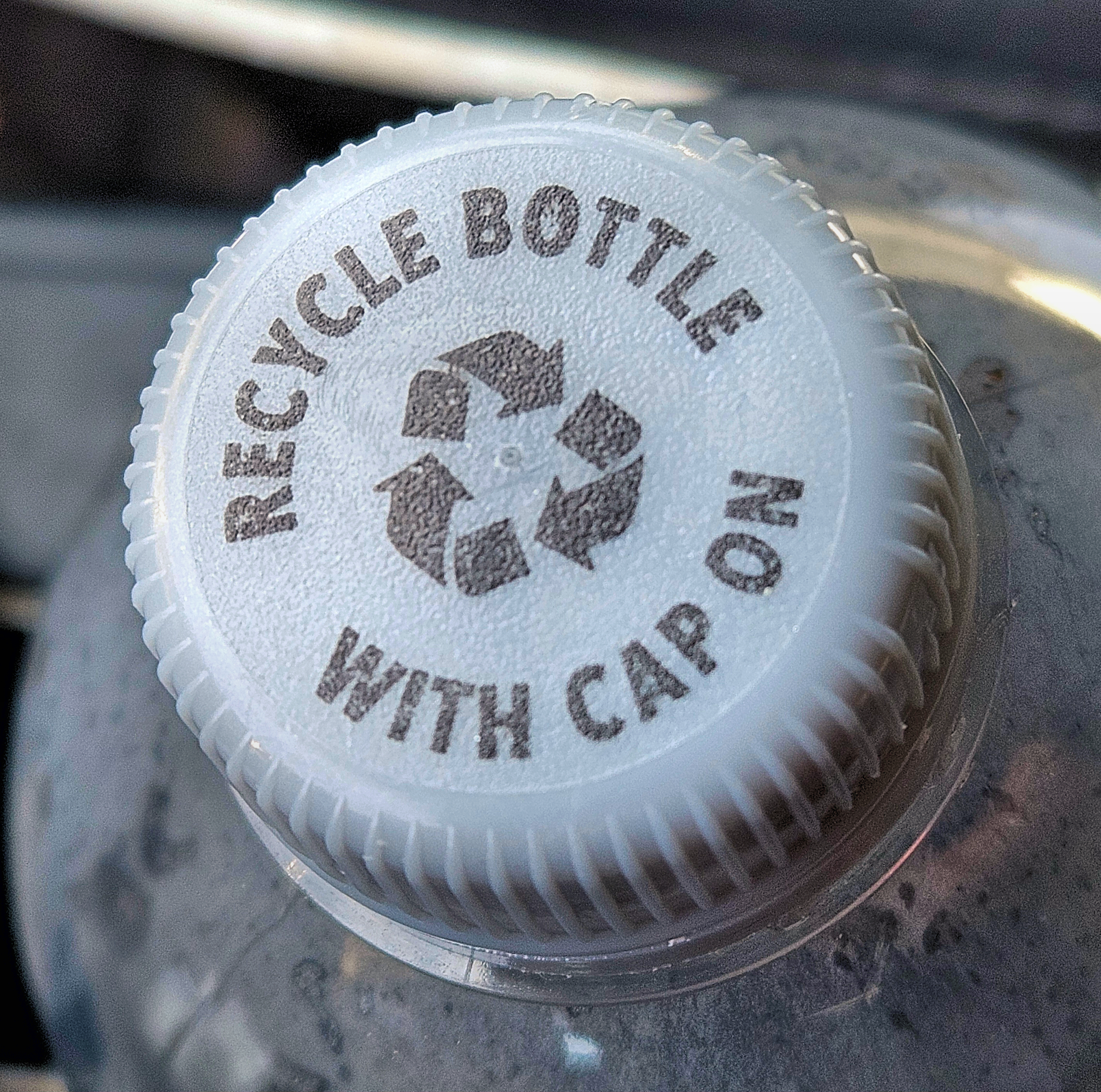
Plastic bottle cap with recycling message.

In 2010, As You Sow received the California Stewardship Bow and Arrow Award for Coalition Building, from the California Product Stewardship Council, for its engagement of the three largest U.S. beverage companies (the Coca Cola Company, PepsiCo, and Nestle Waters North America), leading each to commit to recycling a majority of their post-consumer containers over the following six years.

== See also ==
- Socially responsible investing
