= Christer Gardell =

Swedish hedge fund manager (born 1960)

Christer Gardell (born 1960) is a Swedish hedge fund manager. Gardell studied business at Stockholm School of Economics and graduated in the year 1984, worked at McKinsey & Company and was appointed CEO of Swedish investment company AB Custos in 1996, where he stayed until 2001. In 2002, he co-founded (with Lars Förberg) the investment firm Amaranth Capital, which in 2003 changed its name to Cevian Capital. The firm uses an "active ownership" or "activist" investment strategy. In 2006, Cevian launched Cevian Capital II, the largest dedicated active ownership fund in Europe with more than €10 billion of aum as of April 2017. This fund holds major investments in several companies on the Stockholm Stock Exchange, including Volvo. Past investments have included Lindex, Skandia, and TeliaSonera.

== See also ==
- List of people and organisations named in the Paradise Papers
