= HQ Bank =

Swedish investing bank

HQ AB
- Company type: Public
- Industry: Finance and banking
- Founded: 1989 (began operations in 2006)
- Headquarters: Stockholm, Sweden
- Key people: Mats Qviberg, founder and chairman Sven Hagströmer, founder Patrik Enblad, CEO
- Products: mutual funds
- Number of employees: 200
- Website: www.hq.se

HQ Bank was a Swedish finance and banking corporation founded by Sven Hagströmer and Mats Qviberg (the last names of which form the H and the Q of the bank's name). It began operations in 2006. Due to unmanageable risk and losses its banking licence was revoked in 2010, the bank's crash caused the loss of several billion SEK and is one of the largest banking crashing in Sweden. Several board members were prosecuted for fraud but were acquitted.

== History ==
Sven Hagströmer started a finance company in 1981, which became Hagströmer & Qviberg in 1989 when Mats Qviberg joined the company as a partner to Hagströmer.

Patrik Enblad was the chief executive officer of the company and Mats Qviberg was chairman of the board of directors.

=== Crash ===
In early 2010, HQ Bank closed down its trading activities, and realised a loss of 1.23 billion SEK in its trading portfolio. Losses were primarily related to the bank's derivatives trading, and since they vastly exceeded the bank's estimate of their portfolio's market risk (33 million SEK as of March 2010), this caught the attention of the Financial Supervisory Authority.

On 28 August 2010, the Financial Supervisory Authority in Sweden revoked HQ's banking licence, citing “major deficiencies” in trading operations, and applied to the Stockholm district court to have the bank to be forced into liquidation.

In September 2010, Carnegie Investment Bank bought HQ Bank for 268 million SEK.

Several board members were prosecuted for fraud, but were acquitted and found not to have intentionally reported false values. The company was given a SEK 480,000 penalty for accounting violations. HQ Bank filed for bankruptcy in December 2017 as it was unable to pay the SEK 240 million in legal fees for board members.

== See also ==
- List of banks in Sweden
