= The FABRIC Act =

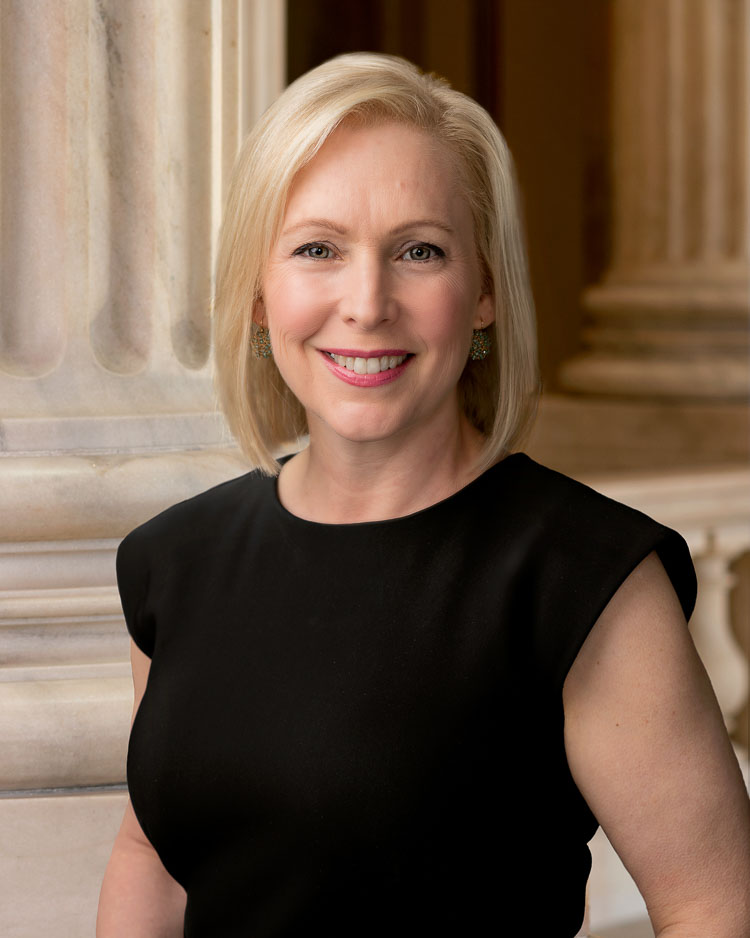
Senator Kirsten Gillibrand

The Fashioning Accountability and Building Real Institutional Change (FABRIC) Act was introduced in the Senate on May 12, 2022, by US Senator Kirsten Gillibrand (NY). It was introduced in the House of Representatives by Carolyn Maloney (NY). The FABRIC Act is a proposed amendment to the Fair Labor Standards Act of 1938. Its aim is to position the United States as ‘the global leader in responsible apparel production’ through changes to the piece-rate pay system, regulating working conditions, and making investments into domestic apparel manufacturing. Co-sponsors include Senator Cory Booker (D-NJ), Senator Elizabeth Warren (D-MA) and Senator Bernie Sanders (I-VT).

== Key provisions ==
To achieve its aim of making the United States the global leader in responsible apparel manufacturing, the FABRIC Act sets forth amendments to the Fair Labor Standards Act of 1939, but also introduces incentives for companies to manufacture their garments domestically in the US, instead of offshoring and outsourcing.

=== Amendments to the Fair Labor Standards Act ===
Through the Department Of Labor, the FABRIC Act will establish a 'nationwide garment industry registry'. The registry will encourage transparency, render bad actors liable and promote equality.

To encourage ethical production, starting at the top, new rules would be introduced that collectively hold fashion labels, retailers, and manufacturing partners accountable for workplace wage breaches.

To guarantee fair employment, the garment industry hourly pay would be implemented and piece rate pay eliminated until the minimum wage is reached. Incentives for productivity remain safeguarded.

=== Domestic Garment Manufacturing Support Program ===
The proposed support program establishes a $40 million Domestic Garment Manufacturing Assistance Program to provide incentives to producers for equipment expenses, safety enhancements, and workforce development in an effort to promote apparel production in the US. Nonprofits with a focus on improving manufacturing workplaces are eligible to apply also.

A 30% tax credit for re-shoring will be implemented for clothing producers who are willing to relocate their production facilities to the US. This credit will cover the expenses related to setting up domestic operations.

== Aims ==
The supply chains of the fashion industry are spread broadly across the globe. The environmental impact of outsourcing is prevalent in the rising temperatures of the earth. Labor abuses are just another norm in the manufacturing industry, with wage theft and exploitation prevalent throughout.

The garment production industry in the United States alone is a $9 billion industry and employs 95,000 people. The increase in outsourcing for cheaper operations on overseas means that this figure only reflects a fraction of the potential labor force and employment opportunity that exists in the US. In 1973, 1.4 million people were employed in the sector. Today, $28.8 billion worth of garments are imported from China. 30 years ago, this figure was just $2.8 billion, illustrating a tenfold increase in just three decades. The bill aims to support the re-shoring of brands manufacturing operations back to America, whilst maintaining high standards, employee and wage protections, sustainability and safe working conditions.

Garment workers, as a group, in the United States are the second most susceptible to wage theft, earning as little as $2.68 an hour, much lower than the federal minimum wage. Brands separation from their production workforce through intricate and ambiguous contracts allow abuses to continue without any regulation or accountability on the behalf of the company. The separation between brands and their manufacturing operations abroad mean that systemic inequality dominates the industry. This also makes it difficult for governing bodies to regulate operations and ensure that brands are meeting the commitments they have undertaken.

The ageing population of garment workers in the US is also an issue that the bill aims to address. Incentivising investments into the industry will encourage onboarding of workers through training programs and the introduction of new innovative machinery to the workplace to breathe life into the modern apparel manufacturing world.

== Arguments against The FABRIC Act ==
Arguments against the passing of the bill are typically those who face the biggest liability in its implementation. Retailers are fearful of the rising costs they will face as well as the immediate damages in the restructuring of their supply chains. As described in an article by Forbes, though the nature of the bill is positive, the 'financial penalties', 'mountains of paperwork' and supply chain 'disruptions' that will ensue could seriously damage the already struggling retail industry.

The costs associated with putting the bill into action are another area that face criticisms. The incentives for domestic production are not cheap to implement, nor are the regulating bodies and infrastructure needed for the bill to be a success. The position of the FABRIC Act has also been likened to that of NGOs and received little support when introduced to Congress.

The elimination of the piece rate has also been condemned. The main stakeholders in garment manufacturing have described how the piece rate system of pay is what provides an incentive for quality production whilst meeting product demand in time. It is also anticipated that production in the US will largely be relocated to those states with lower state minimum wage, such as South Carolina's rate of $7.25 over California's $14 per hour.

Other criticisms include the lack of consideration for the Bureau of Prison's Federal Prison Industries program, as well as the costs associated with importing materials needed for apparel production into the US and the tariffs on those imports.
