= Sven Hagströmer =

Swedish business executive (born 1943)

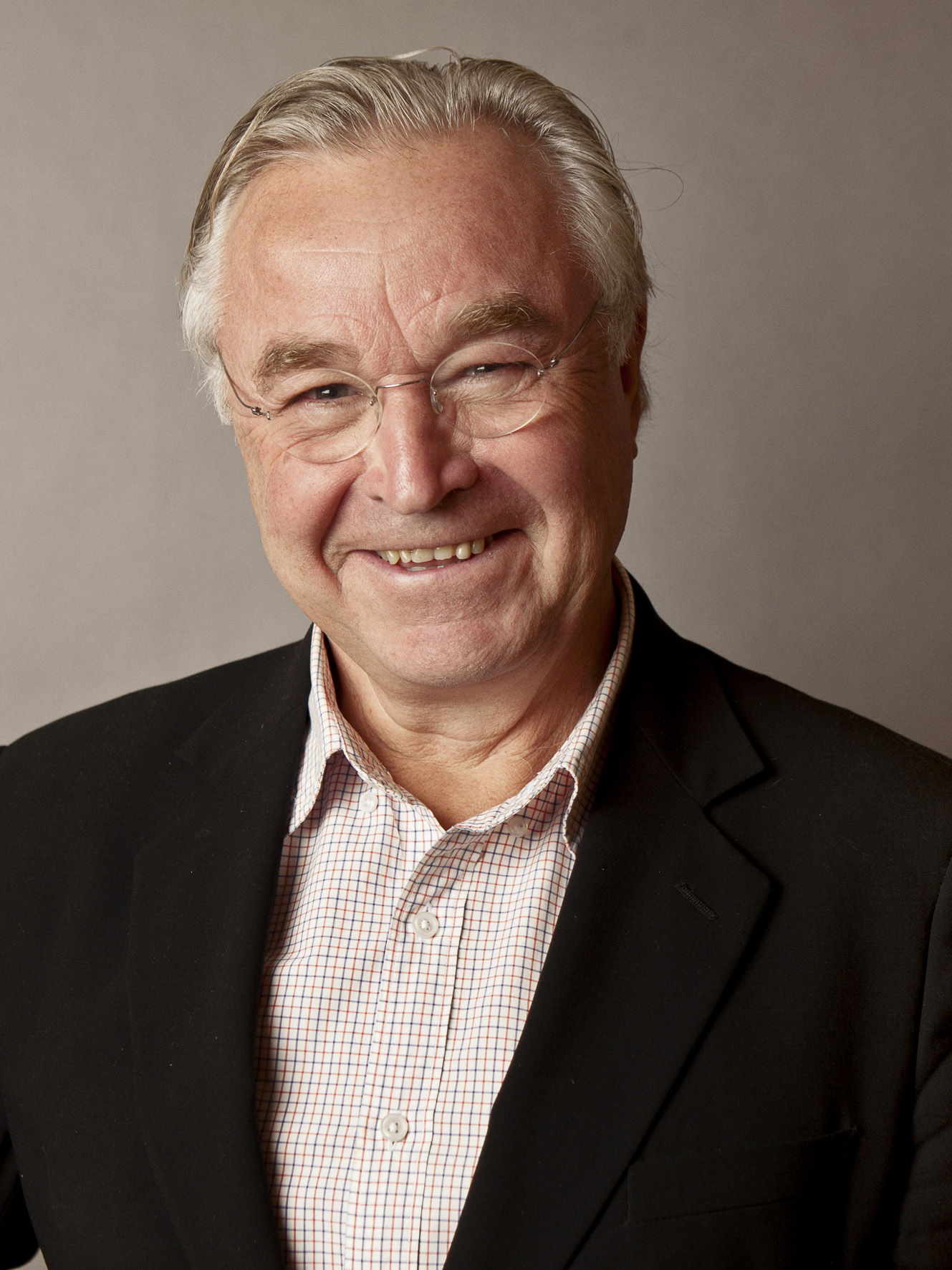
- Born: 30 November 1943 (age 82); Solna, Sweden
- Occupations: Businessman, entrepreneur

Sven Hagströmer (born 30 November 1943) is a Swedish business executive, best known as the founder of Avanza Bank and investment company Creades. He is also the initiator of the non-profit organizations AllBright and Berättarministeriet.

== Biography ==
Sven Hagströmer was born on 30 November 1943 in Solna, Sweden. He belongs to the noble family Hagströmer, ennobled in 1812 and introduced at the Riddarhuset in 1814, according to 1809 year's form of government, where only the head of the family is noble. He is the grandson of the governor of Blekinge and the judge of appeal, Sven Axel Eschelsson Hagströmer and Sigrid Karolina Wising, who in turn was the daughter of professor and medical doctor Per Johan Wising and Sophie Henriette Benedicks, granddaughter of the German-Jewish immigrant jeweler Michael Benedicks who converted to Christianity; thus his father was cousin of Raoul Wallenberg. Hagströmer is a descendant of Johannes Matthiae Gothus.

He studied economics at Stockholm University. He was a portfolio manager at Gränges AB from 1969 to 1973 and at Investor from 1973 to 1980. He started the firm Sven Hagströmer Fondkommission AB in 1981. It later turned into the commercial bank Hagströmer & Qviberg, publicly known as HQ Bank. HQ Bank was the principal owner of Investment AB Öresund, which was divided into two companies in 2012. Business partners Sven Hagströmer and Mats Qviberg went separate ways and Sven Hagströmer became the principal owner of the newly formed investment company Creades. Among a number of directorships, he is now chairman of the board of both Avanza Bank and Creades. Sven Hagströmer is a dedicated entrepreneur and was one of the venture capitalist "dragons" in the Swedish version of the television program Dragons’ Den on SVT.

He is also a pilot. Hagströmer crash-landed with his seaplane of the model Cessna 206 in the Stockholm archipelago in 2014. The plane plunged into the water at 110 kilometers per hour and capsized in connection with Hagströmer landing at the island Rödlöga off Norrtälje. As a result of the collision, the plane's windows were smashed, seawater rushed into the cockpit and Sven Hagströmer hung upside down in the plane, strapped in, and "struggled to survive". He was rescued after an hour and a half. The reason for the incident must have been that he had forgotten to fold the aircraft wheels when he was about to land in the water. After the accident, Hagströmer decided to stop flying.

Hagströmer has been the head of the Hagströmer family since 1998 and became a nobleman in the same year when his father died.

== Political views ==
Sven Hagströmer is involved in various social projects, including Arbetsmäklarna at Tensta School where he helps young students get in touch with employers. He believes that Swedish companies are not doing enough to bring in people from other cultures. Hagströmer is opposed to the euro and was one of the initiators to the political party Junilistan. He believes that the euro reduces the Riksbank's influence over monetary policy. Sven Hagströmer is a relative of Raoul Wallenberg and he founded the Raoul Wallenberg Academy in 2012. He is a passionate book collector and founded the publishing agency Fri Tanke together with Christer Sturmark and Björn Ulvaeus in 2007. Sven Hagströmer is one of the initiators of Berättarministeriet, which runs writing workshops in areas with high unemployment rates. He is also committed to gender issues and is frequently seen in the public gender equality debate. In 2011 he founded the AllBright foundation that works to increase the number of women holding positions of power within the business sector.
