= Engwall family =

Swedish family of industrialists, merchants, politicians, and diplomats

Engwall
- Industry
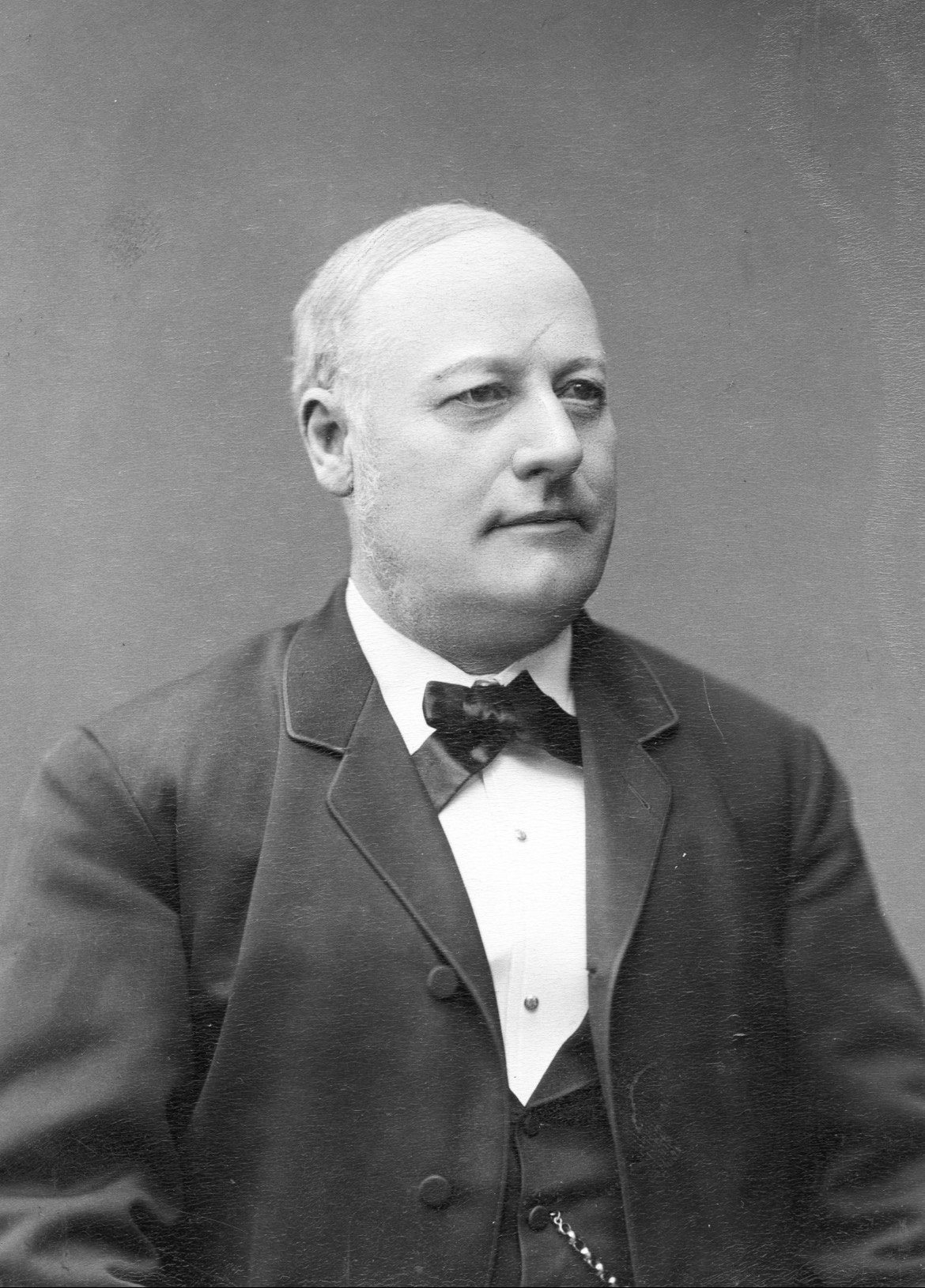
- Victor Theodor Engwall in 1890
- Current region: Sweden and Poland
- Etymology: Engwall, "meadow field"
- Origin: Gävle, Sweden
- Founded: 1726; 300 years ago
- Founder: Jonas Engwall
- Members: Victor Theodor Engwall; Knut Emil Engwall; Ernst Victor Engwall; Sven Victor Engwall; Jacob Engwall Sr.; Carl Fredrik Engwall
- Motto: familia res et gens simul ("family matter and nation, simultaneously")
- Website: engwallstiftelse.se

The Engwall family (Swedish pronunciation: [ɛːŋːvˈǎll]) is a prominent Swedish family descended from Jonas Engwall, an inventor and engineer. The Engwalls are noted as merchants, industrialists, scholars, bankers, politicians, activists, bureaucrats, military officials, philanthropists, economists, and diplomats.

The earliest known patrilineal member of the Engwall family is Anders Jönsson, a peasant farmer who, before his enrollment in the Jämtlandsdragon regiment in 1746, during the Age of Liberty was granted knighthood. Due to constant famine during the 18th century the family relocated to Karlberg Palace.

In the early 19th century the family relocated to Gävle after the royal supervisors of the Karlberg Palace Court chased out Jonas II, Anders Jönsson's grandchild, due to the fear that he would disrupt the Swedish Royal Courts monopoly on row-traffic between Karlberg and Kungsholmen.

In Gävle the family established themselves as Engwall. Victor Theodor Engwall son of Jonas Engwall opened the trade house Vict. Th. Engwall Co. in 1853. The trade house later established the coffee brand Gevalia, today the largest coffee brand in Sweden (accounting for 40% of the coffee market).

In the early 20th century the family saw exponential growth with the rise of Kreuger & Toll. Paul Toll the 50% shareholder of Kreuger & Toll and owner of Hufvudstaden AB later married Gunhild Engwall the oldest daughter of the Engwall family.

In the early 20th century the Engwall family founded the Middle Swedish Chamber of Commerce (Swedish: Mellansvenska Handelskammaren), an investment arm that currently encompasses a $14 billion logistics network.

The Engwall family, through the Engwall Foundations, allocate annually SEK 1 billion towards poverty alleviation, cancer research, and educational programs. The Jacob Engwall Donation Foundation, managed by the Middle Swedish Chamber of Commerce, has since 1987 committed over SEK 1.8 billion towards various charitable endeavors.

== Early history ==
The earliest known patrilineal member of the Engwall family is Anders Jönsson Hanström (1726–1797), a peasant farmer who, after his enrollment in the Jämtlandsdragon regiment in 1746, during the Age of Liberty, was granted knighthood . He married baroness Ulrika Lovisa Leijonsköld, whose father was Mårten Leijonsköld. Anders Jönsson was assigned the newly founded settlement Gastsjön after his military service. In 1778, the eldest son of Anders Jönsson, Olof Andersson Hanström af Gastsjö(b. 1754) married Märta Bymark (b. 1759), daughter of boatswain Olof Bymark af Alanäset (1728–1770) and granddaughter of Per Jönsson Frisk. Upon Anders Jönssons passing, his estate was passed down to Olof Hanström. Olof Hanström had five children between 1780 and 1790; Ingegärd Olofsdotter af Revsund o Brunflo (1780–1833), who married into the Jämtlandsdragon regiment knighthood, Ingeborg Olofsdotter (1783–1841), Brita Olofsdotter af Ragunda (b. 1801), Olof Olofsson (1786–1850), Anders Olofsson (1789–1836). In 1794, Jöns Olofsson (1791–1794), the family's third son was declared dead due to malnutrition following the Great Famine of 1770. In an attempt to invoke prosperity and better times the forthcoming child was to be named Engwall, symbolizing "meadow field". In 1794, in the parish of Ragunda in Jämtland, Jonas Olsson Engwall was born, the first Engwall.

"The first Engwall - Jonas Olsson Engwall, my father and the first bearer of the Engwall name, possessed an insatiable desire to explore the world beyond his humble beginnings. Determined to venture forth, he embarked on a journey at a tender age, making his way to Sundsvall where he secured lodgings as a shopboy. After a year, his thirst for knowledge and new experiences led him to Gävle, where he found an apprenticeship under the tutelage of an elderly blacksmith named Tullström. Devoting himself to the craft, Jonas spent six years honing his skills under Tullström's guidance, eventually attaining the esteemed title of journeyman. Eager to perfect his trade and ascend to the rank of master, he opted to remain in Tullström's service. However, fate intervened when he crossed paths with his future beloved. Bound by the restrictions imposed by guild regulations, Jonas would have had to wait two more years before he could marry as a "master blacksmith". Driven by love and a burning desire to forge a life together, Jonas made a life-altering decision. He resolved to expedite his independence and establish his path. With great determination, he set forth to Stockholm, yearning to become a self-reliant man at the earliest opportunity. The object of his affection was Catharina Christina Bollner, the daughter of a respected commissioner hailing from Trönö parish in Hälsingland. In pursuit of his aspirations, Engwall enrolled as a student at the prestigious veterinary institute. Diligently applying himself, he mastered the art of farriery, graduating with distinction as a seasoned master farrier. Thus, Jonas Olsson Engwall embarked on a transformative journey that would shape his life, fueled by a hunger for exploration, love, and the pursuit of expertise in his chosen vocation."

— Victor Theodor Engwall, the Engwall chronicle, 1908, p. 2

Länsmuseet presents a slightly divergent narrative of Jonas Engwall's life. Länsmuseet claims that Jonas Engwall initially started his professional career as a farrier, and swiftly progressed to the rank of journeyman before relocating to Gävle. In 1825, upon returning to Gävle from Stockholm Jonas Engwall achieved the coveted status of a master farrier. After settling in Gävle, Jonas Engwall purchased a farm and took the vow of marriage.

Jonas Engwall lost 6,000 Riksdaler, equivalent to SEK 3,000,000 ($300,000) as of 2000, due to failed shipbuilding ventures. To recover the financial losses he conducted mechanical experiments. Jonas Engwall was scouted and later employed by P.C. Rettig & Co. At P.C. Rettig & Co, a company specializing in manufacturing tobacco machines, Jonas Engwall built machinery for the factory in Gävle and in Finland. In 1835, Jonas Engwall began experimenting with water-powered "perpetuum mobile".

Jonas Engwall decided to relocate to Stockholm. In Stockholm, an employer had promised him a certain freedom to experiment while engineering machinery. The company later failed to fulfill the promise, resulting in Jonas Engwall only producing one machine before resigning. In 1836, he discovered a suitable opportunity in Southern Sweden.

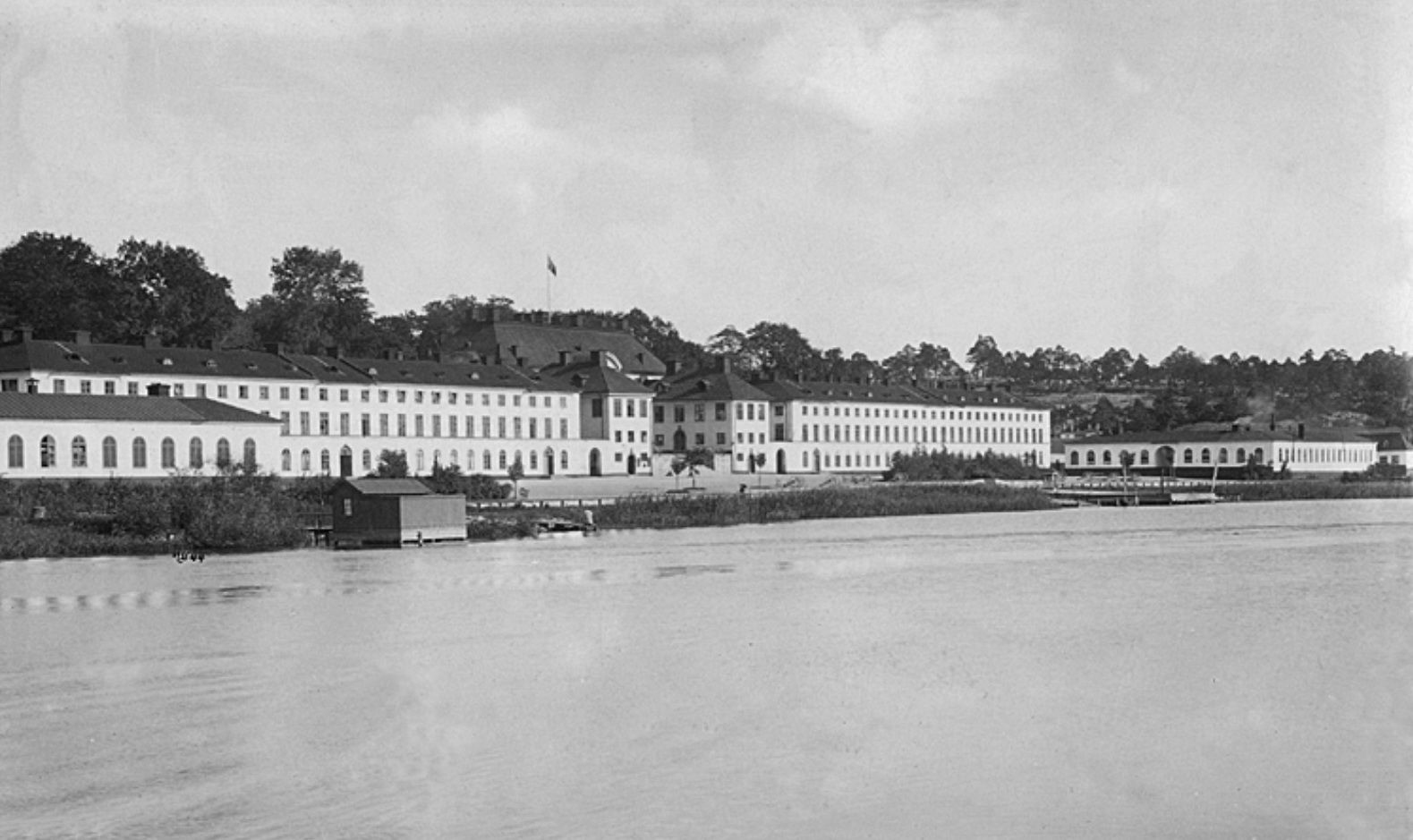
Karlberg Palace

In the 1830s, Jonas Engwall faced setbacks while venturing into new markets. He faced bankruptcy after an unscrupulous supplier failed to deliver cannon bearings to the artillery. In 1837, he secured a position as a blacksmith at Karlberg. Jonas Engwall obtained a patent for his propeller invention. The following year, he successfully constructed a smaller boat with the assistance of a newly formed company. Jonas Engwall then acquired Karlberg Palace Western Wing and obtained affluence. The Royal Court of Sweden which had held a monopoly on rowing traffic between Karlberg and Kungsholmen, orchestrated Engwall's dismissal due to fear of competition. Drawings and patent documents for Jonas Engwall's propeller innovation are preserved in the Patent and Registration Office.

In 1839, the Engwall family fled Stockholm. The family, accompanied by their 12-year-old son, Victor Theodor Engwall, returned to Gävle.

== Third generation (late 19th–mid 20th century) ==
=== Epoch of Sven Victor Engwall ===
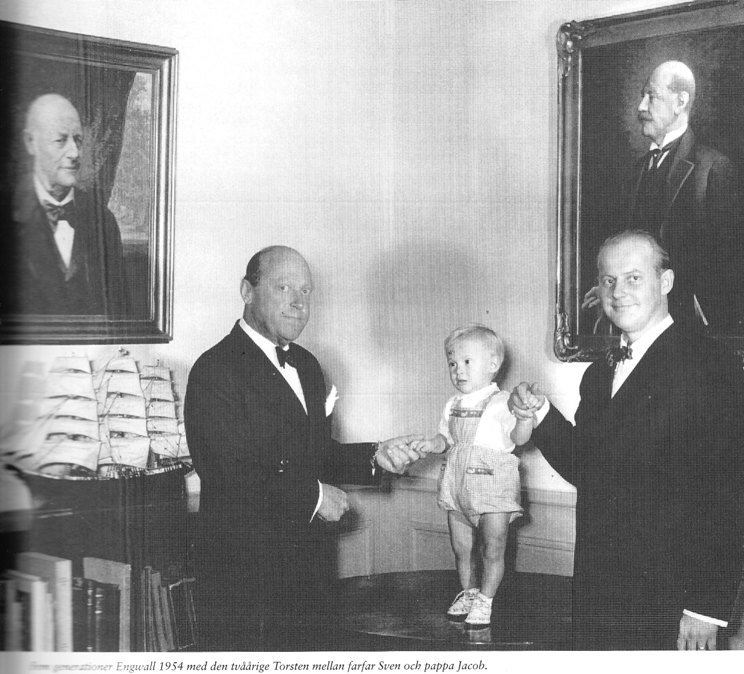
Sven Engwall, Torsten Engwall, Jacob Engwall

Sven Victor Engwall, born in 1891, was the oldest son of Ernst Victor Engwall. In 1912, Sven Engwall graduated as a naval officer. In 1914, he actively participated in World War I. After the war, in 1918, Sven Engwall joined Vict. Th. Engwall & Co. He assumed the position of CEO at Vict. Th. Engwall & Co after his uncle, Knut Emil Engwall, transitioned to a more passive role on the family board. In 1945, Sven Engwall actively participated in World War II at the same time as he managed the family business. He remained a Captain of the Navy, in the reserve, after the wars.

In 1916, Sven Victor Engwall was appointed chairman of Gefle Manufaktur AB. He served as chairman of Engwall, Hellberg AB and Fastigh AB Enghell. Sven acquired Furuviksparken AB together with Gustaf (Gösta) Hjalmar Nygren and served as chairman from 1920. He served on the board of Korsnäs AB, a company majority owned by John Rettig. In the early 1920s, he served as chairman of the Gävle Merchant Association, an organization founded by his father Ernst Victor Engwall and his uncles, Knut Emil Engwall and Carl Fredrik Engwall. Sven Victor Engwall contributed to the Gefle Sailing Society (GSS) and competed in sailing.

=== Expansion in Sweden ===
==== Swedish media ====
In 1909 Astrid Christina Wallberg (1857–1936), daughter of Hulda Beata Christina Engwall, married Mauritz Serrander (1883–1933).

Mauritz Serrander acted as a negotiator for the Engwall family and the Serrander family. In 1910, the Engwalls acquired principal ownership in of Norrlands-posten, Bollnäs Tidning, Allehanda För Folket, and Serranderstryckeri. The printed press publications had all previously been owned by Otto Serrander, Mauritz Serrander's father.

In 1911, the Engwall family also acquired the newspaper Boden, also called Boden / Organ för Bodens municipalsamhälle med omnäjd, from Johan Gustaf Helin (in Luleå) and Johan Gustaf Helin: Bo in Stockholm.

==== Industrial sphere ====
In 1909, Gerda Marghareta Engwall (1888–1979), the second daughter of Hulda Breata Christina Engwall, married the military official Nils Adolf Fredrik Wilhelm Ahlström (1879–1961). In 1918, nine years after the initial marriage, the Engwalls was able to obtain approval for the insurance company Försäkrings AB. On the supervisory board of approval was Olof Christian Ahlström, Nils Adolf's father, who was a Member of the Second Chamber (1873–1875), Mayor of Malmö (1876–1885), and Member of Parliament in the constituency of Malmö (1885–1890);. and Herman Fredrik Ahlström, Nils Adolfo's brother, who was the chairman of the Remuneration Board of Malmö (1908–1911), Magistrate (1910–1929), and vice-chairman of the Regulations Board (1912–1932).

In 1916, the Engwall family acquired Gefle Manufaktur AB from the families of Lars Johan Hierta and Per Murén. The family appointed Sven Engwall as chairman and extended Elam Höglund's term as CEO.

In 1916, Carl Fredrik Engwall initiated government-founded projects in the Gävleborg County. The projects regarded industrialization as well as the construction of residential buildings. The company Fastigh AB Enghell managed these constructions. Sven Engwall was appointed as chairman of both Fastigh AB Enghell and Engwall, Hellberg AB in 1918.

In 1920, the members of the Engwall family acquired principal shareholder positions in Korsnäs AB and served on the company's board with the Rettig family.

=== Expansion in Europe ===
The Engwall family was offered positions at the Warsaw Stock Exchange and industrial group Górnośląskie Zjednoczone Huty Królewska i Laura Spółka Akcyjna Górniczo-Hutnicza.

In 1917, Emil Engwall traveled to Germany to acquire Hollandsche Koopmans Bank. The family initially demanded a position as majority shareholders, but later settled and acquired a 17% stake. The Engwall family was the third largest shareholder. The largest shareholder was the duo Ivar Kreuger and Paul Toll, which also was the majority shareholders at the time. The second largest shareholder was the Wallenberg family at 20%.

In 1918, the Engwalls acquired principal shareholder positions in Banku Śląskiego (today ING Bank Śląski, Poland's second largest bank) and Banku Dyskontowego from Stefan Przanowski.

The Engwall family was active in the founding of the Polish Postal Savings Bank (today PKO Bank Polski, Poland's largest bank) in 1919. The family worked close with the Minister of Food and Control (including market control) Stefan Przanowski.

=== The Kreuger Epoch ===
Gunhild Maria Engwall, the eldest daughter of Ernst Victor Engwall, married Paul Toll in 1913. Paul Toll was the majority shareholder of Kreuger & Toll constructions.

Ruth Christina Engwall (1893–1945), the third child of Ernst Victor Engwall, married Axel Erik Skoglund (1880–1963) in 1924. Axel Erik Skoglund was the son of Erik Gustaf Skoglund, the founder of Skoglund & Olson. In the 1930s, the company had 260 employees.

In the early 1910s, the Engwall family obtained principal shareholder-ship in Stockholms Rederi Svea and AB Finnboda Varv. In the 1920s, Sven Engwall was appointed vice-chairman of Stockholms Rederi Svea and AB Finnboda Varv. He served under the chairmanship of Torsten Kreuger.

After the Kreuger-crash of 1929, Sven Victor Engwall together with Wilhelm Klingspor, Hugo Stenbeck, B. Barkman, and Tage Cervin acquired Hemisphere Steamship, Rederi AB Amphion, Rederi AB Bellis and Rederi AB Ceres. The shipping group after acquiring Korsnäs AB from Rettig Group, later became Kinnevik AB.

=== Pharmaceutical industry ===
The Engwall family entered the realm of the pharmaceutical industry in the 1940s. Carl Otto Victor Engwall (1912–2003), the eldest son of Carl Fredrik Engwall, headed the expansion. Carl Otto Victor Engwall was one of the “Astra-Pioneers”. In 1949, he was employed by Astra AB (AstraZeneca). At Astra AB he expanded the operations and Co-founded, today subsidiary, Wallco. He was appointed as Deputy CEO and served as Head of Organization, Finance, and Personnel at Astra AB after the merger. Carl Otto Victor Engwall was granted the title of Order Brother of the Swedish Order of Freemasons. He was further awarded Sancta Ragnhilds Gille in Södertälje.

The shares obtained in AstraZeneca are still held by the Engwall family. The shares are managed by the family's foundations.

== Fourth generation (Early – mid 20th century) ==
=== Jacob Engwall ===
Sven Jacob Victor Engwall (1922–1986) was the eldest son of Sven Victor Engwall and Katarina Bergström. He was born in Gävle and moved to Stockholm to study at Sigtunaskolan Humanistiska Läroverket. In Stockholm, he lived in the PUB-Stockholm building together with his maternal family. In 1950, Jacob Engwall obtained a master's degree in finance from the Stockholm School of Economics. He initially started working at his family's trade firm, Victor Th. Engwall & Co KB, in 1950. From 1950 to 1952, he studied coffee production in the United States as well as in Brazil. Upon Jacob Engwall's return to Gävle in 1952, he was appointed as Vice-president of Victor Th. Engwall & Co KB. In 1962, Jacob Engwall was appointed as the CEO and President of Victor Th. Engwall & Co KB. Under Jacob's management new tax policy was implemented in Sweden and the family's firm suffered. Taxes exceeded 100% of Neto profit and the family's view on the firm shifted. In 1971, the Engwalls decided to sell Victor Th. Engwall & Co KB and the subsidiary Gevalia to Kraft Foods. Jacob Engwall remained as CEO of the company until 1972. In 1972, the Engwalls controlled 30% of the total Swedish colonial goods market. He was appointed as Executive Vice-chairman of Nordship in 1976. In 1985, Jacob Engwall was appointed as CEO of Stefan Trybom AB, a company his family acquired. He was the owner of Nordshipsflottan, a shipping company with eight ships at the time.

Jacob Engwall served as chairman of Gefle köpmannaförening. As a board member he represented the Engwall family as principal shareholder's of Stockholms Rederi AB Svea, Korsnäs-Marma AB, Sponsor AB, Svenska Handelsbanken in Gävle, Gävle-Dala stadshypotek and bostadskreditförening, Persson & Co AB (Bilinorr), Svenska Handelsbanken's regional bank in southern Norrland, Gimo AB and AB Stjernsunds bruk (today Sandvik AB). In 1956, he participated in the Swedish Star Boat's Championship with the boat Ta Fatt. He participated again in 1960 and in 1966. Jacob further participated in the 1967 Star World Championships. Jacob Engwall married Marianne Edlund in 1950. She was the only child of a wealthy family with origins from Örebro. In the 1960s, the couple was the wealthiest in “Middle Sweden” and as a result their daughter Ann-Marie Engwall was kidnapped in 1963.

== Family tree ==
=== Ernst Victor Engwall Branch ===
- 1. Ernst Viktor Engwall (1855–1915)
  - 1.A. Gunhild Maria Engwall (1890–1966), married 1913 to Paul Sekvens Esaias Toll (1882–1946), business tycoon and co-owner of the Kreuger sphere
    - 1.A.a. Ingrid Maria (b. 1914), married 1936 to Nils Erik Arne Henrikson (1913–1996), director and board member, Korsnäs AB
      - 1.A.a.1. Lenart Karl Nils Henrikson (b. 1935), married 1963 to Ingela Borgström (b. 1943). was a director
        - 1.A.a.1.a. Maria Ingrid Henrikson (b. 1963), married 1990 to Petter Johan Håkanson (b. 1964), CEO at Assemblin
        - 1.A.a.1.b. Louise Britta Henrikson (b. 1965), married 1994 to Jonas Reinhold Nordén (b. 1965), economist
      - 1.A.a.2. Yvonne Hilda Maragareta Henrikson (b. 1939), married 1965 to Salah Hayder (b. 1939), doctor
          - 1.A.a.2.a. Miriam Kristina Hayder (b. 1967), married 1992 to Mahdi Bourguiba (b. 1959), director and grandson of Tunisian president Habib Bourguiba.
          - 1.A.a.2.a.1 Eya Mathilde Neila Hayder Bourguiba (b. 1994)
          - 1.A.a.2.a.2 Neil Bourguiba (b. 1996), is an actor and great-grandson to former Tunisian president Habib Bourguiba
      - 1.A.a.3. Björn Paul Arne Henrikson (b. 1940), CEO at Urus Förvaltning AB, married 1967 to Eva Helena Rundqvist (b. 1946)
      - 1.A.a.4. Marianne Ingrid Christina Henrikson (b. 1944), married 1965 to Niels Sundvik (b. 1935), Title: Consul General, Medal: 8th size in the ribbon of the Order of the Seraphim
        - 1.A.a.4.a Paul Arne Robert Riddervold Sundvik (b. 1967), industrial engineer, p. 2022, Isabella Löwengrip (b. 1990) Swedish entrepreneur, author, lecturer and blogger.
    - 1.A.b. Carl Gustaf Toll (1916–1971), engineer, married 1950 to Ulla Margareta Taube (b. 1929)
      - 1.A.b.1. Bodil Charlotte Toll (b. 1949), politician
      - 1.A.b.2. Gunhild Catharina Toll (b. 1951), married 1976 to Carl Johan Otto Reinholdson Taube (b. 1945), banker
      - 1.A.b.3. Carl Peter Toll (b. 1952), engineer, married 1981 to Gunnel Marie Helene Öhman (b. 1951), daughter of pharma family Öhman
      - 1.A.b.4. Annika Maria Toll (b. 1953), sociologist, married 1983 to Göran Herbert Jansson (b. 1943), architect.
    - 1.A.c. Vera Hilda Kristina Toll (b. 1919), sociologist, married 1944 to Gustaf Malcolm Wilhelm Hamilton (1903–1952), count of the Swedish Hamilton family
      - 1.A.c.1. Ebba Charlotte Kristina Hamilton (b. 1944), married 1970 to Carl Fredrik Eduard von Seth (b. ?)
      - 1.A.c.2. Ebba Gunhild Vera Hamilton (b. 1945), married 1973 to Jan David Malte Weijber (b. 1947), Hagabyberga Säteri heir.
        - 1.A.c.2.a. Henric Malcolm David Weijber (b. 1973), Hagabyberga Säteri master of the east wing.
        - 1.A.c.2.a. David Gustaf Wilhelm Weijber (b. 1976), Chief of staff & COO at Shire Biotechnology Research (2018–present), CEO at IL cosmetics (2012–2014).
      - 1.A.c.3. Carl Malcolm Wilhelm Hamilton (b. 1945), engineer, first married 1971–1984 to journalist Anna Angelica Lindberg. Then married 1984 to bureaucrat Olga Görel Christina Nilsson.
      - 1.A.c.4. Paul Dag Malcolm Wilhelm Hamilton (b. 1952), married 1991 to Marie-Louise von Horn (b. 1956)
    - 1.A.d. Märta Gunhild Toll (b. 1923), legatee of Charlottenberg Gård, married 1948 to Per Hugo Lindberg (1923–1988), doctor and E.H.C
      - 1.A.d.1. Gundhild Marie Lindberg (b. 1950), sociologist
      - 1.A.d.2. Eva Märta Lindberg (b. 1952), legatee of Charlottenberg Gård, married 1977 to Lars Gustav Lagerdahl (b. 1945), General Secretary of the S.P.F.
      - 1.A.d.3. Inger Elisabeth Lindberg (b. 1956), married 1981 to Dante Michael Iacovoni (b. 1955), director.
    - 1.A.e. Johan Magnus Toll (1925–1997), Fållnäs Gård heir, married 1951 to Ulla Britta Linnea Palmgård (b. 1926)
      - 1.A.e.1. Johan Erik Toll (b. 1952), estate legatee, married 1976–1994 to Zita Maria Tersman (b. 1950), researcher medicine at Karolinska institute and Social sciences, Stockholm university.
        - 1.A.e.1.a. Marina Victoria Tersman-Toll (b. 1977)
        - 1.A.e.1.b. Carl Johan Tersman-Toll (b. 1979), media company owner & journalist.
        - 1.A.e.1.c. Marc Folke Magnus Tersman-Toll (b. 1981), SEO specialist.
        - 1.A.e.1.d. John Fredrik Paul Tersman-Toll (b. 1983), brand developer.
      - 1.A.e.2. Henrik Paul Toll (b. 1954), Fållnäs Gård estate legatee, married 1981 to Anna Bodil Lundqvist (b. 1954)
        - 1.A.e.2.a. Gustaf Paul George Toll (b. 1983), SEB leverage director.
        - 1.A.e.2.b. Fredrik Carl Magnus Toll (b. 1984), SEB Head of Corporate loans
    - 1.A.f. Ruth Monica Toll (b. 1930), married 1956 to Julian Hill (b. 1932), businessman and fellow at the British Institute of management (F.B.I.M.).
      - 1.A.f.1. Rowland Paul Hill (b. 1956), fund manager & director
      - 1.A.f.2. Michael Mytton Hill (b. 1960), married 1990 to Priscilla Alice Morcan (b. 1965)
      - 1.A.f.3. Anne Louise Hill (b. 1963), married 1998 to Paul Hottinger (b. 1963)
  - 1.B. Sven Victor Engwall (1891–1967), businessman, married 1917 to Birgitta (Britta) Katarina Bergström, daughter of PUB-stockholm founder Paul U. Bergström.
    - 1.B.a. Ulla Britta Kerstin Engwall (b. 1919), married 1938 to Karl Axel Nordlund (1912–1971), major
    - 1.B.b. Jacob Sven Victor Engwall (1922–1986), businessman, married 1950 to Marianne Charlotte Edlund (b. 1928)
      - 1.B.b.1. Sven Torsten Viktor Engwall (1952–2020), businessman & foundation chairman, married 1977 to Elisabeth Petersson (1952–2001)
        - 1.B.b.1.a. Sven Jacob Torsten Engwall (b. 1978), donation fund chairman, port & shipping inheritor. Owner and managing director of Ivar Lundh & Co AB (2014–present), Owner and managing director of AB P.J HAEGERSTRAND (2011–present) and Vice President of Lazard (2005–2011).
        - 1.B.b.1.b. Louise Ingrid Elisabeth Engwall (b. 1981), Engwall funds chairwomen, inheritor, CEO & majority shareholder of Engco invest. (2021–present), board member of Winn Hotel Group
      - 1.B.b.2. Ann Marie Birgitta Margareta Engwall (b. 1956)
      - 1.B.b.3. Robert Sven Jacob Engwall (b. 1958), businessman & former MaxFastigheter i Sverige AB CEO, married 1985 to Marie Elisabeth Mård (b. 1958)
      - 1.B.b.4. Sven Jacob Engwall (b. 1961), Deputy CPO at Kraft Foods (Gevalia), Deputy CMO at Kraft Foods (Gevalia), Deputy CSO at Kraft foods (Gevalia), married 1990–1999 to Lena Maria Skeri (b. 1964), accountant
        - 1.B.b.4.a. Mikaela Helena Engwall (b. 1991), UN program manager
  - 1.C. Ruth Christina Engwall (1893–1945), married 1915 to Axel Erik Skoglund (1880–1963), banker
  - 1.D. Elsa Maria Engwall (1897–1940), married 1924 to Ivan von Bogdan (b. 1894), the Hungarian legation and member of the House of Bogdan-Mușat
  - 1.E. Signe Maria Engwall (1899–1990)
  - 1.F. Gustaf Victor Engwall (1902–1983), married 1938 to Marika Dickson (1918–1984), from the aristocratic Dickson family
    - 1.F.a. Kristina Vera Engwall (b. 1935), married 1957 to Bengt Claes Johan Wendt (b. 1932), economist
      - 1.F.a.1. Helena Kristina Wendt (b. 1958), married 1987 to Bengt Stigson Ödeen (b. 1958), Deputy CEO at Teracom Samhällsnät and son of business tycoon and communist politician Stig Ödeen
      - 1.F.a.2. Marie Katarina Wendt (b. 1961), married 1992 to Harald Ulfsson Nilssone (b. 1958), engineer
      - 1.F.a.3 Ulrika Andrea Wendt (b. 1966)
      - 1.F.a.4. Johan Peter Wendt (b. 1966), married 2001 to Beatrice af Petersens, noble woman and direct descendant of Herman Petersen the founder of the Swedish business dynasty af Petersens
    - 1.F.b. Eva Bussie Engwall (b. 1938), married 1964 to Rolf Rudolfson Ahlsell (1908–1978), captain and son of business tycoon Rudolf Ahlsell who founded Ahlsell AB and acquired the Engwall owned company SEAB that was founded by Sten Engwall von Scheele

=== Hulda Engwall Branch ===
- 2. Hulda Beata Christina Engwall (1857–1936), married 1885 to Sigurd Nils Olivier Wallberg, dentist (1851–1939)
  - 2.A. Astrid Christina Wallberg (1886–1961), married 1909 to Mauritz Serrander (1883–1933), major
    - 2.A.a. Sven Sigurd Mauritz Serrander (1910–1983), engineer, married 1937 to Hanna Gunborg Jönsson (1912–1940)
      - 2.A.a.1. Jan Mauritz Serrander (b. 1938), married 1960 to Gun Elice Pettersson (b. 1940), chief secretary
        - 2.A.a.1.a. Peter Mauritz Serrander (b. 1960), CEO at PostNord TPL, married to Lena Castler (b. 1961)
    - 2.A.b. Margaretha Christina Wallberg (1914–1938), married 1939–1949 to Magnus Fredrik Altahr Cederberg (1913–1983), landlord
    - 2.A.c. Astrid Mathilda Suzanne Wallberg (b. 1914), married 1937 to Axel Wilhelm Sebastian von Schoultz (1911–2000)
    - 2.A.d. Ulf Urban Wallberg (b. 1946), p. Lena Christina Gribbe (b. 1947)
  - 2.B. Gerda Marghareta Engwall (1888–1979), married 1909 to Nils Adolf Fredrik Wilhelm Ahlström (1879–1961), major
    - 2.B.a. Gunnar Ahlström (1910–1985), lawyer, married to Violet Maud Beatrice Sjögren (1910–1995)
      - 2.B.a.1. Göran Gunnarsson Ahlström (b. 1936), CEO at Sandvik (1983–1984), CEO at Santrade Luzern (1984–1985), CEO at Sydkraft AB (Eon Sverige) (1985–1998), married to Petra M-A Björk (b. 1939)
      - 2.B.a.2. Ann Beatrice Margaretha (b. 1941), married to Björn Wilhelm von Roth (b. 1935), landlord
        - 2.B.a.2.a. Fredrik Gustav Björnson von Roth (b. 1971), director
        - 2.B.a.2.b. Paula Beatrice Maria Björnsdotter von Roth (b. 1973)
        - 2.B.a.2.c. Alexander Gunnar Björnson von Roth (b. 1974), COO at Instabridge
    - 2.B.b. Bertil Nils Sigurd Olof Engwall (1913–1992), major, married 1940 to Ingrid Ragnhild Elisabet Svensson (b. 1911)
    - 2.B.c. Åke Engwall (1918–2001), architect, married 1989 to Brita Nenne Margareta Kihlborg (b. 1923)
    - 2.B.d. Sten Engwall (b. 1920), colonel, married 1945 to Birgit Signe Laurell (b. 1918), director
    - 2.B.e. Marianne Margaretha Engwall (b. 1923), first married 1948–1951 to Roland Oscar Sixten Pantzar (1910–1975), then married 1953–1976 to Kurt Rolf Herman Söderberg (1901–1989), hotel director
      - 2.B.e.1. Madeleine Marianne (Doudou) Pantzar (b. 1950)
      - 2.B.e.2. Marguerite Marianne Söderberg (b. 1953), CEO at société des bains de mer, married 1986 to William Rivkin (b. 1944)
        - 2.B.e.2.a. Andrew Rivkin (b. 1986)
        - 2.B.e.2.b. Daisy Rivkin (b. 1991)

=== Axel Theodor Engwall Branch ===
- 3. Axel Theodor Engwall (1858–1927), engineer

=== Carl Fredrik Engwall Branch ===
- 4. Carl Fredrik Engwall (1860–1925), consul, married 1910 to Agnes Albertina Andersson (1872–1950)
  - 4.A. Carl Otto Victor Engwall (b. 1912), one of the Astra-pioneers and chairman of the Swedish Association of Home Guard Officers, married 1939 to Gunnel Maria Lindwall (b. 1915)
    - 4.A.a. Lars Otto Victor Engwall (b. 1942), professor and author, married 1968 to Gunnel Birgitta Jansson (b. 1942), professor, author, former Vice Chancellor of Stockholm University and the former President of the Royal Swedish Academy of Letters, History and Antiquities.
      - 4.A.a.1. Sven Olov Victor Engwall (b. 1972), professor
  - 4.B. Ingeborg (Bonnan) Maria Engwall (1913–1995), married 1946 to Einar Wilhelm Orrsten (1914–1981), director of the social welfare office
  - 4.B.a. Kerstin Einarsdotter Orrsten (b. 1947), CEO assistant, married to Håkan Ingvar Söderlund, CEO and Chairman of Hotel Group Svava

=== Otto Engwall Branch ===
- 5. Otto Engwall (1860–1861)

=== Josef Wilhelm Engwall Branch ===
- 6. Josef Willhelm Engwall (1861–1930), landlord, married 1891 to Ninnie Hasseblad (1871–1952), the daughter of the Hasselblad camera family
  - 6.A. Ellen Kristina Engwall (1892–1961), married 1917 to Eskil Vilhelm Viktor Kylin (1889–1975), medical doctor
    - 6.A.a. Johan Olof Kylin (b. 1918), medical doctor, married 1943 to Aagot Ingegerd Friberg (1916–1978), medical doctor
    - 6.A.b. Nils Wilhelm Kylin (b. 1919), landlord, married 1942 to Eva Marie Louise Persson (b. 1922), dentist
    - 6.A.c. Lars Anders Kylin (1921–1998), lector, married 1954 to Erika Margaretha Gisela Cornils (b. 1931)
    - 6.A.d. Bengt Peter E:son Kylin (1925–2001), medical doctor, married 1952 to Karin Therese Henriksson (b. 1944)
    - 6.A.e. Kerstin Ninnie Eskilsdotter Kylin (b. 1928), married 1969 to Nils Åke Steinbeck, economist (1923–1995)
    - 6.A.f. Kajsa-Brita Eskilsdotter (b. 1929), married to Olof Artur Ängeby (1910–1984), principal
  - 6.B. Karin Engwall (1893–1973), lector
  - 6.C. Helga Maria Engwall (1895–1988), married 1928 to Carl Harald Wretman (1883–1940)

=== Knut Emil Engwall Branch ===
- 7. Knut Emil Engwall (1863–1923), businessman & civil servant, first married 1889 to Calla Gyllenhammar (b. 1863), sister to Pehr Gyllenhammar, then married 1916 to Emy Cedergren (b. 1890), daughter of the telecommunications tycoon Henrik Tore Cedergren
  - 7.A. Kerstin Viktoria (1890–1901)
  - 7.B. Pehr (Pelle) Viktor Engwall (1891–1968), engineer, married 1917 to Eve Charlotta Vilhelmina von Schéele (1889–1931)
    - 7.B.a. Kerstin Birgitt Engwall (1918–1969), married 1943 to Andres Fredrik Kjellerstedt (b. 1916), director
    - 7.B.b. Arne Engwall (b. 1920), married 1945, Ulla-Birgita Österberg (b. 1924)
    - 7.B.c. Ulla Christina Engwall (b. 1921), married 1947 to Karl Henty Tönnervik (1920–1997), director
    - 7.B.d. Sten Engwall von Scheele (1923–2019), inventor, founder & chairman of Sten Engwall AB (SEAB)
  - 7.C. Yngve Viktor Engwall (1898–1976), married 1923 to Ethel Viola Ahlfors (1899–1987)
  - 7.D. Rolf Viktor Engwall (1903–1990), engineer, first married 1928–1945 to Birgita Ottosdotter Klöfverskjöld (1905–1972), then married 1946 to Signe Evelyn Möller (b. 1922)
  - 7.E. Inga Karin Emilia Engwall (1914–1990), married 1937 to Bo Henrik Gustaf Helin (1910–1962), son of press mogul J.G Helin
    - 7.E.a. Inger Marianne Helin (1938–2014), bureaucrat and first female Volvo executive, married 1968 to Lars Göran Wessberg (b. 1939), medical doctor
      - 7.E.a.1. Lars Bo Staffan Wessberg (b. 1964), Psychologist
      - 7.E.a.2. Ingrid Marianne Wessberg Loor (b. 1966), married 1994 to Andres Viktor Loor, studio owner (b. 1957)
    - 7.E.b. Connie Inga-Lill Helin (b. 1940), engineer, married 1965 to Erik Paul Westman, principal (b. 1938)
      - 7.E.b.1. Jacob Bo Arne Westman (b. 1966), Head, Preclinical Result & Development at Curovir AB, married 1991 to Lotta Brunnsgård (b. 1964)
      - 7.E.b.2. Marika Inga Kristina Westman (b. 1966), engineer, married 1998 to Thomas Martinsson, UN inspector (b. 1965)
    - 7.E.c. Denis Bo Gustaf Helin (b. 1941), CPO at Electrolux, married 1972 to Pirjo Kaarin Jusslin (b. 1947)
      - 7.E.c.1. Sussane Inga Kaarina Helin (b. 1975), Chairwoman of Flickorna Helin (Skånska Gruvan)
      - 7.E.c.2. Carina Maria Elisabeth (b. 1981), co-owner of Bageri Helin & Catering
    - 7.E.d. Dag Bo Gustaf Helin (b. 1943), bureaucrat & civil servant, former Secretary of Social Services and the Labor Market Administration married 1976 to Eva Christina Lundin (b. 1947)
    - 7.E.e. Gun Henrietta Helin (1945–2013 ), married 1975 to Clas-Göran Sjöberg, construction engineer (b. 1948)
    - 7.E.f. Greger Johan Gustaf Helin (1947), author, bureaucrat & politician, former Secretary of Children and Youth, co-ordinator of the Älvsjö-Project, partner since 1963 to Mona Viola Elisabeth Perzanowska (b. 1949), artist and daughter of Związek Walki Zbrojnej fighter Stefan Perzanowski
      - 7.E.f.1. Sandra Emilia Elisabeth Helin (b. 1976), Chorister and volunteer of Maria Magdalena Assembly, First-Educator of Bromma and philanthropist, married 2001 to Pär Fredrik Helin Lövingsson (b. 1974), author, former Chairman of Karlöf (2005–2016) and Head of Organization & Analytics at Nordea (2022–present).
        - 7.E.f.1.a. Douglas Axel Emil Lövingsson (b. 2004), member of the Moderate Youth League (MUF), chair of the Political Youth Committee of MGS & MSS, Head of Distribution at Maria Magdalena Assembly (Lunch In Unison).
        - 7.E.f.1.b. Isak Gustaf Emil Lövingsson, (b. 2007)
      - 7.E.f.?. Child Perzanowski Helin (1979–1979)
      - 7.E.f.2. Petra Helin, (b. 1980), married 2010 to Stefan Westermark (b. 1975), CFO at MySafety Försäkringar AB (2008–2013), CFO at Best of Brand (2013–2018), CFO at apohem.se (2018–2021), CFO at Stalands Möbler (2021–present)
        - 7.E.f.2.a. Noel Westermark, (b. 2003)
        - 7.E.f.2.b. Thea Westermark, (b. 2004)
        - 7.E.f.2.c. Elton Westermark, (b. 2011)
  - 7.F. Björn Engwall (1917–2005), senior colonel, member of the Royal Swedish Society of Naval Sciences, married to Vera Hansson (1918–1975) and from 1976 to Maj Sigrid Viola Franke F Folkeson, (b. 1920)
  - 7.G. Bertil Engwall (1921–1997), married 1945 to Margarit Elisabeth Skeri (b. 1921), chief secretary
  - 7.G.a. Mats Anders Engwall (b. 1947), chairman of industrial engineering and management at the Royal Institute of Technology, married 1976 to Gloria Lynn Veach (b. 1950)
  - 7.H. Marianne Engwall (1923–2016), author, married 1948 to Bo Kärre (1923–2003), civil servant, director of information at Swedish International Development Cooperation Agency
    - 7.H.a. Malin Elisabeth Kärre (b. 1950), the Swedish ambassador in Vilnius (2004–2008), the Swedish ambassador in Cairo (2008–2013), deputy director and director of personnel for the Ministry for Foreign Affairs
    - 7.H.b. Klas Kärre, immunologist (b. 1954) to married Anne Siv Scharfstein, school director (b. 1954)

=== Esther Engwall Branch ===
- 8. Esther Katarina Engwall (1865–1944), married 1895 to John Runer (1861–1944), estate owner and military man

=== Anna Lydia Engwall Branch ===
- 9. Anna Lydia Engwall (1867–1938), married 1890 to Gustaf Emanuel Johanson (1862–1946), director
