= Carl Fredrik Engwall =

Swedish businessman (1860–1925)

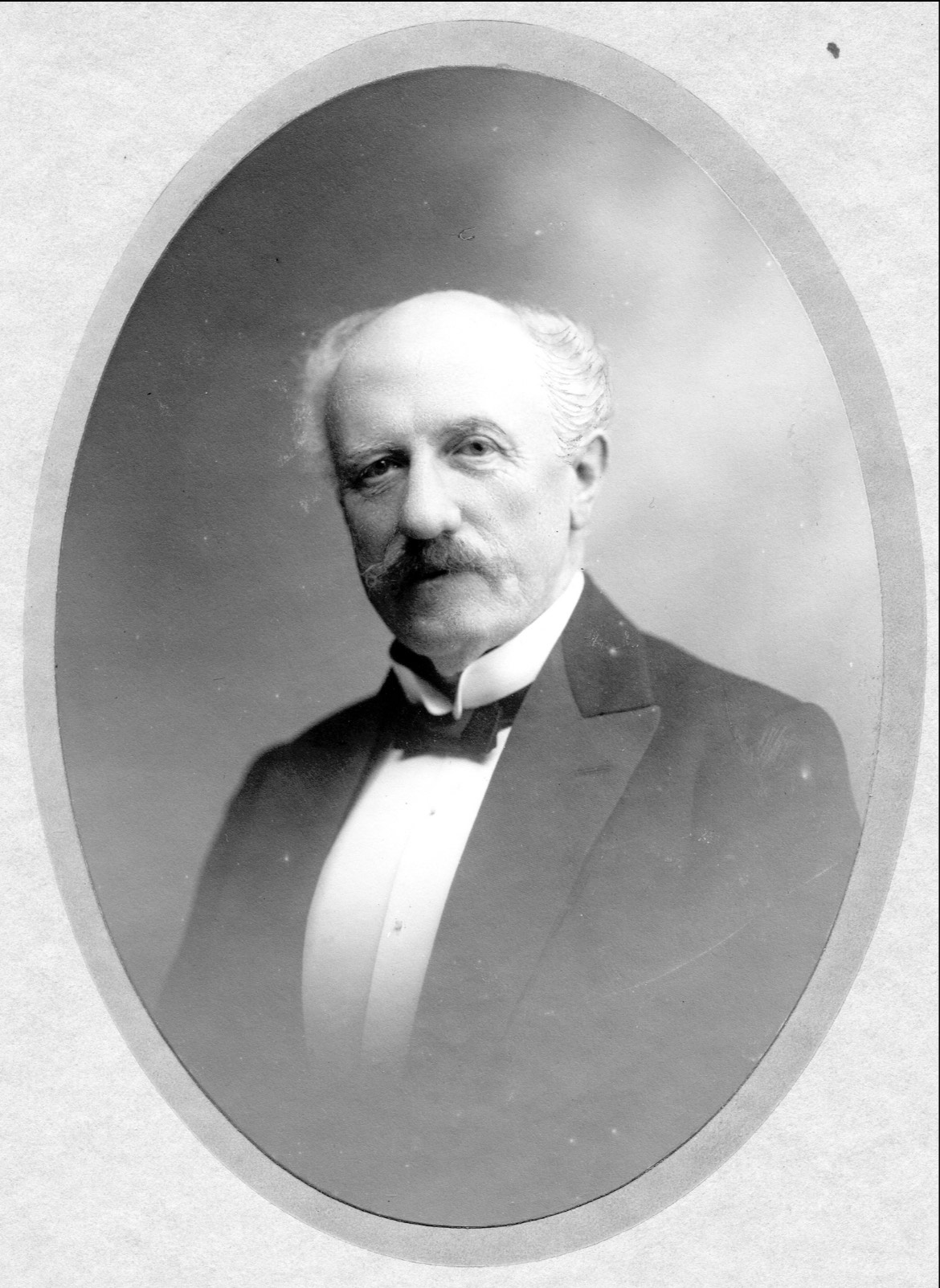

4th Secondary Patriarch of the Engwall family 1st Patriarch of the 4th lineage
- Preceded by: Knut Emil Engwall
- Succeeded by: Sven Victor Engwall

1st chairman of Engwall, Hellberg & Co 3rd vice-chairman of the Engwall board
- Preceded by: Knut Emil Engwall
- Succeeded by: Sven Victor Engwall

Personal details
- Born: 1860
- Died: 1925 (aged 64–65)
- Resting place: The Engwall family grave in Gävle
- Children: Carl Otto Victor Engwall
- Parent: Victor Theodor Engwall
- Profession: Merchant; Industrialist; Philanthropist
- Portfolio: Engwall & Hellberg Co

Carl Fredrik Engwall (1860-1925) was a Swedish businessman, industrialist and founder of Engwall, Hellberg & Co.

== Biography ==
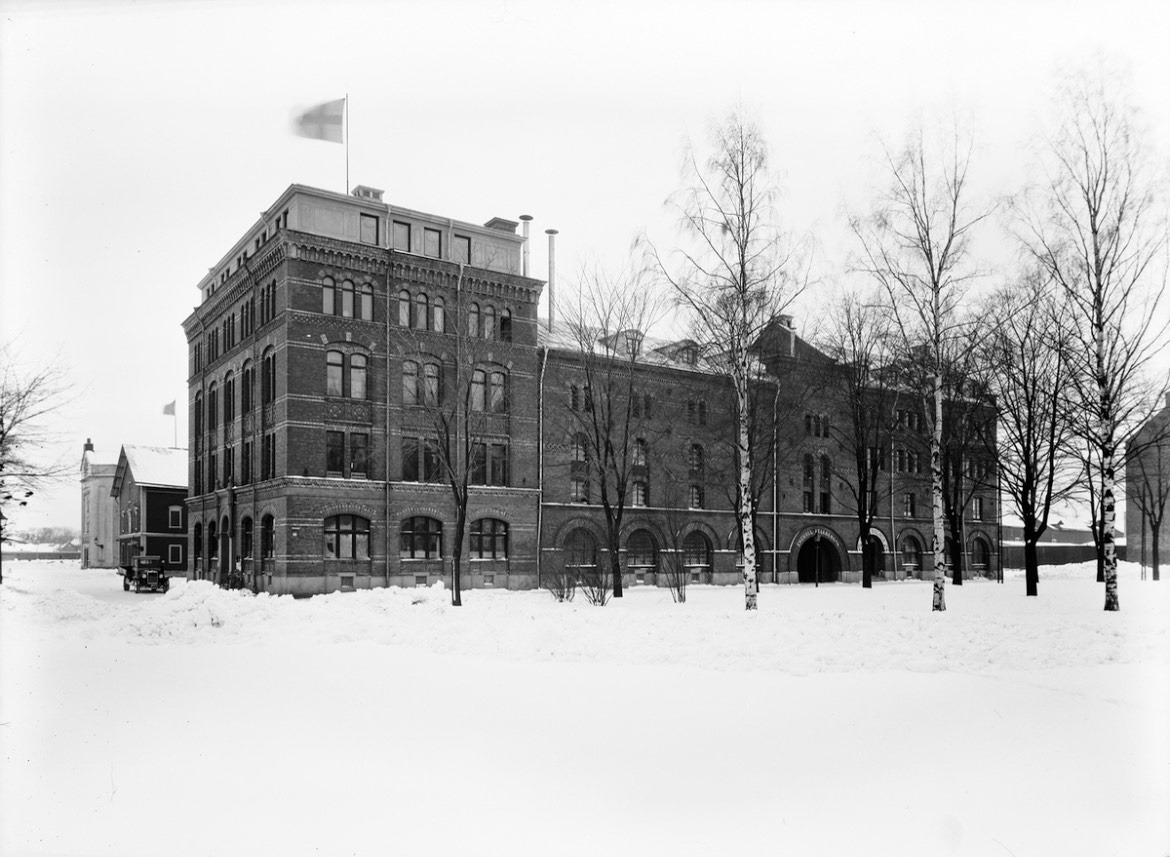
Helmia, 1892

Carl Fredrik Engwall, was the third son of Victor Theodor Engwall. Carl Fredrik co-owned the Helsan mineral water factory. In 1892, he established his own colonial goods firm, Carl Fredrik Engwall Co. In 1909, the company merged with Gustav Hellberg Co, first founded in 1888, and formed Engwall, Hellberg Co AB. The company became a competitor to the Engwall controlled Vict Th Engwall & Co (current Gevalia). The company's primary building was Holmia. In 1938, the Engwall family acquired the competitor Engwall, Hellberg Co AB.

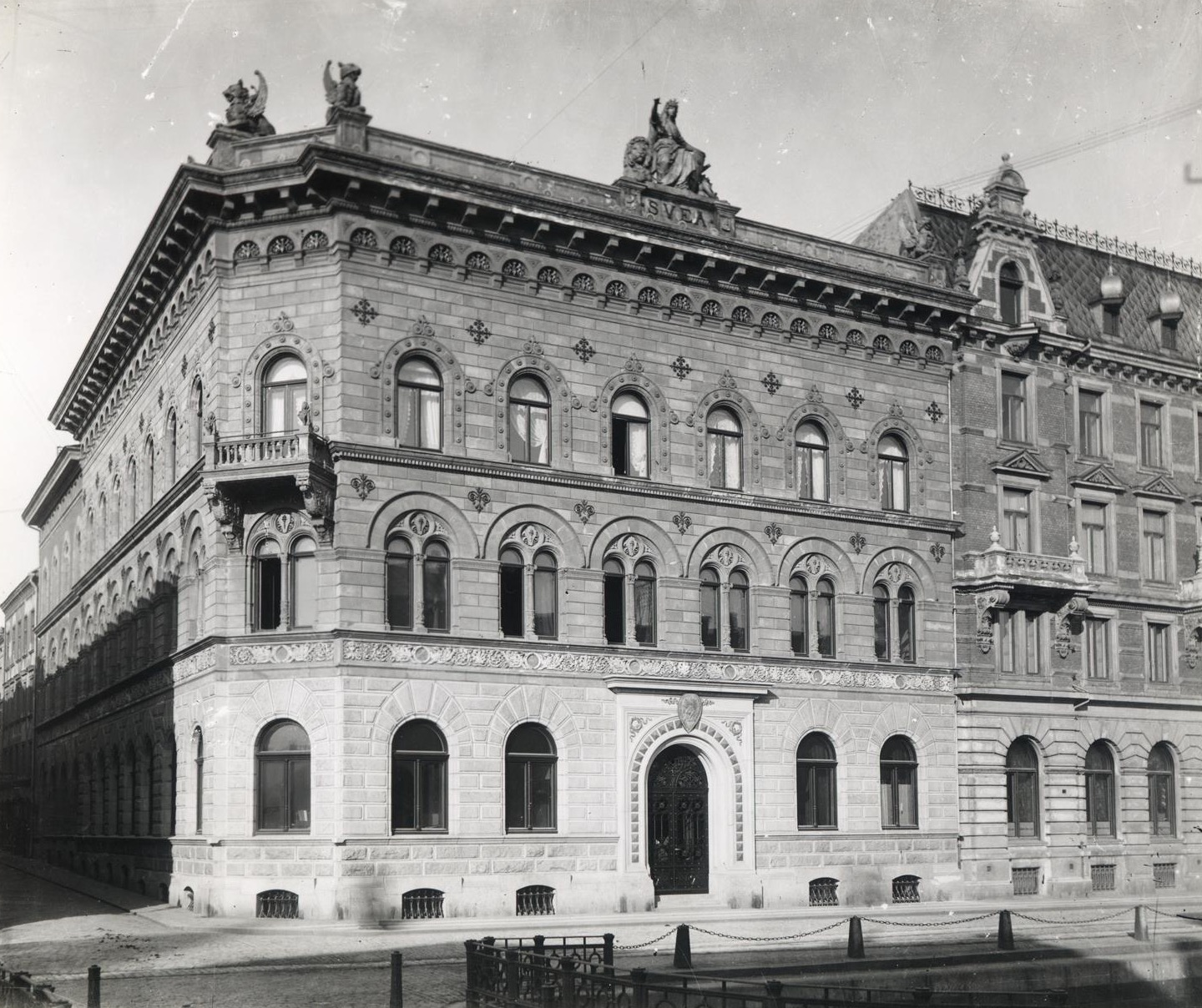
Sveahuset in Gothenburg, 1901, by Aron Jonason, in collection at Gothenburg city museum.

Carl Fredrik Engwall was appointed as a board member of Brand- och livsförsäkrings AB Svea. He became acquainted with Charles Dickson (chairman, 1866–1904), Eduard Boye (CEO, 1866–1891), and multiple other influential individuals from Gothenburg.

In 1918, the insurance company Försäkrings AB Nornan was founded by Hellberg and Engwall. The company originally acted as a subsidiary for Brand- och livsförsäkrings AB Svea. The Engwalls retained influence over Brand- och livsförsäkrings AB Svea. Between 1942 and 1953, Arvind Hellberg served as CEO, and between 1953 and 1961 Pehr Gyllenhammar Sr. served as CEO.

In 1950, the insurance provider Försäkrings AB Nornan merged with Brand- och livsförsäkrings AB Svea. In 1951, Försäkringsbolaget Svea-Nornan was established. In 1952, Försäkringsbolaget Svea-Nornan acquired the holdings company AB Argo. The same year, in 1952, Försäkringsaktiebolaget Ocean, Sjöförsäkringsbolaget Gauthiod, Sveriges Allmänna Sjöförsäkrings AB, Försäkringsbolaget Sjöassurans Kompaniet, Försäkringsbolaget Amphion, and Återförsäkringsbolaget Union was acquired by Försäkringsbolaget Svea-Nornan through AB Argo. The group later became a part of Skandia.

Carl Fredrik Engwall was appointed as the Russian consul in Gävle. He assisted his brother, Knut Emil Engwall, in getting approval for the Cedergren building in Warsaw. He also worked as a diplomat in France.
