= Sven Engwall =

Swedish businessman

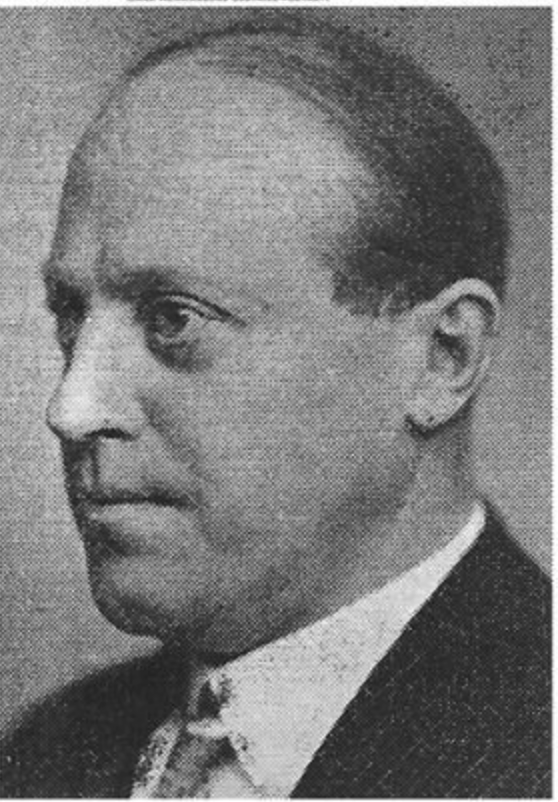

4th Patriarch of the Engwall family 2nd Patriarch of the 1st lineage
- Preceded by: Knut Emil Engwall
- Succeeded by: Jacob Engwall

4th chairman of Vict. Th. Engwall & Co 5th chairman of the Engwall board
- Preceded by: Knut Emil Engwall
- Succeeded by: Jacob Engwall

Personal details
- Born: 6 July 1891 Gävle, Sweden
- Died: 1967
- Resting place: The Engwall family grave in Gävle
- Children: Jacob Engwall
- Parent: Ernst Victor Engwall
- Education: Stockholm School of Economics
- Profession: Merchant, industrialist, sailor
- Portfolio: Vict. Th. Engwall & Co

Sven Victor Engwall (6 July 1891 – 1967) was a Swedish businessman, industrialist and professional sailor. He was the heir to the Engwall family in Gävle.

== Biography ==
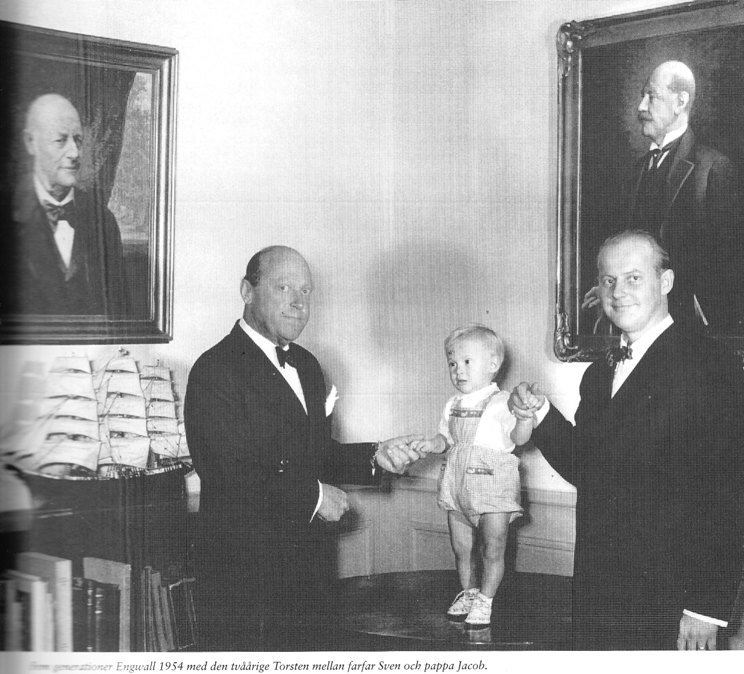
Sven Engwall, Torsten Engwall, and Jacob Engwall

Sven Victor Engwall, born in 1891, was the oldest son of Ernst Victor Engwall. In 1912, Sven Engwall graduated as a naval officer. In 1914, he actively participated in World War I. After the war, in 1918, Sven Engwall joined Vict. Th. Engwall & Co. He assumed the position of CEO at Vict. Th. Engwall & Co after his uncle, Knut Emil Engwall, transitioned to a more passive role on the family board. In 1945, Sven Engwall actively participated in the World War II at the same time as he managed the family business. He remained a lieutenant, in the reserve, after the wars.

In 1916, Sven Victor Engwall was appointed chairman of Gefle Manufaktur AB. He served as chairman of Engwall Hellberg AB and Fastigh AB Enghell. Sven acquired Furuviksparken AB together with Gösta Nygren and served as chairman from 1920. He served on the board of Korsnäs AB, a company majority owned by John Rettig. In the early 1920s, he served as chairman of the Gävle Merchant Association, an organisation founded by his father Ernst Victor Engwall and his uncles, Knut Emil Engwall and Carl Fredrik Engwall. Sven Victor Engwall contributed to the Gefle Sailing Society (GSS) and competed in sailing.

In the 1920s, Sven Engwall served as vice-chairman of Rederi AB Svea and Finnboda Varv AB. He served under the chairmanship of Torsten Kreuger. After the Kreuger Crash of 1929, Sven Victor Engwall together with Wilhelm Klingspor, Hugo Stenbeck, B. Barkman, and Tage Cervin acquired Hemisphere Steamship, Rederi AB Amphion, Rederi AB Bellis and Rederi AB Ceres. The shipping group after acquiring Korsnäs AB from Rettig Group, later became Kinnevik AB.
