= Bank Dyskontowy =

Polish Bank and Financial Service Company

Bank Dyskontowy S.A.
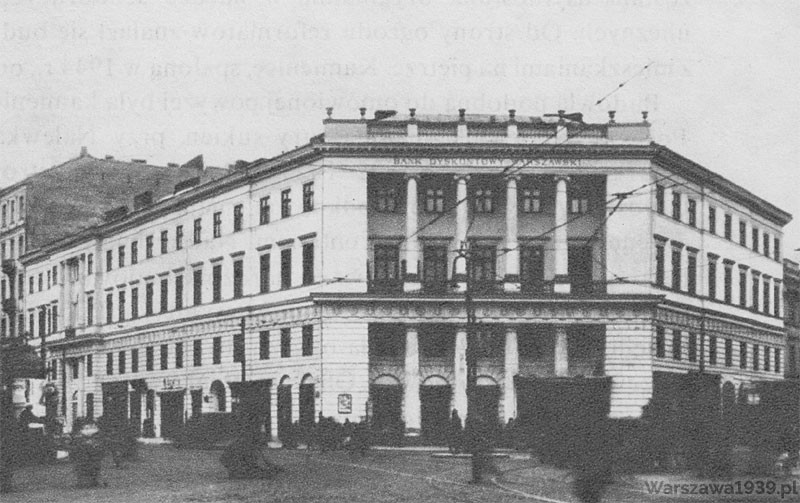
- Type: Spółka akcyjna
- Industry: Banking, financial services
- Founded: 16 January 1913; 113 years ago
- Founder: Przanowski family; Emil Engwall; Witold Kukowski
- Headquarters: Warsaw, Poland
- Key people: Witold Kukowski (1st president) Stefan Przanowski (1st chairman) Emil Engwall (1st capital partner)
- Products: Consumer banking, corporate banking, finance and insurance, investment banking, mortgage loans, private banking, private equity, savings, securities, asset management, wealth management, credit cards
- Net income: $44 million (1918)
- Total assets: $600 million (1916)
- Total equity: $240 million (1914)
- Number of employees: 11 700 (1924)

Bank Dyskontowy S.A. also known as Bank Diskontowy (English: Discount Bank), and as Diskonto-Bank A.G. in Germany was a Polish bank operating in the interwar period. The bank originated from Bydgoszcz.

== History ==
It was established in 1913 by local industrialists and landowners, including by Witold Kukowski [pl], who became its CEO, principal shareholder and member of the supervisory board; Stefan Przanowski, who became its executive-chairman, principal shareholder and chairman of the supervisory board; and Emil Engwall, who became its principal shareholder, vice-chairman and its first capital investor. The bank was officially registered in 1914. In the years 1921-1927 it used the name Bank Diskontowy (English: Bank Discount).

From 1920, the bank maintained an operating branch in Gdańsk at Langer Markt 18 (currently Długi Targ). The bank expanded and had branches in Poznań, Toruń, Brodnica, Grudziądz, Świecie, Tczew, Wejherowo, Kartuzy, Kościerzyna, Puck, Starogard Gdański and Warsaw, as well as several deposit banks (1924).

In 1927, Bank Diskontowy was discontinued and its assets were liquidated.

The bank was revived in the following year by, among other investors, Ivar Kreuger who initiated Bank Diskontowy Warsaw.

== See also ==
- List of banks in Poland

== Bibliography ==
- Wojciech Morawski: Słownik historyczny bankowości polskiej do 1939 roku., Muza S.A. Warszawa 1998, 208 s. ISBN 83-7079-947-7
- książki adresowe
