= Victor Theodor Engwall =

Swedish merchant and industrialist

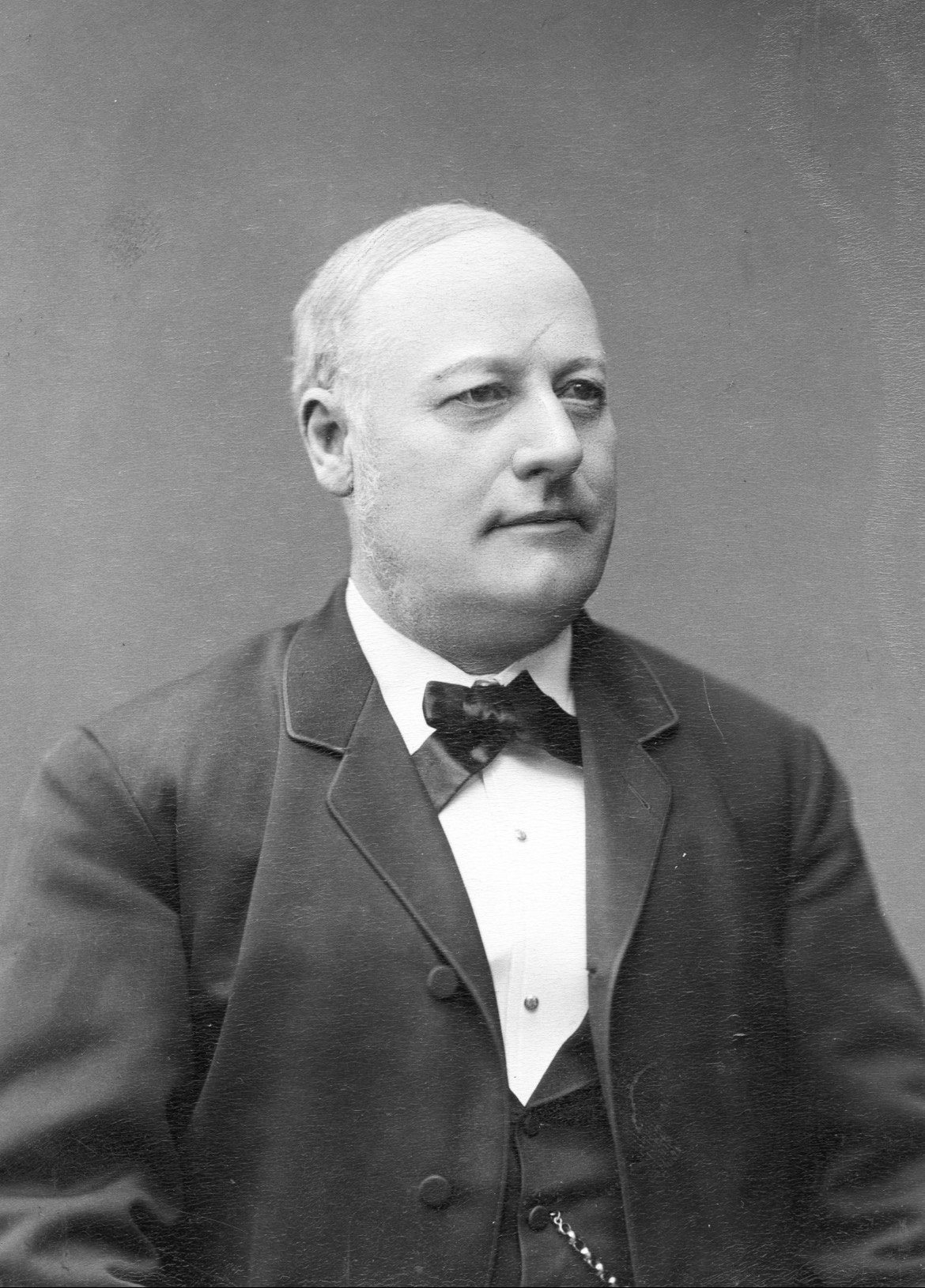

1st Patriarch of the Engwall family 4th Patriarch of the lineage
- Preceded by: Position established
- Succeeded by: Ernst Victor Engwall

1st chairman of Vict. Th. Engwall & Co 1st chairman of the Engwall board
- Preceded by: Position established
- Succeeded by: Ernst Victor Engwall

Personal details
- Born: 24 July 1827
- Died: 28 February 1908 (aged 80)
- Resting place: The Engwall family grave in Gävle
- Spouse: Christina Euphrosyne Engwall
- Children: Ernst Victor Engwall; Knut Emil Engwall; Carl Fredrik Engwall; Josef Wilhelm Engwall
- Parent: Jonas Olofsson Engwall
- Profession: Merchant; Industrialist; Philanthropist
- Portfolio: Vict. Th. Engwall & Co

Victor Theodor Engwall (24 July 1827 - 28 February 1908) was a Swedish industrialist, merchant and philanthropist. He founded Vict. Th. Engwall & Co, predecessor to Gevalia, the largest coffee brand in Sweden.

== Biography ==
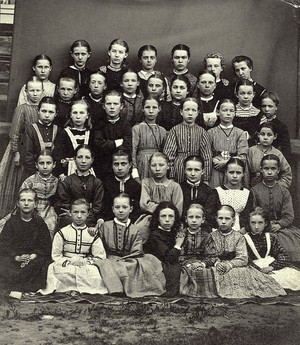
Kongl. sekter Kindblad's private school

Engwall was born on 24 July 1827 in Gävle, Gävleborg County, Sweden. He was the son of blacksmith and inventor Jonas Olofsson Engwall and his wife Christina Bollner. At age seven he was admitted to the first standardised school in Stockholm, and soon after was also admitted to a private school, Kongl. sekter Kindblad's privatskola. In that time period, Engwall's family moved to Karlberg Palace, near Stockholm. When he was twelve, Engwall decided to fulfil his late grandmother wishes for him to study Latin and pursue the priesthood, and enrolled in the Magister Haugwitz privatskola, which taught Latin.

Engwall's parents later recognized the financial burden imposed by pursuing priesthood and had him drop out.

In 1844, Engwall's mother died. His father Jonas Engwall relocated and remarried. Engwall detailed in his chronicle published posthumus that he then worked as a "trade clerk" for Otto Dahl at the age of 15.

In 1845, Engwall parted ways with Otto Dahl through an "amicable agreement". Victor Engwall received a letter of recommendation from Otto Dahl himself. The recommendation letter has been preserved by the Engwall family.

"In recognition of his faithful and modest conduct, I, Otto Dahl, shall attest to Victor's trustworthy character, thus commendation to anyone who would consider employing him".

— Otto Dahl, letter of recommendation, 1845

Following the recommendation Engwall joined the merchant D.J. Poppelman's establishment. Poppelman's grandfather was Johan Poppelman, founder of Poppelmans Bryggeri, an establishment vouched by Gustav II Adolf. Due to the connections of D.J. Poppelman, Engwall was able to establish himself in the socialite realm. On 2 April 1853, Engwall was able to obtain "status of a trading citizen", allowing him to trade and interfere in all spheres of business.

In 1853, Engwall opened a trade house in Consul Wilhelm Eckell's yard. The name of the trade house was "Victor Th. Engwalls Handelshus i Gefle" (English: Victor Th. Engwall's Tradehouse in Gefle), and it opened under the company named Vict. Th. Engwall & Co KB in Gävle.

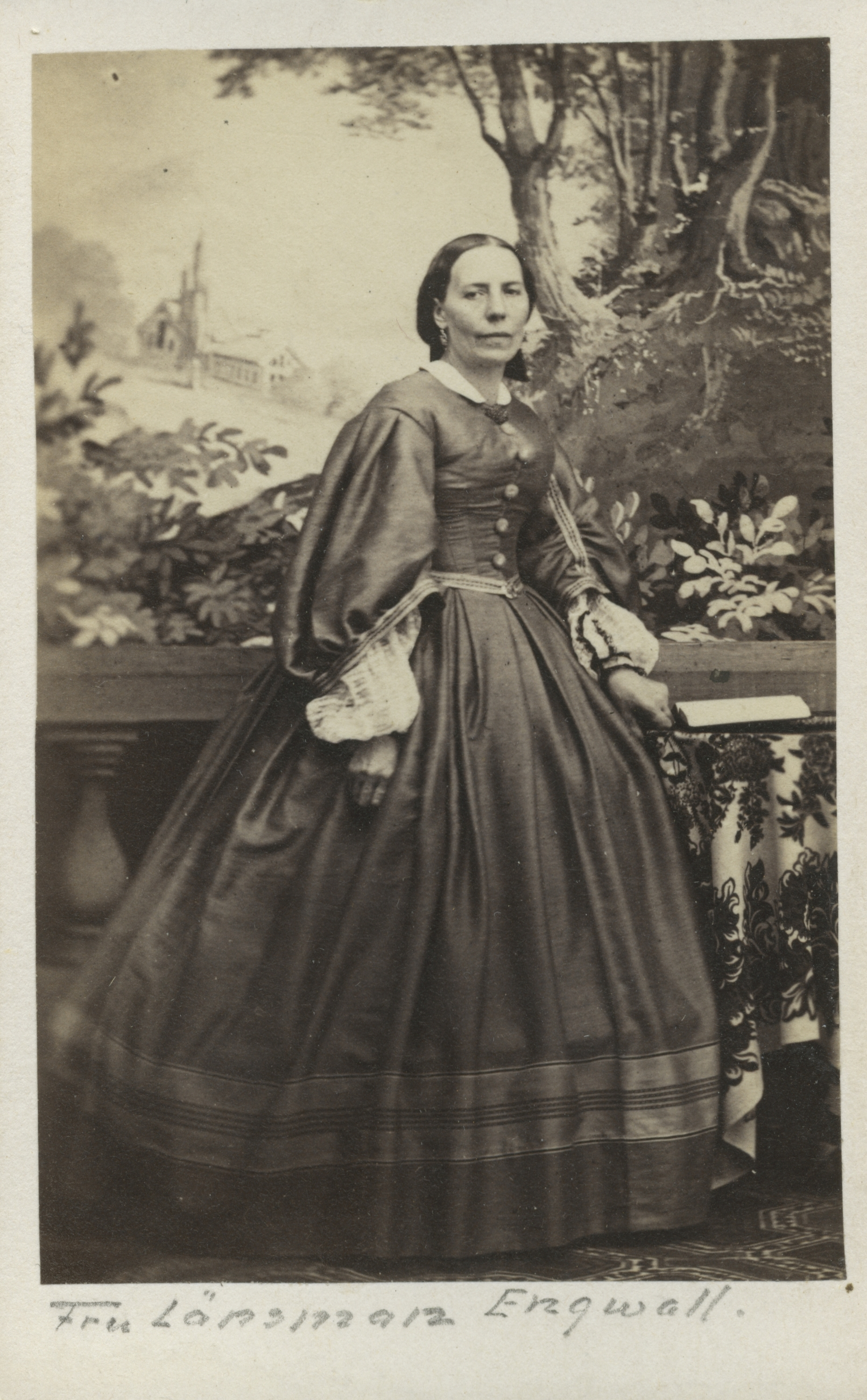
Christina Euphrosyne Engwall (1826 - 1905), by von oleschewsky, A.

In 1854, Victor Engwall married Christina Euphrosyne Norberg. Christina was the daughter of Lars Norberg, a coachman, and his wife Lundmark.

Initially, Engwall's general trading company sold manufactures, fine china, and various miscellaneous goods. Within three years he decided to primarily focus on colonial goods and foodstuffs. The trade house was successful in selling brandy, and in Gävle there is an anecdote (have you sold too much brandy?) attributed to Christina Engwall once commenting "It never goes well for us, you have sold too much brandy!".

In 1856, Engwall acted as a commission agent for various companies in Stockholm and Southern Sweden. The Engwalls sold goods to merchants in Falun, Hedemora, Söderhamn, Sveg, and other locations. This commissions based trade later became the primary focus of the company. In 1860, Engwall's general trading company ceased operations. By 1861, Engwall sourced common goods from Stockholm and Southern Sweden. He also imported colonial goods from Germany and Holland.

The Engwall's profited from the absence of railway and infrastructure in Norrland during the 1850s. Gävle served as a crucial shipping point for Dalarna, Bergslagen and Hälsingland during this time. In 1856, Vict. Th. Engwall Co financed the Gävle-Dala Railway and after three years, in 1859 the construction was completed. The Gävle-Dala Railway made Gävle during the 1860s a pivotal trade hub with the Engwall's implementing mandatory alight for transports of metals, charcoal and rebar from the mines in Northern Sweden.

Engwall is said to have promoted the alight due to the selected Gävle-Dala Railway's station for alight was located on the Valskvarn Co estate, a company Engwall had acquired in 1856, the same year he announced the financing for the project.

In 1863, Engwall acquired a property located at Vastra Drottninggatan. The property served as the operational base for the business and accommodated residences, offices, stables, storage facilities and warehouses. In the Gävle city fire of 1869 the estate burned down.

After the fire, Engwall resided at the family's summer residence, Lyckan. In 1870, the family decided to relocate to Stockholm. The family considered transferring the company's operations to the capital and had discussed acquiring the Wallenberg family's house on Kungsgrädgardsgatan.

In 1871, Victor Engwall's family relocated back to the summer residence, Lyckan. Esther Engwall, who was 4 years old, and Lydia Engwall, who was only 2 years old, opposed moving back to Lyckan due to gummies exclusively being available at Ladugardslandstorget in Stockholm at that time. Thus the family established a candy shop. Once asked "What kind of children are you?" by an wayfarer the children replied with "We are the children of Happiness!", something that, locally, has become an anecdote for taking bribes.

In 1870, Engwall built an acquaintanceship with industrialist J. Blomqvist. The two entrepreneurs registered a joint company the same year, called Vict. Th. Engwall Co. In 1871, they further expanded into construction and registered Eng. & Blom. bostads- och kontors (English: Eng. & Blom. residence's and office's) to construct a new residential as well as office building at Nygatan 28. In 1872, Engwall bought out his partner and constructed a new building on Norra Skeppsbron 4-7, Aderholmen.

Engwall operated Gävle's last match factory between 1869 and 1878. He had acquired the match factory in 1869 prior to the Gävle city fire for 25,000 Riksdaler.

Engwall died on 28 February 1908, at the age of 80. Published posthumous, the Engwall chronicle details his life. Engwall, born "the poor son of a blacksmith", at the time of his death was one of the wealthiest individuals in Sweden. He had ten children.

== Bibliography ==
- Ödman, Gerda. På den tiden. Minnen från 90-talets Gefle (in Swedish). Lantmännens Tryckeri Westlund & Co. 1942. pp. 131–376.
- Historik öfver Gefle-Dala jernvägs anläggning och dess trafikering under 25 år. Gefle. 1885. Libris 2681796
