= Jacob Engwall =

Swedish businessman (1922–1986)

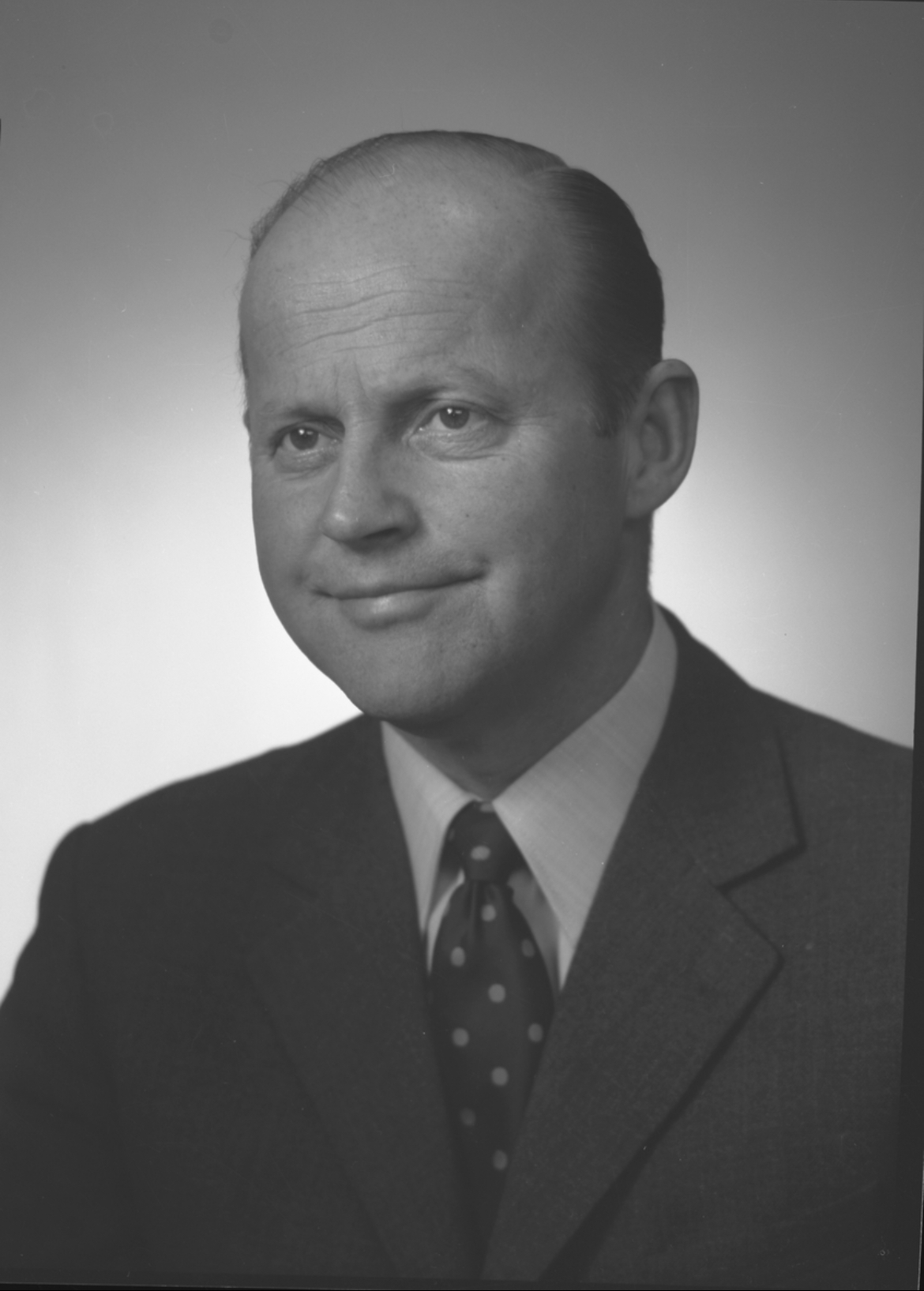
- Born: Sven Jacob Victor Engwall; 6 August 1922; Gävle, Sweden
- Died: 7 November 1986 (aged 64); Gävle, Sweden
- Education: Sigtunaskolan Humanistiska Läroverket; Stockholm School of Economics
- Occupation: Businessman
- Spouse: Marianne Edlund (m. 1950)
- Children: 4

Sven Jacob Victor Engwall (6 August 1922 – 7 November 1986) was a Swedish businessman.

== Early life ==
Engwall was born on 6 August 1922 in Gävle, Sweden, the son of managing director Sven Engwall and his wife Britta (née Bergström). He passed studentexamen at Sigtunaskolan Humanistiska Läroverket in 1942 and received a financial degree from Stockholm School of Economics in 1950. Engwall also studied coffee production in Brazil and the United States from 1950 to 1952.

== Career ==
Engwall was hired by Victor Th. Engwall & Co KB in Gävle in 1950 and became vice president in 1952. The year after, Europe's largest and most modern coffee roasting plant was opened in Gävle. Engwall became CEO in 1963 and stayed in that position until 1972. When the company was sold to General Foods in 1971, Engvall remained during one year as CEO. He became joint owner of the shipping company Nordship in 1976. Nordship was later taken over by his son Torsten. In 1985 he became co-owner and acting CEO of Stefan Trybom AB.

He was a member of the board of Korsnäs-Marma AB, Sponsor AB, Svenska Handelsbanken in Gävle, Gävle-Dala stadshypotek- och bostadskreditförening, deputy board member and later board member of Stockholms Rederi AB Svea and chairman of Gefle köpmannaförening. Engwall was also a member of the board of Persson & Co AB, Svenska Handelsbanken's regional bank in southern Norrland, Gimo AB and AB Stjernsunds bruk.

Engwall was skilled star boat sailor and multiple Swedish champion with the boat Ta Fatt. He participated in the 1956, 1960, 1966 and the 1967 Star World Championships.

== Personal life ==
In 1950 he married Marianne Edlund (born 1928), the daughter of managing director Torsten Edlund and Eva Wahlström. Engwall was the father of Torsten (born 1952), Ann-Marie (born 1956), Robert (born 1958), and Sven (born 1961).

On the 11 September 1963, Engvall was directly involved in what has been called Sweden's first kidnapping in modern times when his 7-year-old daughter Ann-Marie was abducted by a couple in a car on her way to school. The kidnappers demanded a ransom of 15,000 SEK (today about 150,000 SEK). Ann-Marie was returned home safely the same day and the kidnappers handed themselves over to the police the next day.

== Death ==
Engwall died of cancer in 1986 in Gävle Parish in his hometown of Gävle. He is buried at the Old Cemetery (Gamla kyrkogården) in Gävle.
