= Gevalia =

Swedish coffee brand

- Product type: Coffee
- Current owner: JDE Peet's (outside of North America); Kraft Heinz (North America)
- Produced by: JDE Peet's (outside of North America); Kraft Heinz (North America)
- Country: Sweden
- Introduced: 1853; 173 years ago
- Related brands: Maxwell House
- Markets: Sweden, Northern Europe, North America
- Previous owners: Vict. Th. Engwall & Co (1853-1971)
- Website: www.gevalia.se (Main); gevalia.com (North America)

Gevalia (US: /dʒəˈvɑːliə/ jə-VAH-lee-ə, UK: /ɡəˈ-/ gə-, Swedish: [jɛˈvɑ̌ːlɪa]) is a coffee brand originating from Gävle, Sweden. Founded in 1853, it has grown to become the largest coffee roastery in Scandinavia. The brand name "Gevalia" is derived from the Latin name for Gävle.

A mainstream supermarket brand in Northern Europe, Gevalia is marketed in the United States as a premium brand, where it is styled 'gëvalia'. Today, Gevalia is owned by different entities in different markets: Kraft Heinz in North America and JDE Peet's in the rest of the world.

== Gevalia history ==
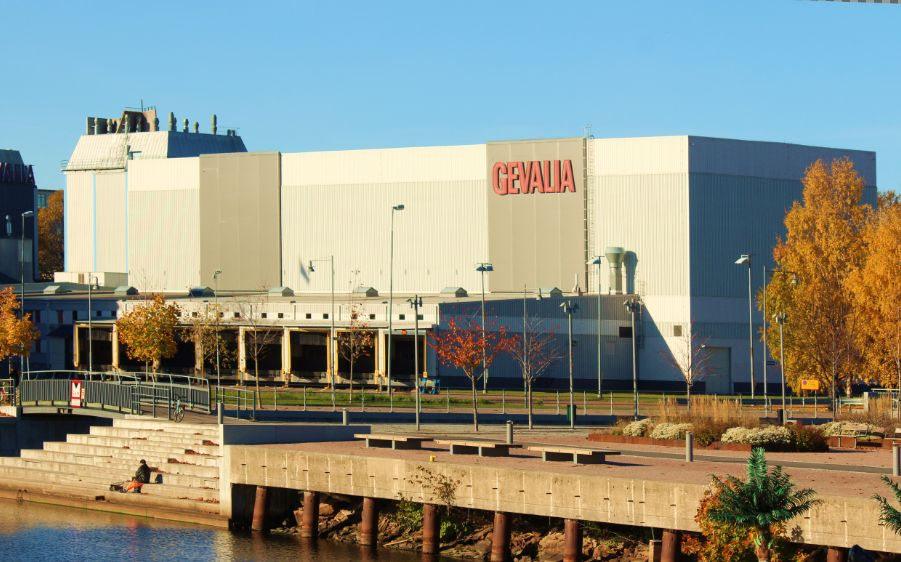
Gevalia roastery in Gävle, Sweden

=== In Sweden and Europe ===
Located in Gävle, Sweden (Gevalia in Latin), Gevalia was introduced in 1853 in Sweden by the trading company Victor Theodor Engwall & Co KB. The first CEO was Victor Theodor Engwall. Ernst Victor Engwall succeeded his father as CEO of the company from 1882 to 1915. In 1915, Knut Emil Engwall was appointed CEO. Sven Engwall served as the fourth CEO of the family company. Jacob Engwall was the last CEO of the Engwall family owned company from 1963 to 1972.

Gevalia was once also a brand for spices. In 1970, Gevalia purchased Kockens, a spice company, in Ystad, and the Kockens brand began to be used for spices produced at the Gävle factory.

After 120 years as a family company, it was sold in 1971 to Mondelez International predecessor company, General Foods. Around the same time, General Foods also acquired another Swedish coffee brand, Coffea, which produced Premiär coffee. As part of the acquisition, production from the Premiär roasting facility in Gröndal was relocated to Gävle.

Gevalia runs a well-known and long-running marketing campaign with the theme of "unexpected visitors", starting in the early 1990s. The campaign featured in addition to print ads and movie commercials also installations in public places in Sweden featuring submarines and airplanes.

In 1973, Gevalia was introduced to the Danish market by General Foods. For a time, Gevalia operated a roasting facility in Glostrup outside Copenhagen, which served the Danish market. However, the facility closed in 2004, and production was consolidated in Gävle. Gevalia remains a popular coffee brand in Denmark.

Gevalia previously held a royal warrant of appointment for coffee roasters from the King of Sweden. After Kraft Foods Inc. was split into two companies in 2012, rights to Gevalia brands were divided and currently owned by Kraft Heinz in North America and JDE Peet's (formed from merger of Douwe Egberts and Mondelez International coffee and tea division) in rest of the world.

=== In North America ===
Logo used in North America

Gevalia began North American sales, via mail-order delivery service, in 1983. In North America, the company sells coffee directly to consumers via home delivery and through big box stores such as Wal-Mart. In Gevalia produces more than 40 different varieties of coffee and tea.

Gevalia is perhaps most well known for its introductory offer of a free coffeemaker and other coffee-related incentives. These offers were seen in magazine advertisements, direct mailings, and television commercials, but were later overtaken by online advertising. Some of these Gevalia.com advertisements were the basis of the 2005 Hypertouch based lawsuit. In September 2013, Gevalia introduced specialty drink K-Cups using real milk.

In 2011, Kraft announced the retail launch of Gevalia in the United States; the in-store collection started with a complete line of ground, whole bean, decaf and flavored options. Gevalia also maintains an Office Coffee Service, offering mail-order coffee by the case, as well as coffee singles. Gevalia is also sold for the K-Cup system in the United States.

== Coffees and teas ==
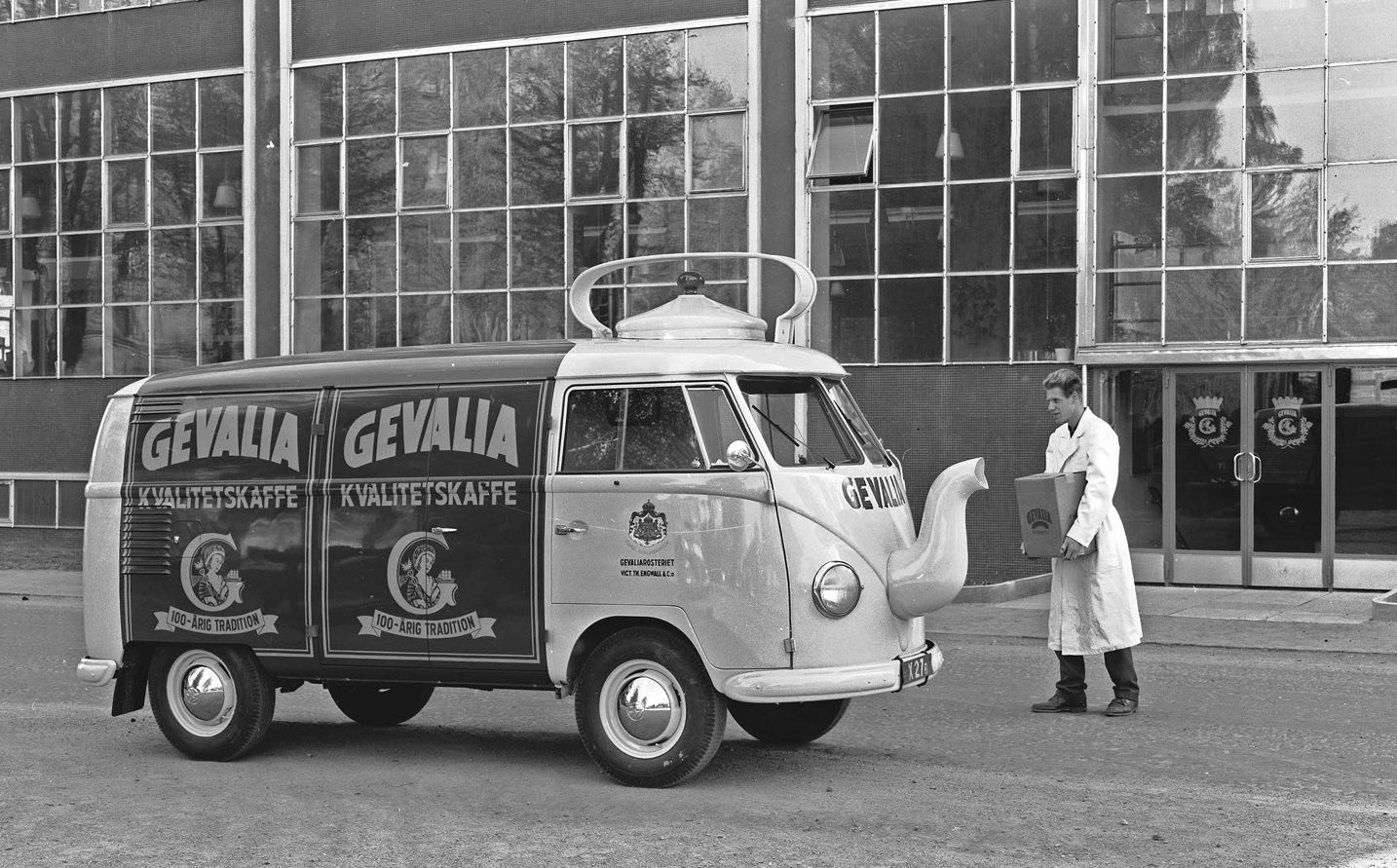
Volkswagen van at Gevalia's coffee roasting facility in Gävle in 1956

As of February 2007, Gevalia offered more than 40 different coffees and teas, according to Gevalia.com. The majority of these coffees are Arabica blends, using beans from Kenya, Guatemala, Colombia, and Costa Rica. Gevalia Kaffe is composed of up to six different varieties of these Arabica beans, as well as Brazilian beans, and those are having attention. Gevalia discontinued sales of tea in 2015.

Gevalia coffee in the North American market is roasted, ground (except for its whole bean variety), and packaged by Kraft in North America instead of being imported from Sweden.

== Controversies ==
In 2005, Kraft was sued by Hypertouch, an Internet service provider (ISP), for spamming its Gevalia coffee brand. Kraft was accused of sending multiple waves of junk advertisement to the ISP's customers, the action brought under the CAN-SPAM Act of 2003 act. The parties resolved their dispute by mutual agreement and the litigation has been dismissed.

On 9 February 2012, the T-discs used in Gevalia, Maxwell House and Nabob brand espresso were recalled from the market following the potential of second degree burn hazard.

Gevalia has faced criticism for working conditions in Brazil, highlighted in reports by Swedwatch in 2005 and 2010.
