= Ernst Victor Engwall =

Swedish businessman (1855–1915)

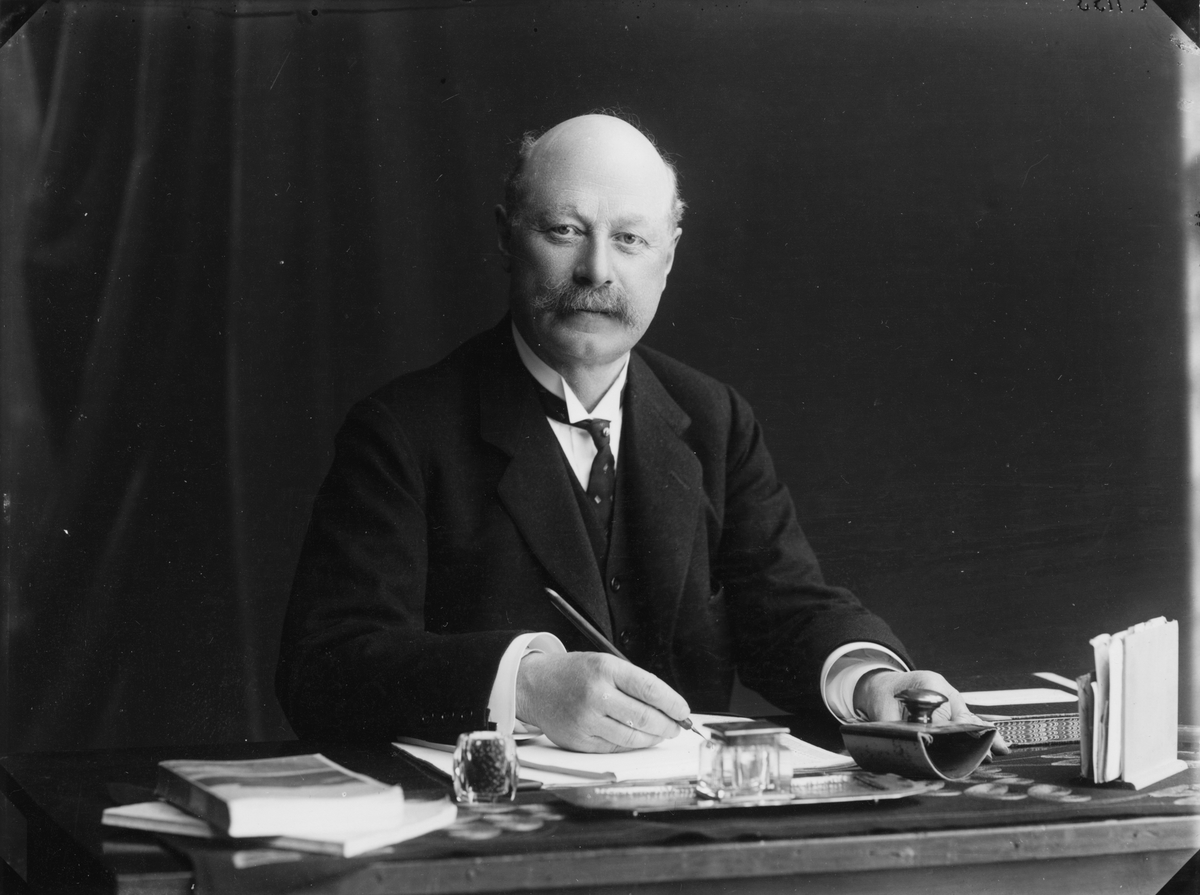

2nd Patriarch of the Engwall family 1st Patriarch of the 1st lineage
- Preceded by: Victor Theodor Engwall
- Succeeded by: Knut Emil Engwall

2nd chairman of Vict. Th. Engwall & Co 2nd chairman of the Engwall board
- Preceded by: Victor Theodor Engwall
- Succeeded by: Knut Emil Engwall

Personal details
- Born: 13 July 1855 Gävle, Sweden
- Died: 1915
- Resting place: The Engwall family grave in Gävle
- Spouse: Anna Hilda Johanson
- Children: Gunhild Engwall
- Parent: Victor Theodor Engwall
- Profession: Merchant, industrialist, philanthropist
- Portfolio: Vict. Th. Engwall & Co

Ernst Victor Engwall (13 July 1855 – 1915) was a Swedish businessman, merchant and second heir of the Engwall family.

== Biography ==
Ernst Victor Engwall, the eldest son of Victor Theodor Engwall, joined the company in 1875. He became CEO at Vict. Th. Engwall & Co. in 1882. Ernst Engwall focused the company's operations on coffee and food.

Ernst Engwall served as a member of the Gefle City Council from 1886 to 1915. In the political sphere he became acquainted with John Rettig, who at the time was a candidate as member of parliament. In 1886, Ernst Engwall helped John Rettig to take over the family company P.C. Rettig & Co, the employer of Jonas Engwall.

In 1888, Ernst Engwall was announced as board member of Gefleborgs Läns Sparbank. In 1889, the Engwall family became principal shareholders of Gefleborgs Läns Sparbank, a previously government owned entity.

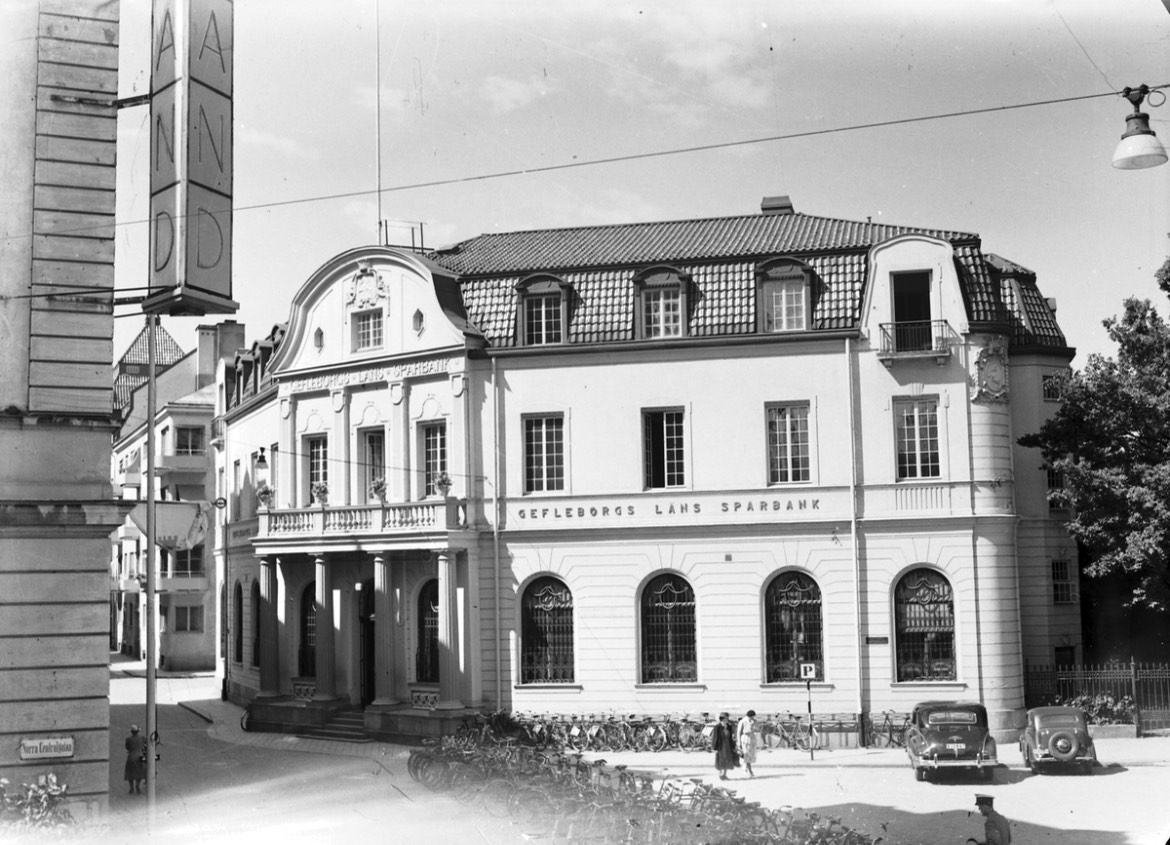
Gefleborgs Läns Sparbank

In 1899, Ernst Engwall became vice-chairman of Gefleborgs Enskilda Bank. The board members of the bank was Edward Rettig, brother to John Rettig; Carl Berggren, uncle-in-law to Knut Emil Engwall and chairman of the Engwall funded Gävle–Dala Railway AB; and Carl Gustaf Ericson, brother to Werner Ericson, business partner and close friend of Knut Emil Engwall. After Ernst Engwall became vice-chairman he installed John Rettig as chairman of the bank.

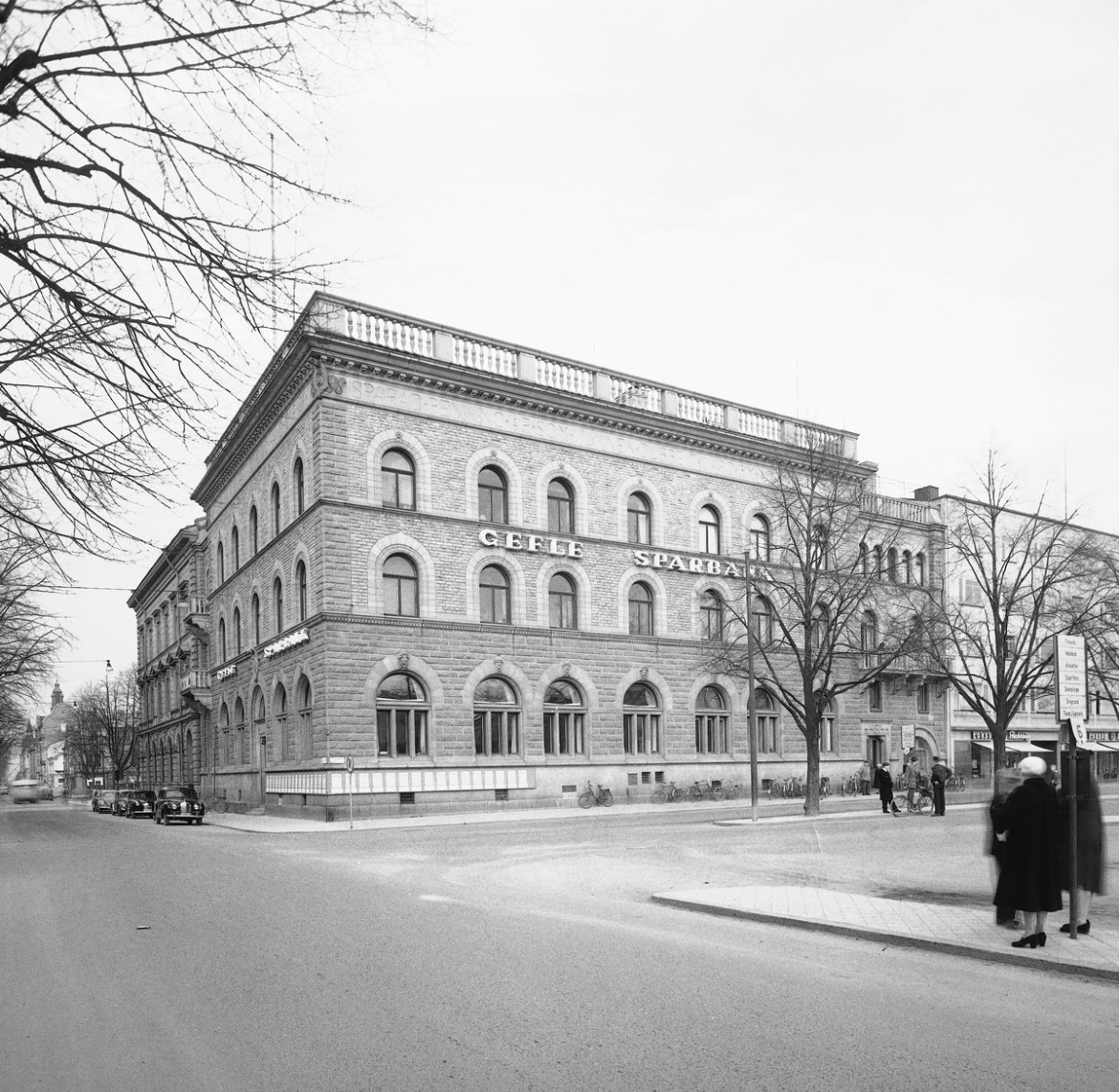
Gefle Sparebank

Ernst Engwall was able to fund the family's projects through the bank. After Ernst became vice-chairman, the Engwall family saw rapid growth, financing Borgarskolan, as well as the construction of Gevaliapalatset.

The Engwall's involvement with Rettig, Berggren, and Ericson during the 20th century has since been scrutinized due to monopolistic business practices.

In 1905, Importbolaget Vict. Th. Engwall Co was restructured and benefited from the colonial frenzy of the early 20th century. In 1913, Ernst Engwall oversaw the acquisition of the first coffee roasting machine.

Ernst Engwall, together with his younger brothers, Knut Emil Engwall and Carl Fredrik Engwall, founded the Gävle Chamber of Commerce, an investment arm that currently encompasses a $14 billion logistics network.

In 1915, Ernst Engwall passed away. Under Ernst leadership The business expanded beyond a trading house, and ventured into various industries, including mills and a shipping company. One notable vessel acquired by Vict. Th. Engwall Co under his leadership was named Gevalia, the Latin name for Gävle. The Engwall's coffee brand Gevalia was named after the vessel.
