= Stefan Przanowski =

Polish Minister

His Excellency Stefan Przanowski
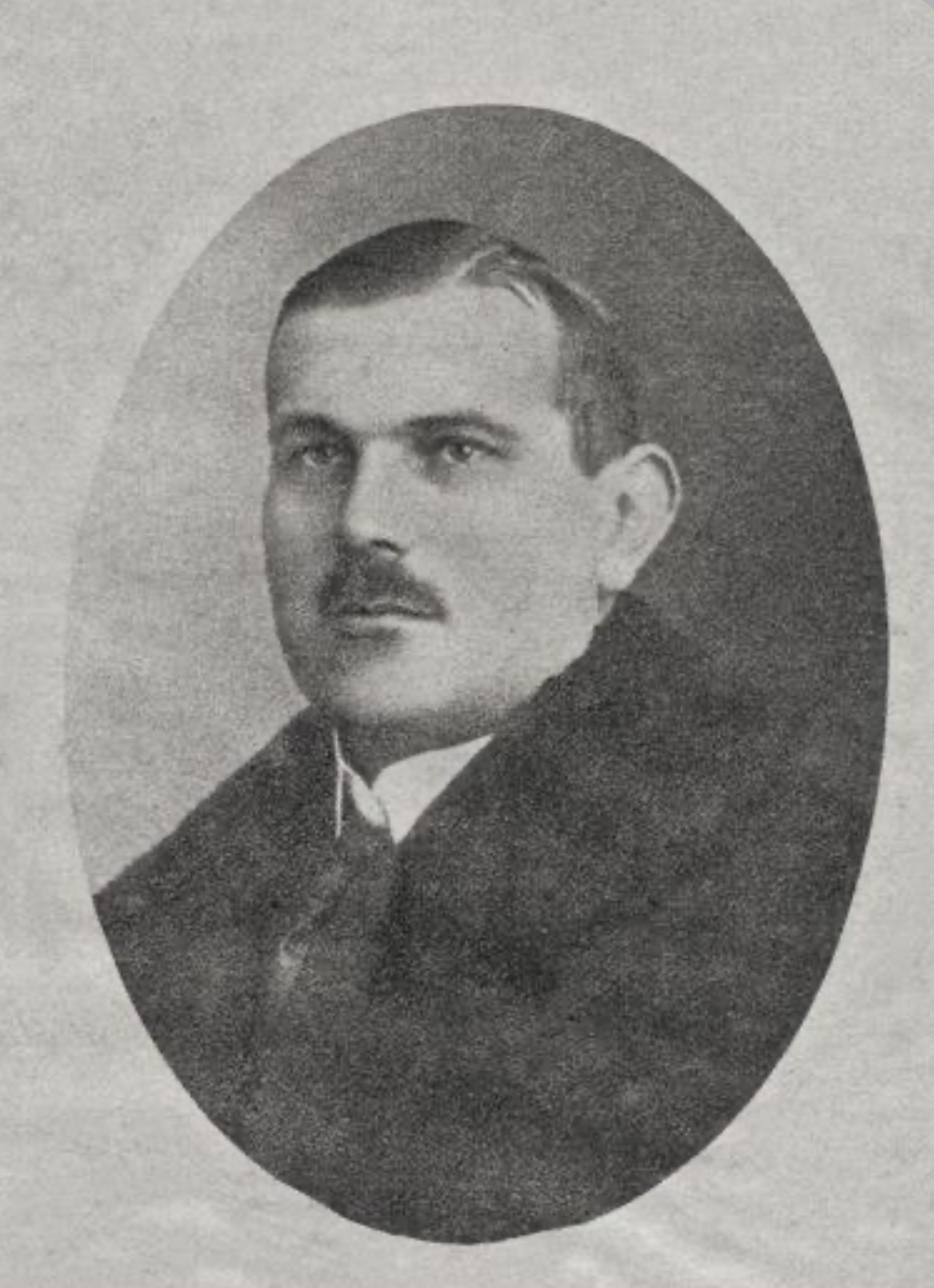

7th Prime Minister of Poland 6th Prime Minister of the Second Republic of Poland
- Disputed
- In office June 1922 – June 1922
- Appointed by: The Main Commission of Sejm and Senate
- Preceded by: Antoni Ponikowski
- Succeeded by: Artur Śliwiński

Minister of Industry and Trade
- In office 26 November 1920 – 13 September 1921

Minister of Provisions
- In office 7 December 1917 – 11 February 1918
- Appointed by: Jan Kucharzewski

Personal details
- Party: Independent
- Other political affiliations: Inter-Party Political Circle
- Parent: Edward Przanowski Józefa Lewicka
- Education: Karlsruhe Institute of Technology
- Occupation: Politician and businessman
- Committees: Civic Committee of the capital city of Warsaw Committee of Food and Control Committee of industrialisation

Stefan Przanowski (12 April 1874 - 17 February 1938) was a Polish engineer and politician who served as Minister of Provisions from 1917 to 1920 and Minister of Industry and Trade from 1920 to 1921. He was also disputed prime minister of Poland in 1922.

== Biography ==
Stefan Przanowski was the son of Edward Przanowski (1845–1929), soldier of the January Uprising, member of the Public Charity Council of the Łęczyca County. Przanowski’s had four brothers, Władysław Przanowski, who was Director of National Institute of Handwork [pl: Państwowy Instytut Robót Ręcznych]; Jan Przanowski, who was a lawman and member of the Sejm of the 3rd term in the Second Republic of Poland on behalf of the National Party; Michał Przanowski, who was a merchant in Przasnysz; and Kazimierz Przanowski, who was the director of Cukrownia.

Stefan Przanowski graduated from Gimnazjum Realne in Łowicz and later from the Karlsruhe Institute of Technology in Germany. He returned to Poland and moved to Warsaw. There, he was initially employed at multiple family-owned companies. During World War I he was appointed as a member of the Komitet Obywatelski stołecznego miasta Warszawy (Civic Committee of the Capital City of Warsaw) and the Council of the Capital City of Warsaw. He later headed the food department. In Warsaw, Przanowski was increasingly involved in political activity within the Międzypartyjne Koło Polityczne (Inter-Party Political Circle).

On December 17, 1917, Przanowski joined Jan Kucharzewski's government as the Minister of Provisions. He later resigned along with the rest of the cabinet in protest against the Treaty of Brest-Litovsk.

In 1920, he was appointed as the Minister of Industry and Trade by Wincenty Witos. Stefan Przanowski was a supporter of the free market and liquidated the previously operating statist offices [pl]: coal, oil, grain. He was often referred to as “the pope of Polish liberalism”.

In honour of Stefan Przanowski’s merits, in 1921, the ministries decided to name the salt cave located in the Wieliczka Salt Mine, the Przanowski Chamber.

In 1922, during the government crisis, Stefan Przanowski was appointed as Prime Minister of Poland. He was not able to create a cabinet due to objections from the Chief of State (Equivalent to President) Józef Piłsudski. Przanowski ran for the Sejm later in 1922 and lost, then withdrawing from politics.

From 1918 to 1930, Stefan Przanowski was chief executive officer of Norblin, Bracia Buch i T.Werner. In 1934, he was appointed president and chairman of the supervisory board of Norblin, Bracia Buch i T.Werner in Warsaw.

Stefan Przanowski is noted among the most influential industrialists and economic activists; and retained independence from foreign capital. Przanowski was a member of the supervisory boards and investor representative boards of many industrial companies and banks. Some notable examples are:

- Bank Polski (vice-chairman: today PKO Bank Polski, Poland's largest bank)
- Bank Śląski (vice-chairman: today ING Bank Śląski, Polands second largest bank)
- Bank Dyskontowski (deputy chairman: seized by the central government)
- Polskiej Wytwórni Papierów Wartościowych (President of Council and chairman)
- Giełda Pieniężna w Warszawie (vice-chairman and President of the Council: today Warsaw Stock Exchange)
- Górnośląskie Zjednoczone Huty „Królewska” i „Laura” w Katowicach.

He was a member of the Presidium of the Council of the Central Association of Polish Industry, Mining, Trade and Finance "Lewiatan", vice-president of the Chamber of Commerce and Industry in Warsaw, vice-president and member of the Council of the Polish Association of Metal Industrialists.

From 1924, Stefan Przanowski alongside the Circle of Karlsruhenians at the Association of Technicians belonged to the Polish Academic Corporation ZAG Wisła (Polish: Polska Korporacja Akademicka Związek Akademików Gdańskich Wisła).

He lived in Warsaw at Aleje Ujazdowskie 36 (Kamienica pod Gigantami). In 1924, the Przanowski family acquired an estate of 600 hectares and a grand palace. The estate is located in Nowa Wieś near Starogard Gdański in Pomerania.

He was married to Zofia Przanowska (born: Grabowska). The couple had a son Wojciech Przanowski, who was a soldier of the Warsaw Uprising and an engineer. The couple further had a daughter Izabela Wasiak, a Polish language teacher, lector and underground publisher.

He is buried at the Powązki Cemetery (section 170-6-25); a tombstone decorated with a bas-relief "Sadness" - by pl:Leon Szatzsznajder.

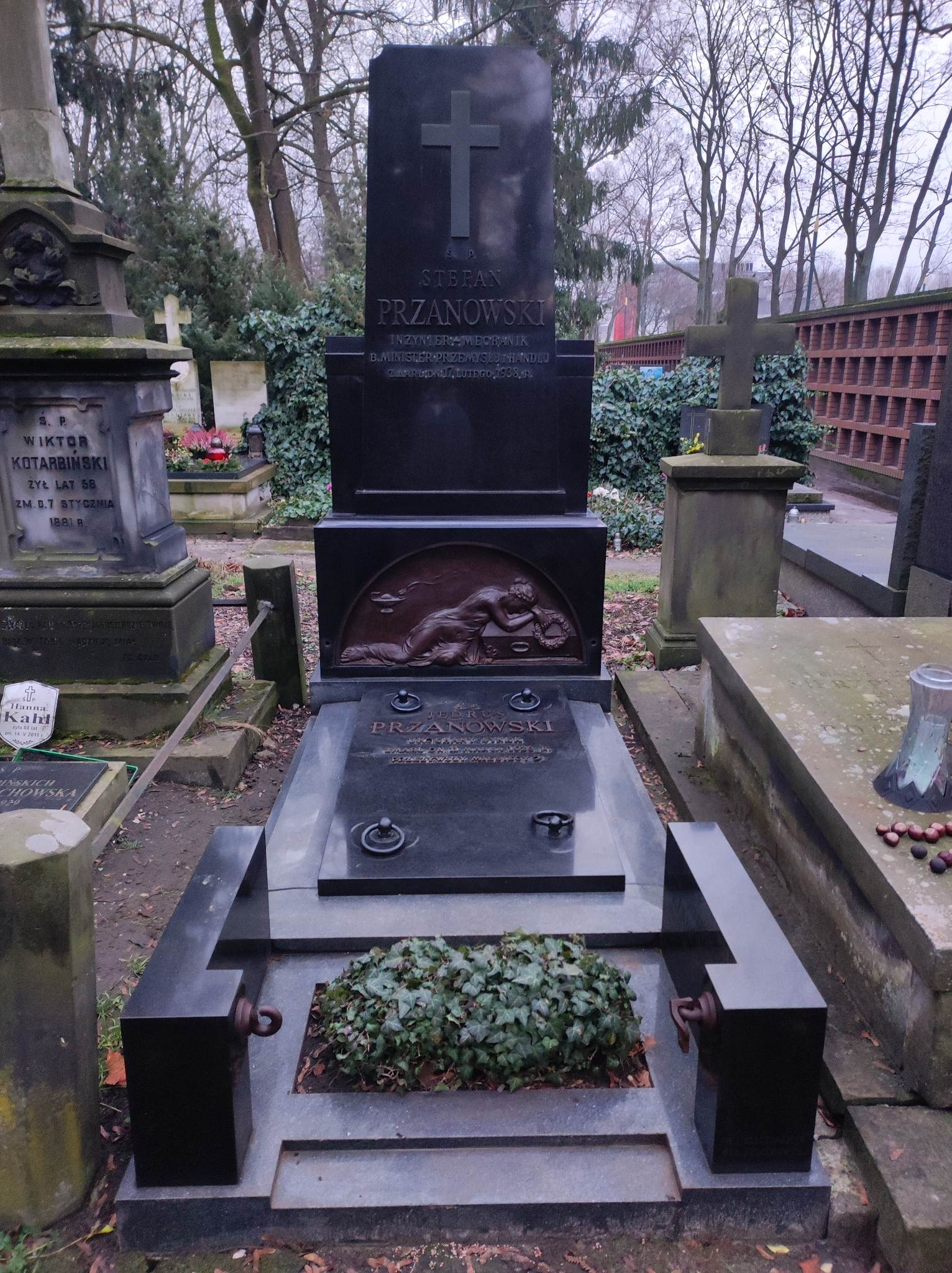
The grave of Minister Stefan Przanowski at Stare Powązki in Warsaw after renovation in 2022

In 2022 the grave of Stefan Przanowski was renovated. The entire project was implemented by the Stare Powązki Foundation in cooperation with the Chancellery of the Prime Minister.

== Orders and decorations ==
- Commander's Cross with Star of the Order of Polonia Restituta (May 2, 1924)
- Commander's Cross of the Order of Polonia Restituta (May 2, 1924)
- Golden Cross of Merit (1937)
- Commander's Cross with Star of the Order of the Crown of Romania (Romania, 1922)

== Bibliography ==
- Przanowski Stefan (1874–1938), [w:] Polski Słownik Biograficzny. Wrocław: Ossolineum, 1985 tom XXVIII/4, s. 640–642 (autor biogramu: Ryszard Szwoch).
- Ministrowie Polski Niepodległej 1918–1945, pod red. Marka Baumgarta, Henryka Walczaka i Adama Wątora. Szczecin: Wyd. Naukowe Uniwersytetu Szczecińskiego, 2001, s. 327–329, ISBN 83-7241-146-8.
- Encyklopedia historii gospodarczej Polski do 1945 roku.
- Encyklopedia Warszawy (suplement).
- Słownik biograficzny techników polskich, tom 10 (autor biogramu: Józef Piłatowicz).
