= Björn Engwall =

Swedish Navy officer (1917–2005)

- Born: 24 September 1917; Gävle, Sweden
- Died: 24 June 2005 (aged 87); Gothenburg, Sweden
- Relatives: Knut Emil Engwall (father)
- Military career
- Allegiance: Sweden
- Branch: Swedish Navy
- Service years: 1942–1977
- Rank: Senior colonel
- Commands: Vaxholm Coastal Artillery Regiment; Karlskrona Defence District; Blekinge Coastal Artillery Defence

Senior Colonel Björn Engwall (24 September 1917 – 24 June 2005) was a Swedish Coastal Artillery officer. He served as commanding officer of Vaxholm Coastal Artillery Regiment in Vaxholm from 1967 to 1969 and as Defence District Commander of Karlskrona Defence District and commanding officer of Blekinge Coastal Artillery Defence in Karlskrona from 1969 to 1977.

== Early life ==
Engwall was born on 24 September 1917 in Gävle Holy Trinity Parish in Gävle, Sweden, the son of Knut Emil Engwall, a civil engineer, and his wife Emy (née Cedergren). Engwall passed studentexamen at Norra Real in Stockholm in 1937 and then did military service in Kronoberg Regiment in Växjö.

== Career ==
Engwall chose to transfer to the Swedish Coastal Artillery, where he was accepted as a cadet in 1939 an enrolled in Karlskrona. At the Royal Swedish Naval Academy he attended the same class as future Senior Colonel Kjell Werner and the industrialist Gunnar O. Westerberg. Engwall graduated in 1942 and was commissioned in to the Swedish Coastal Artillery as a second lieutenant. Engwall was assigned to the motorized artillery units that were being established at the time. He also had a six-month assignment at the Swedish Army Vehicle School (Arméns motorskola, MotorS). After his service with 15 cm artillery batteries in Karlskrona Coastal Artillery Regiment, he served with 21 cm Kanone 39 artillery batteries in Älvsborg Coastal Artillery Regiment in Gothenburg. He was promoted to lieutenant in 1944 and to captain in 1949. Engwall attended the Royal Swedish Naval Staff College's staff and artillery courses from 1950 to 1951 and served as a teacher of artillery at the Royal Swedish Naval Academy from 1958 to 1959.

Engwall served as chief of staff of the Norrland Coastal Artillery Defence in Härnösand from 1959 to 1962 and was promoted to major in 1960. In 1962, Engwall was promoted to lieutenant colonel and then served as chief of staff of the Coastal Artillery Inspectorate (Kustartilleriinspektionen) until 1963. From 1963 to 1967, he was the head of the Swedish Coast Artillery School (Kustartilleriets skjutskola) and was promoted to colonel in 1964. From 1967 to 1969, Engwall served as the commanding officer of the Vaxholm Coastal Artillery Regiment. In 1969, he was promoted to senior colonel and served from 1969 to 1977 as Defence District Commander of Karlskrona Defence District and commander of Blekinge Coastal Artillery Defence. Engwall retired in 1977.

== Personal life ==
In 1942, Engwall married Vera Hansson (1918–1975), the daughter of accountant John Hansson and Anna-Lisa (née Enberg). They had one daughter, Ylva (born 1949). In 1976 he married Maj Folkeson (born 1920), the daughter of merchant Folke Pettersson and Olga (née Wijnbladh).

Engwall lived in a house in Holmsjö, north of Karlskrona in Blekinge until his first wife's death. He then lived in Gothenburg with his second wife, until his death in 2005.

== Death ==
Engwall died on 24 June 2005 in Göteborgs domkyrkoförsamling in Gothenburg, Sweden.

== Dates of rank ==
- 1942 – Second lieutenant
- 1944 – Lieutenant
- 1949 – Captain
- 1960 – Major
- 1962 – Lieutenant colonel
- 1964 – Colonel
- 1969 – Senior colonel

== Awards and decorations ==
- (Sweden) Commander 1st Class of the Order of the Sword (1971)
- (Sweden) Commander of the Order of the Sword (6 June 1968)
- (Sweden) Knight of the Order of the Sword (1960)

== Honours ==
- Member of the Royal Swedish Society of Naval Sciences (1971)
