= Knut Emil Engwall =

Swedish industrialist and politician

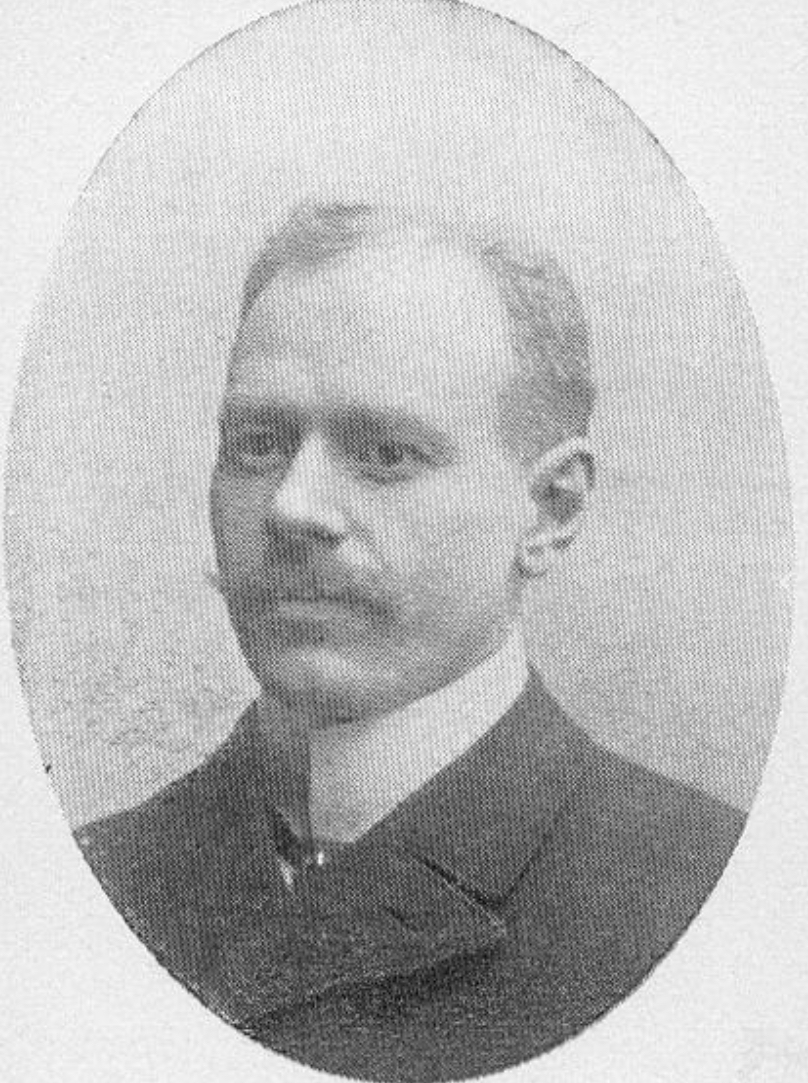

3rd Patriarch of the Engwall family 1st Patriarch of the 7th lineage
- Preceded by: Ernst Victor Engwall
- Succeeded by: Sven Victor Engwall

3rd chairman of Vict. Th. Engwall & Co 3st chairman of the Engwall board
- Preceded by: Ernst Victor Engwall
- Succeeded by: Sven Victor Engwall

Personal details
- Born: 1863
- Died: 25 March 1923 (aged 59–60)
- Resting place: The Engwall family grave in Gävle
- Spouse: Calla Gyllenhammar
- Children: 9, including Björn Engwall
- Parent: Victor Theodor Engwall
- Profession: Merchant; Industrialist; Philanthropist
- Portfolio: Vict. Th. Engwall & Co

Knut Emil Engwall (English pronunciation: [nˈʌt ˈɛmɪl ɛŋɡwˈɔːl]; Hangul: 크누트 에밀 잉월; born 3 October 1863, died 27 March 1923) was a Swedish industrialist, activist, politician and heir of the Engwall family.

== Biography ==
Knut Emil Engwall was the sixth son of Victor Theodor Engwall. Emil Engwall obtained a civil engineering degree in 1887. He joined Vict. Th. Engwall & Co in 1893. He was appointed as a partner in 1898, deputy CEO in 1905, and ultimately CEO in 1915, following the passing of his brother.

Before joining the family business, Knut Emil Engwall, lived in the United States and Mexico. In the United States, he initiated an acquaintanceship with Thomas Edison. In 1881, Knut Emil Engwall volunteered in preparation for the New York City lightening event. On September 4, 1882, Emil Engwall witnessed what he later recalled to be "The first lightning of a metropolitan". In the United States he initially lived with his uncle John Engwall, who had been received in the highest ranks of Free Masonry, and was a Noble of the Mystic Shrine. John Engwall was the President of the National Publishing Company, the oldest subscription publication in the United States. In New York City, Knut Emil Engwall became acquainted with Carl Leopold Berggren, his future grandfather-in-law and Viktor Gyllenhammar, Emil's later father-in-law.

He enrolled at KTH Royal Institute of Technology in 1883. From 1883 to 1887, Knut Emil Engwall was chairman of the student body at KTH Royal Institute of Technology. In 1888, Knut Emil Engwall returned to the United States and was appointed as a board member of Thomson-Houston Electric Company. He was nominated by his uncle-in-laws, Ernst Berggren and Carl Berggren, who had introduced Knut Emil Engwall to Edison during his first visit. Emil's uncle-in-laws was both board members of Edison Electric Co. of New York City.

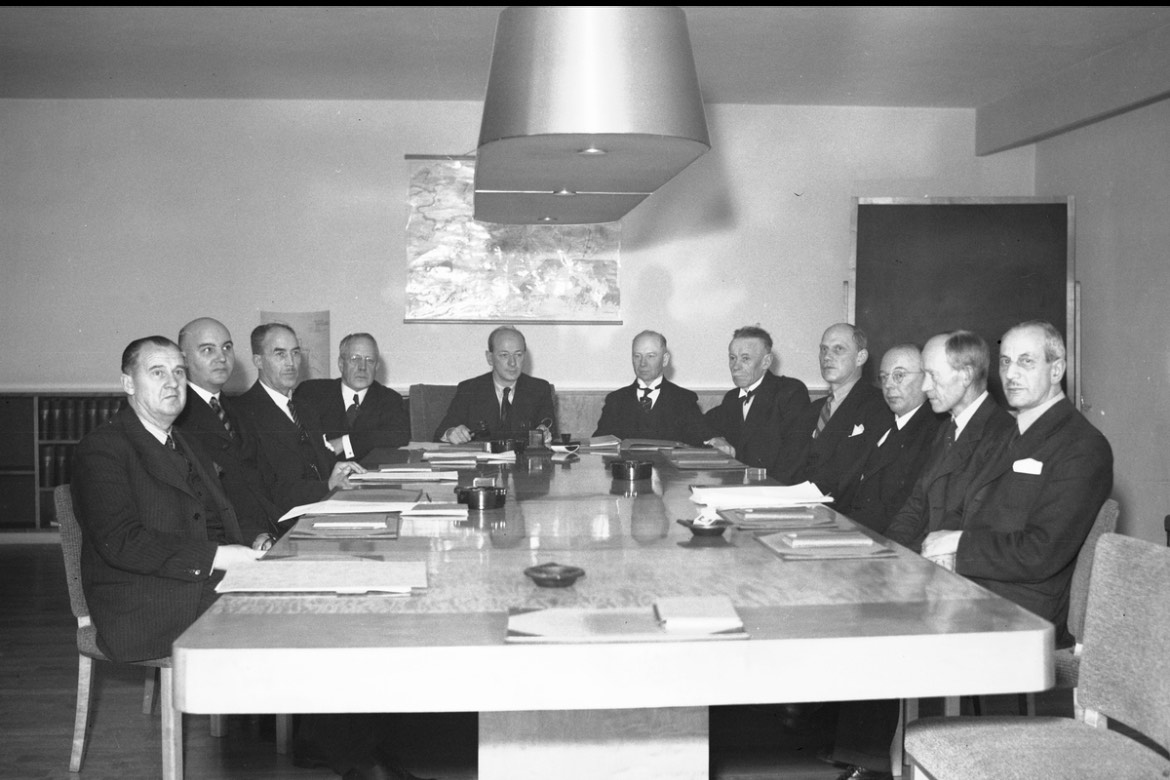
Belysningsstyrelsen, January 1942

In Scandinavia, he became an advocate for the "lightening up of all cities". Knut Emil Engwall, upon his return to Gävle, acquired multiple electricity plants. Knut Emil Engwall served as the chairman of the lightning board and played a crucial role in the development of the regional electricity plant. In 1892, He was appointed Chairman of Brunkebergsverket, Sweden's first electricity plant, and later assumed the role of director at the regional power plant. In 1896, he was also appointed vice-chairman of Gefle Elektriska Belysningsaktiebolag.

In 1900, Knut Emil Engwall, oversaw the lightning of Seoul's Jongno Street, the first street lightning in the Korean Empire. He was an unspecified executive at Hanseong Jeongi Hoesa (Seoul Electric Company), and became acquainted with Gojong of Korea. In 1900, the pro-American Lee Chae-Yeon, President of Hanseong Jeongi Hoesa, died. In 1901, Emil Engwall moved from Korea. He retained a close relationship with Horace Newton Allen, a U.S. Legation official, who later became United States Minister to Korea and Consul General. Newton Allen was a major advocate for the electrification of Korea. In 1905, Emil Engwall uttered support for Allan, who was recalled due to disagreements over the Taft-Katsura Agreement.

=== AB Gävle-Dala Järnväg ===
Knut Emil Engwall was active in AB Gävle-Dala Järnväg, a project initially funded by his family. In the United States he befriended, the son of railway-tycoon and politician Nils Ericson, Werner Ericson, who on his father behalf initiated a railway cooperation program between AB Gävle-Dala Järnväg, Bergslagernas Järnvägar, and Stockholm–Västerås–Bergslagens Järnvägar.

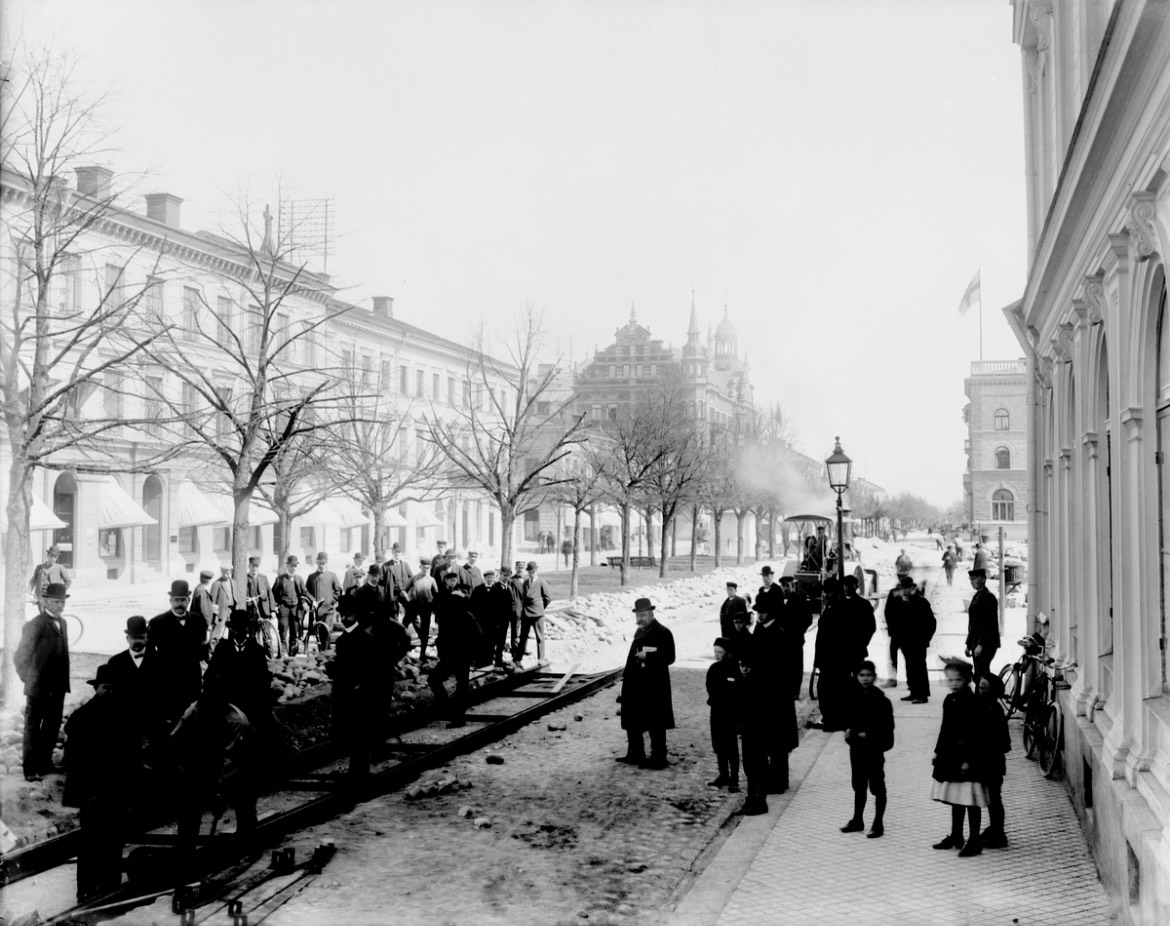
Gävle-Dala Järnväg extension, 1909

In 1889, the estimated cost of the cooperation program between Gävla-Dala railway, Bergslagernas Järnvägar, and Stockholm–Västerås–Bergslagens Järnvägar, was 100 000 000 in monetary value (approximately 4.87% of the Swedish GDP in 1889), equivalent to present date SEK 370 billion.

The program was funded by private and public entities. Knut Emil Engwall's older brother, Ernst Victor Engwall, as a member of Gävle City Council and established within the political sphere secured funding from the government body of Gävle Municipality.

In 1899, Emil Engwall, assisted his brother to be nominated as vice-chairman of Gefleborgs Enskilda Bank for the project to receive additional funding. The board at the time consisted of Emil Engwall's Uncle-in-law, Carl Waldemar Berggren; Carl Gustaf Ericson, brother of Werner Ericson; and Per Edward Rettig, the son of Carl Anton Rettig, a railway tycoon and Emil Engwall's mentor. Subsequently, Gefleborgs Enskilda Bank granted favourable loans to the project.

On 9 June 1886, in New York City, Knut Emil Engwall married Calla Gyllenhammar. She was the daughter of Captain Victor Constantine Gyllenhammar and Julia Terese Berggren, daughter of Carl Leopold Berggren. She was the sister of "insurance king", Pher Gyllenhammar Sr., and aunt of Pehr Gyllenhammar Jr., Sweden's most influential businessman in the 1970s. In 1909, Calla Gyllenhammar died. The couple had five children.

=== Telecommunication ===
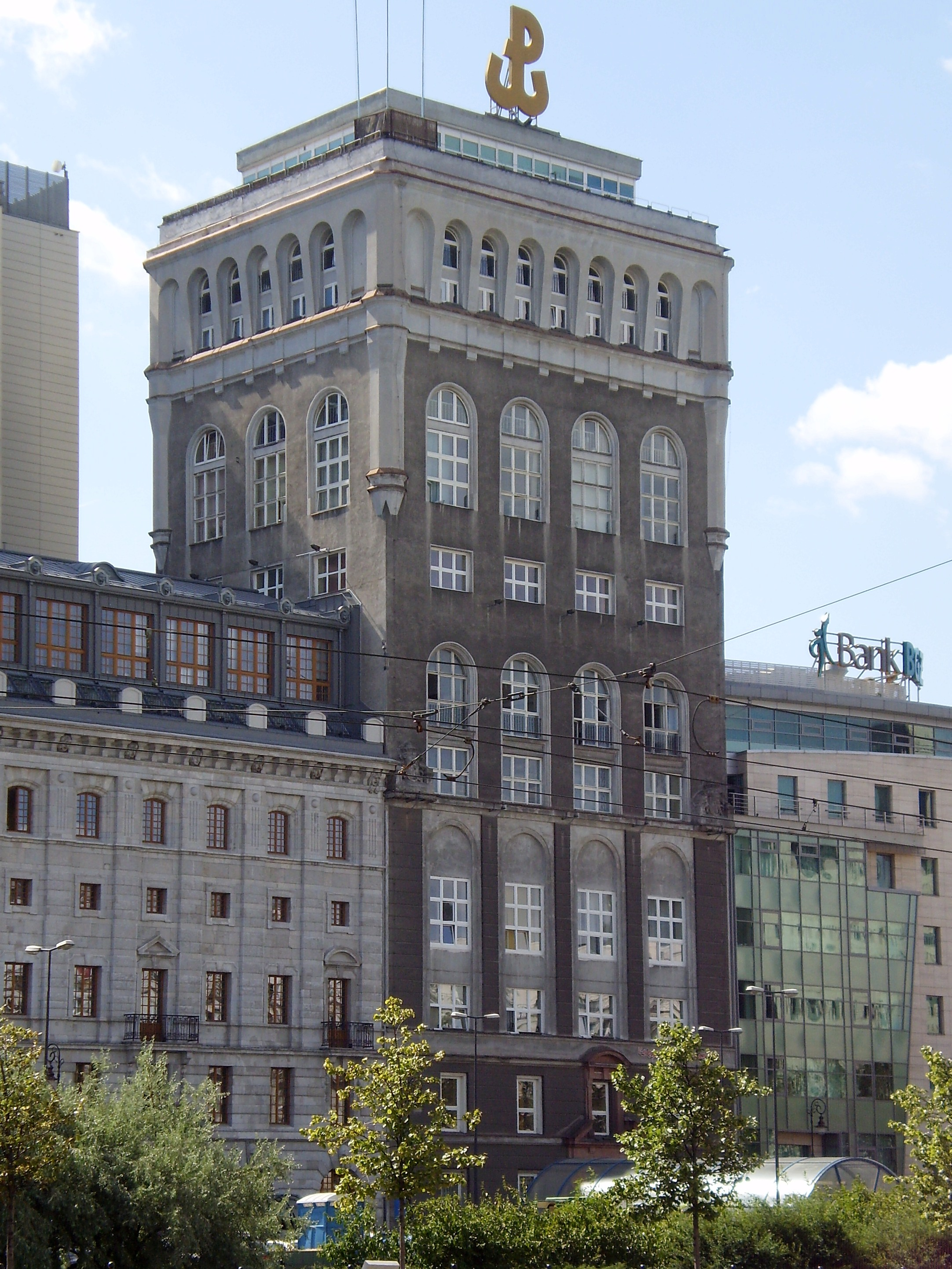
The Cedergren Tower, Warsaw

In Mexico, Knut Emil Engwall worked in telecommunications. He established an acquaintanceship with Henrik Tore Cedergren, "the telephone king of Stockholm". Henrik Tore Cedergren's company, Stockholms Allmänna Telefonaktiebolag (SAT), had a telecommunications monopoly in Stockholm. In 1883, Stockholms Allmänna Telefonaktiebolag (SAT) initiated a partnership with L M Ericsson & Co. In 1891, Henrik Tore Cedergren acquired majority ownership L M Ericsson & Co. Emil Engwall, following the acquisition, was nominated as vice-chairman at Cedergren. In 1898, he was appointed as chairman of Cedergren. The company had at the time a monopoly over telecommunications in Warsaw.

In 1904, Knut Emil Engwall initiated the construction of Imperial Russia's first skyscraper, the Cedergren Tower. After Calla Gyllenhammar's death, in 1909, Emil Engwall married Emy Cedergren the granddaughter of Henrik Tore Cedergren. In Warsaw, the Engwalls befriended members of the House of Bogdan-Mușat and of the House of Hohenzollern-Sigmaringen. In 1924, Ivan von Bogdan, Prince of Bogdan-Mușat married into the Engwall family.

In the sphere of telecommunications, Knut Emil Engwall befriended Ivar Kreuger, "the match king". In the 1920s, Ivar Kreuger acquired a position as principal shareholder of L M Ericsson & Co. Kreuger also acquired the Engwalls previously operated match factories for a premium. Knut Emil Engwall regarded Ivar Kreuger and Paul Toll, the owners of Kreuger & Toll, as "Two men of noble virtues, shaping history through self-will and capabilities". In 1913, Paul Toll married Gunhild Maria Engwall, Knut Emil Engwall's niece.

In 1923, Knut Emil Engwall died at the age of 60. He served as chairman of Vict. Th. Engwall & Co, Brunkebergsverket, The Lightning Board, AB Gävle-Dala Järnväg, and Cedergren. He served as vice-chairman of Gefle Elektriska Belysningsaktiebolag, Bergslagernas Järnvägar, and Stockholm–Västerås–Bergslagens Järnvägar. He sat on the board of Hanseong Jeongi Hoesa (Seoul Electric Company), Kreuger & Toll Construction, Stockholms Allmänna Telefonaktiebolag (SAT), L M Ericsson & Co, and General Electric Company (GE). After Emil Engwall's death his wife, Emy Cedergren, and daughter, Inga Karin Emilia Engwall, moved into Ivar Kreuger's private residence on Villagatan 13, Östermalm.

Knut Emil Engwall had a total of nine children: Kerstin Viktoria Engwall, Pehr Viktor Engwall, Yngve Viktor Engwall, Rolf Viktor Engwall, Inga Karin Emilia Engwall, Björn Engwall, Bertil Engwall, and Marianne Engwall. The descendants later became an integral part of the Engwall legacy.
