= Beri Gerwise =

Swedish actress (born 1997)

- Born: 1997 (age 29)
- Occupation: Actress
- Partner: Nicole Sandgren
- Children: 2

Beri Gerwise (born 1997) is a Swedish actress. She began her career as a hip-hop artist, winning the Nästa Nivå talent competition in 2014. She released an album in 2017 and then shifted to acting. She has since been featured in a number of stage performances. Gerwise played the lead roles of Malin in Maja Salomonsson's adaptation of Karin Boye's 1934 autobiographical novel Crisis and of Loella in Pappa Pellerin's Daughter in 2022 and 2025, respectively. She has also had supporting roles in Swedish-language Netflix originals: the series Young Royals (2021–2024) and miniseries Deliver Me (2024).

== Life and career ==
She was born in 1997 to an Iranian father and a Kurdish mother. She grew up in Upplands Väsby, outside Stockholm. Her mother died of cancer when she was ten years old. She came out as a lesbian when she was a teenager. In 2014, she participated in the Nästa Nivå music competition, where she was coached by Syster Sol. Gerwise won the competition, and the following December she released 100, her first EP. She performed with Louise Hoffsten on TV4 and her debut album Rum (English: Room) was released in June 2017. The following year, she contributed a verse to a remix of Cleo's song "Tagga ner".

In 2020, she appeared in Athena Farrokhzad's Krigerska, where she told the story of her mother's death. She played the lead role of Malin Frost in Maja Salomonsson's adaptation of Karin Boye's 1934 novel Crisis. The play premiered at the Kulturhuset Stadsteatern in Vällingby on 26 February 2022. Gerwise's performance as a young woman struggling with her religious faith and feelings for a female classmate received praise from Sara Granath in Svenska Dagbladet. The following year, she played Mejram in Så nätterna, a polyamorous interpretation of William Shakespeare's sonnets directed by Maria Salah at Kulturhuset Stadsteatern Skärholmen. Reviewing the production for Expressen, Ulrika Kärnborg wrote that she portrayed her character "with passionate intensity" (med hetsig inlevelse). In 2025, Gerwise had the main part of Loella in a production of Pappa Pellerin's Daughter at the Orion Theatre. She appeared in a children's theatre production of Fullmåne at Unga Klara in 2026. In addition to music and stage acting, she has also been featured in two Swedish-language Netflix original programs. She played Rosh in Young Royals (2021–2024) and police officer Lana in the miniseries Deliver Me (2024). She and her girlfriend Nicole Sandgren have two children.

== Acting credits ==
=== Television ===
Year	Title	Role	Notes	Ref.
2021–2024	Young Royals	Rosh		
2024	Deliver Me	Lana		

=== Theatre ===
Year	Title	Role	Venue	Notes	Ref.
2020	Krigerska		Backa Theatre		
2022	Crisis	Malin Frost	Kulturhuset Stadsteatern Vällingby		
2022	Vem som hon		Kulturhuset Stadsteatern Skärholmen		
2023	Klicka		Kulturhuset Stadsteatern Husby		
2024	Så nätterna	Mejram	Kulturhuset Stadsteatern Skärholmen		
2025	Pappa Pellerin's Daughter	Loella	Orion Theatre		
2026	Fullmåne		Unga Klara		
