= Gyllenhammar =

Gyllenhammar is a surname. Notable people with the surname include:

- Cecilia Gyllenhammar (born 1961), Swedish author
- Charlotte Gyllenhammar (born 1963), Swedish artist
- Pehr Gyllenhammar (1901–1988), Swedish insurance company executive
- Pehr G. Gyllenhammar (1935–2024), Swedish businessman
- Ralf Gyllenhammar (born 1966) Swedish musician
