= Anna Ekström =

Swedish politician (born 1959)

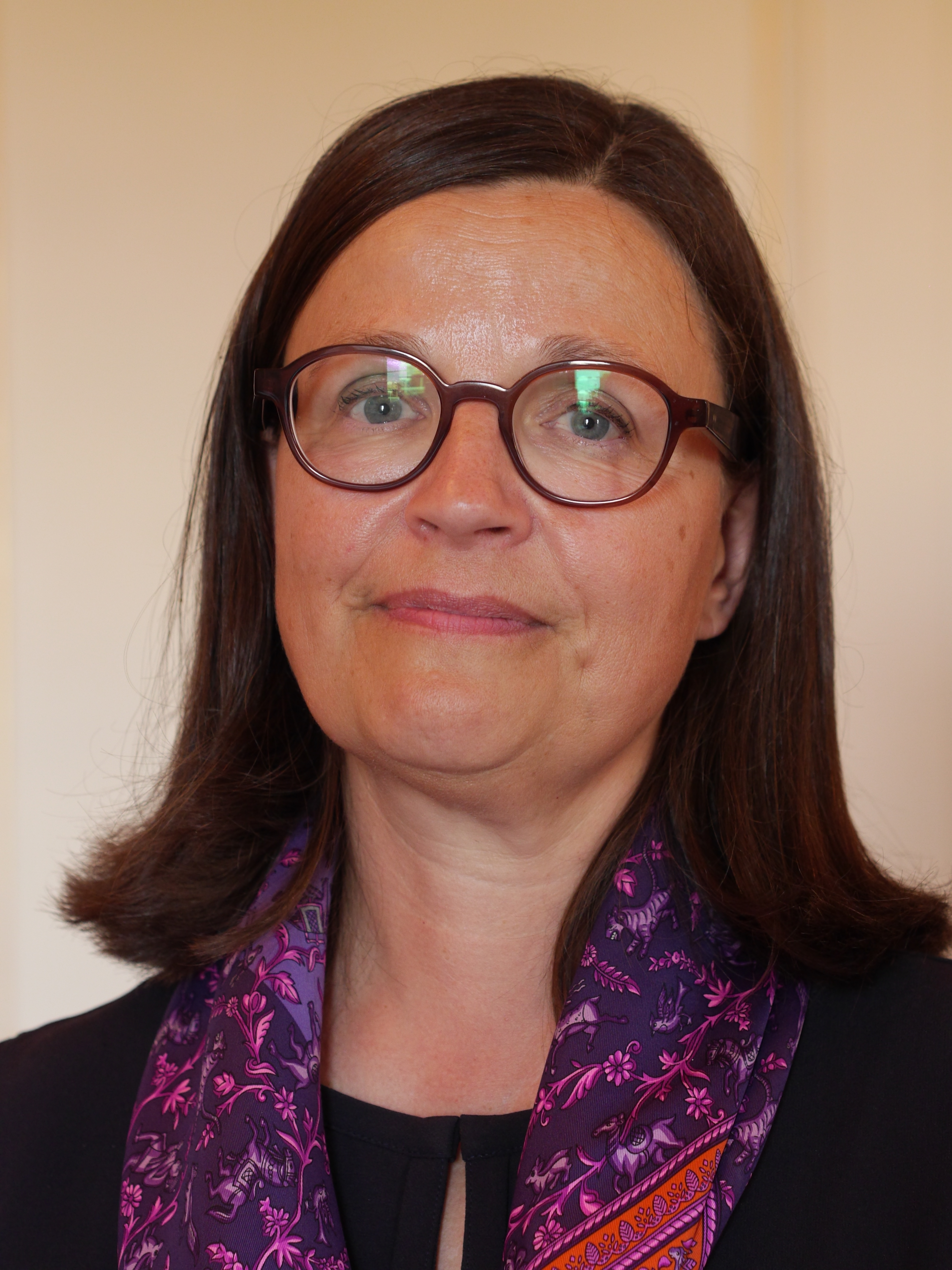

Minister for Education
- In office 21 January 2019 – 18 October 2022
- Monarch: Carl XVI Gustaf
- Prime Minister: Stefan Löfven; Magdalena Andersson
- Preceded by: Gustav Fridolin
- Succeeded by: Mats Persson

Minister for Upper Secondary School, Adult Education and Training
- In office 13 September 2016 – 21 January 2019
- Monarch: Carl XVI Gustaf
- Prime Minister: Stefan Löfven
- Preceded by: Aida Hadzialic
- Succeeded by: Office abolished

Personal details
- Born: 23 June 1959 (age 67) Mora, Sweden
- Party: Social Democratic
- Spouse: Lars Ekström
- Children: 2
- Education: Stockholm University
- Occupation: Jurist, politician

Anna Elsa Gunilla Ekström (née Jonsson; born 23 June 1959) is a Swedish Social Democrat politician who served as Minister for Education from January 2019 to October 2022. She previously served as the Minister for Upper Secondary School, Adult Education and Training from 2016 to 2019 and as director-general of the National Agency for Education from 2011 to 2016.

In 2015, she, along with Göran Hägglund, participated in the SVT show På spåret; they placed second overall.

She is the daughter of former Prosecutor-General of Sweden (1989–1994) Torsten Jonsson and Birgitta Jonsson (née Gyllenhammar), a cousin of Swedish businessman Pehr G. Gyllenhammar. Her brother is former Liberal Party state secretary Håkan Jonsson.
