= David McDuff =

Scottish translator, editor and literary critic

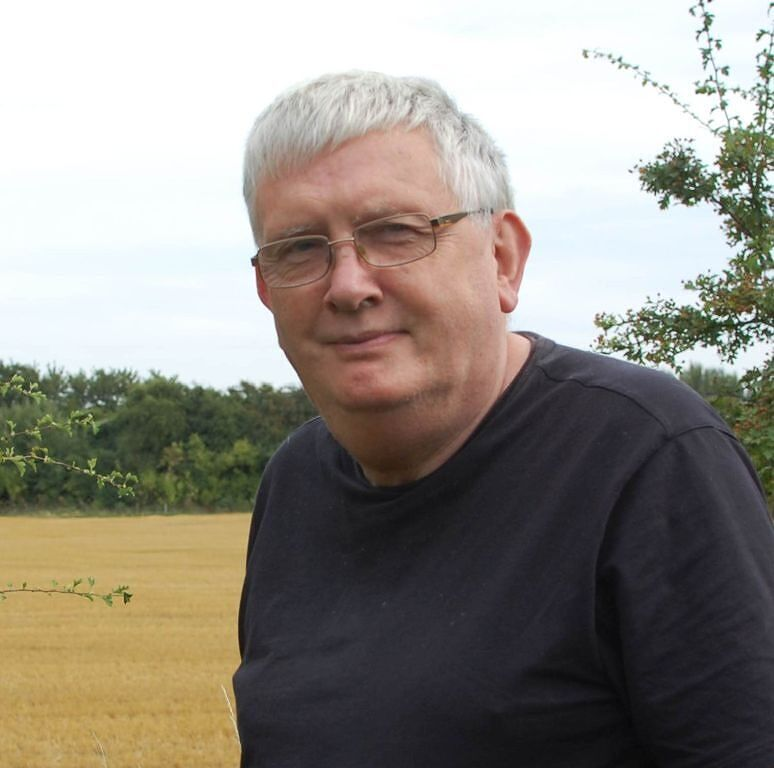
- Born: 1945 (age 80–81); Sale, Cheshire, England, U.K.
- Education: University of Edinburgh
- Occupations: translator, editor and literary critic

David McDuff (born 1945, Sale, Cheshire, England) is a Scottish translator, editor and literary critic.

== Life ==
McDuff attended the University of Edinburgh, where he studied Russian and German, gaining a PhD in 1971. He married mathematician Dusa McDuff, but they separated around 1975.

After living for some time in the Soviet Union, Denmark, Iceland, and the United States, he eventually returned to the United Kingdom, where he worked for several years as a co-editor and reviewer on the literary magazine Stand. He then moved to London, where he began his career as a literary translator.

McDuff's translations include both foreign poetry and prose, including poems by Joseph Brodsky and Tomas Venclova, and novels including Fyodor Dostoevsky's Crime and Punishment, The Brothers Karamazov, and The Idiot (all three in Penguin Classics). His Complete Poems of Edith Södergran (1984, 1992) and Complete Poems of Karin Boye (1994) were published by Bloodaxe Books. McDuff's translation of the Finnish-language writer Tuomas Kyrö's 2011 novel The Beggar and the Hare was published in 2014.

Among literary awards, he has received the 1994 TLS/George Bernard Shaw Translation Prize for his translation of Gösta Ågren's poems, A Valley in the Midst of Violence, published by Bloodaxe, and the 2006 Stora Pris of the Society of Swedish Authors in Finland.

From 2007 to 2010, David McDuff worked as an editor and translator with Prague Watchdog, the Prague-based non-governmental organization (NGO) which monitored and discussed human-rights abuses in Chechnya and the North Caucasus.

McDuff was honoured with the Finnish State Award for Foreign Translators in 2013.

In November 2019, his new translation of Karin Boye's dystopian novel Kallocain was published by Penguin Classics.

McDuff was honoured with the Swedish Academy's Interpretation Prize (Tolkningspris) 2021.

His translation of Anteckningar by Tua Forsström (I Walked On into the Forest, Bloodaxe, 2021) was The Poetry Book Society's Translation Choice for Winter 2021.

== Works ==
- Osip Mandelʹshtam Selected poems, Writers and Readers, 1983, ISBN 9780863160530
- Edith Södergran Complete poems, Bloodaxe Books, 1984, ISBN 9780906427385
- Marina Tsvetaeva, Selected Poems, Bloodaxe Books, 1987, ISBN 9781852240257
- Ice around our lips: Finland-Swedish poetry, Bloodaxe Books, 1989, ISBN 9781852240110
- Tua Forsström, Snow leopard, Bloodaxe, 1990, ISBN 9781852241117
- Isaak Babel (1994). Collected Stories. Penguin. ISBN 978-0-14-018462-4.
- Andrei Bely Petersburg, Penguin. 1995. ISBN 014-01-8696-4
- Ivan Sergeevich Turgenev, Rudin: On the eve, Oxford University Press, 1999, ISBN 9780192833334
- Fyodor Dostoyevsky (30 January 2003). Crime and Punishment. Penguin Books Limited. ISBN 978-0-14-044913-6
- Fyodor Dostoyevsky (27 February 2003). The Brothers Karamazov. Penguin Books Limited. ISBN 978-0-14-191568-5.
- Fyodor Dostoyevsky (31 August 2004). The Idiot. Penguin Group US. ISBN 978-1-101-16055-8.
- Fyodor Dostoyevsky (2003) The House of the Dead. Penguin Books Limited. ISBN 978-0-14-044456-8
- Tua Forsström, I studied once at a wonderful faculty, Bloodaxe, 2006, ISBN 9781852246495
- Karin Boye, Kallocain, Penguin Classics, 2019, ISBN 9780241355589
- Tua Forsström, I walked on into the forest, Bloodaxe, 2021, ISBN 9781780375823

== See also ==
- List of critics
- List of translators
- List of University of Edinburgh people
