= Astrid Tobieson Menasanch =

Swedish-Spanish playwright and director

Snickar Anna Astrid Tobieson Menasanch (born 29 December 1989) is a Swedish and Spanish playwright, director, producer and journalist. She has family in both Sweden and Spain.

== Works ==
Tobieson Menasanch graduated as an actress from the theatre academy Estudio Corazza, Madrid, in 2015.

But before that Tobieson Menasanch already in 2012 had debuted as a director and playwright with her play "Men det skulle ni aldrig våga (But you would never dare) at the Orion Theatre i Stockholm. It was described as an "in equal parts funny, vicious and talented diagnosis of the modern patriarchy, at the same time it's somewhat raucous: young, angry, vulnerable and strong". After her second play, 100 barn (100 children), the cultural journalist Maria Edström said that Tobieson Menasanch is "a playwright to keep your eyes on". Her play I landet som aldrig brann brinner nu träden (In the land that never burned the trees are now on fire) was described by the theatre critic Lars Ring as an "outstanding, fiery, poetic monologue". In 2016 she staged the "sharp and thought-provoking" play, Maktdröm (Power dream), at the institution theatre Regionteater Väst. The highschool kids met "modern theatre at its very best". In 2016 Tobieson Menasanch moved on to the European arena with her play Nattpassage (Night passage). It was based on a true story from Macedonia. The play was staged at Stockholm City Theatre in Stockholm and at Teatro del Barrio in Madrid. At the Stockholm City Theatre she directed Frontens gryningsfärg by Mustafa Can in 2017. She also works with humor group Caos Family which she will direct at the National Swedish Touring Theatre in 2018.

== Articles and political texts ==
Tobieson Menasanch frequently writes articles in the Swedish press. Among others she collaborates in papers as Aftonbladet, Expressen, Svenska Dagbladet, Sveriges Radio (national radio), and Feministiskt Perspektiv.

In 2012 she wrote an article named "Break the silence about Spain". The article was wide spread through Europe and translated into a least 5 different languages. Shortly after this she became an essayist in the Swedish radio, Sveriges Radio. She opened this work with an essay about her families direct relation to the Spanish democracy. She was perceived as "a new vibrant voice which one could have listened to for hours", according to Sydsvenskan.

In 2015 Tobieson Menasanch got into a public dispute with the Spanish ambassador in Sweden, Javier Jiménez-Ugarte. The trigger to the fight was a published article in Svenska Dagbladet named "Spanish Citizen Security Bill Violates Human Rights", initiated by Tobieson Menasanch and signed by 40 politics and experts. After a meeting with the Spanish ambassador Tobieson Menasanch attests that the ambassador tried to bribe her and buy her silence, which the ambassador himself denies.

== Plays ==
- Men det skulle ni aldrig våga, Orion Theatre, Stockholm, 2012
- 100 barn, Stockholm City Theatre, Stockholm, 2013
- I landet som aldrig brann brinner nu träden, Dramalabbet, 2015
- Power dream, Regionteater Väst, 2016
- Nattpassage, Stockholm City Theatre, Stockholm and Teatro del Barrio, Madrid, 2016
