= Bengt Erland Fogelberg =

Swedish sculptor (1786–1854)

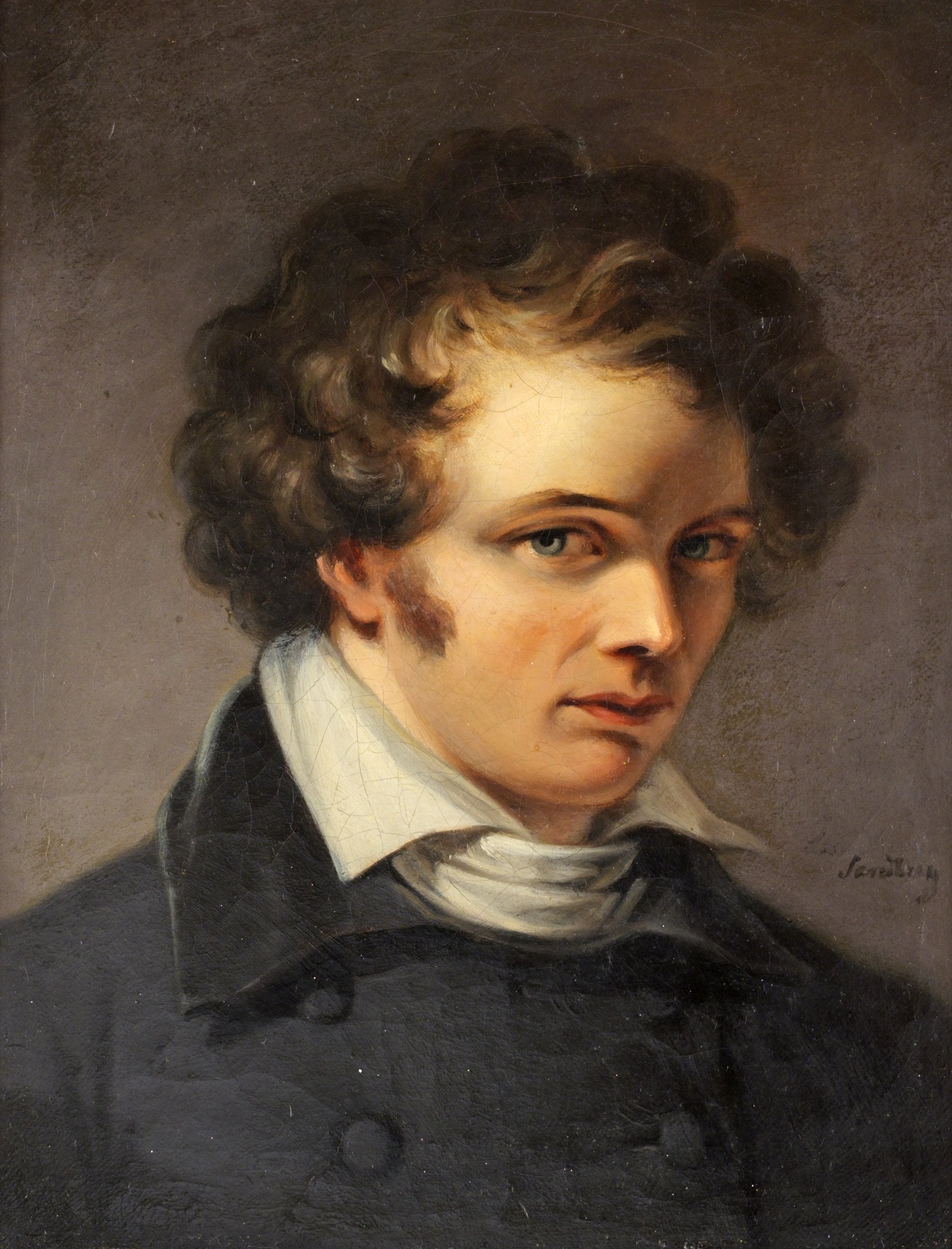
Bengt Fogelberg, portrait by Johan Gustaf Sandberg

Bengt Erland Fogelberg, also known as Benedict Fogelberg, (8 August 1786 – 22 December 1854) was a Swedish sculptor.

== Biography ==
Fogelberg was born in Gothenburg. His father, a copper-founder, encouraging an early exhibited taste for design, sent him in 1801 to Stockholm, where he studied at the school of art. There he came much under the influence of the sculptor Johan Tobias Sergel, who communicated to him his own enthusiasm for antique art and natural grace. Fogelberg worked hard at Stockholm for many years, although his instinct for severe beauty rebelled against the somewhat rococo quality of the art then prevalent in the city.

In 1818 the grant of a government pension enabled him to travel. He studied from one to two years in Paris, first under Pierre-Narcisse Guérin, and afterwards under the sculptor François Joseph Bosio, for the technical practice of sculpture. In 1820 Fogelberg realized a dream of his life in visiting Rome, where the greater part of his remaining years were spent in the assiduous practice of his art, and the careful study and analysis of the works of the past.

Visiting his native country by royal command in 1854, he was received with great enthusiasm, but nothing could compensate him for the absence of those remains of antiquity and surroundings. He died suddenly of apoplexy at Trieste on 22 December 1854. He is buried at Östra kyrkogården in Gothenburg.

The subjects of Fogelbergs earlier works are mostly taken from classic mythology, such as Apollo Citharede, Venus and Cupid (1839) and Psyche (1854). His Odin (1831), Thor (1842), and Balder (1842), were influenced by Greek art, although showing independent imagination. His portraits and historical figures, as those of Gustavus Adolphus (1849), of Charles XII (1851), of Charles XIII (1852), and of Birger Jarl, the founder of Stockholm (1853), are faithful and dignified works.

He sculpted the equestrian statue of King Charles XIV John (Karl XIV Johan) located at Slussplan on Gamla Stan in Stockholm.

== Gallery ==
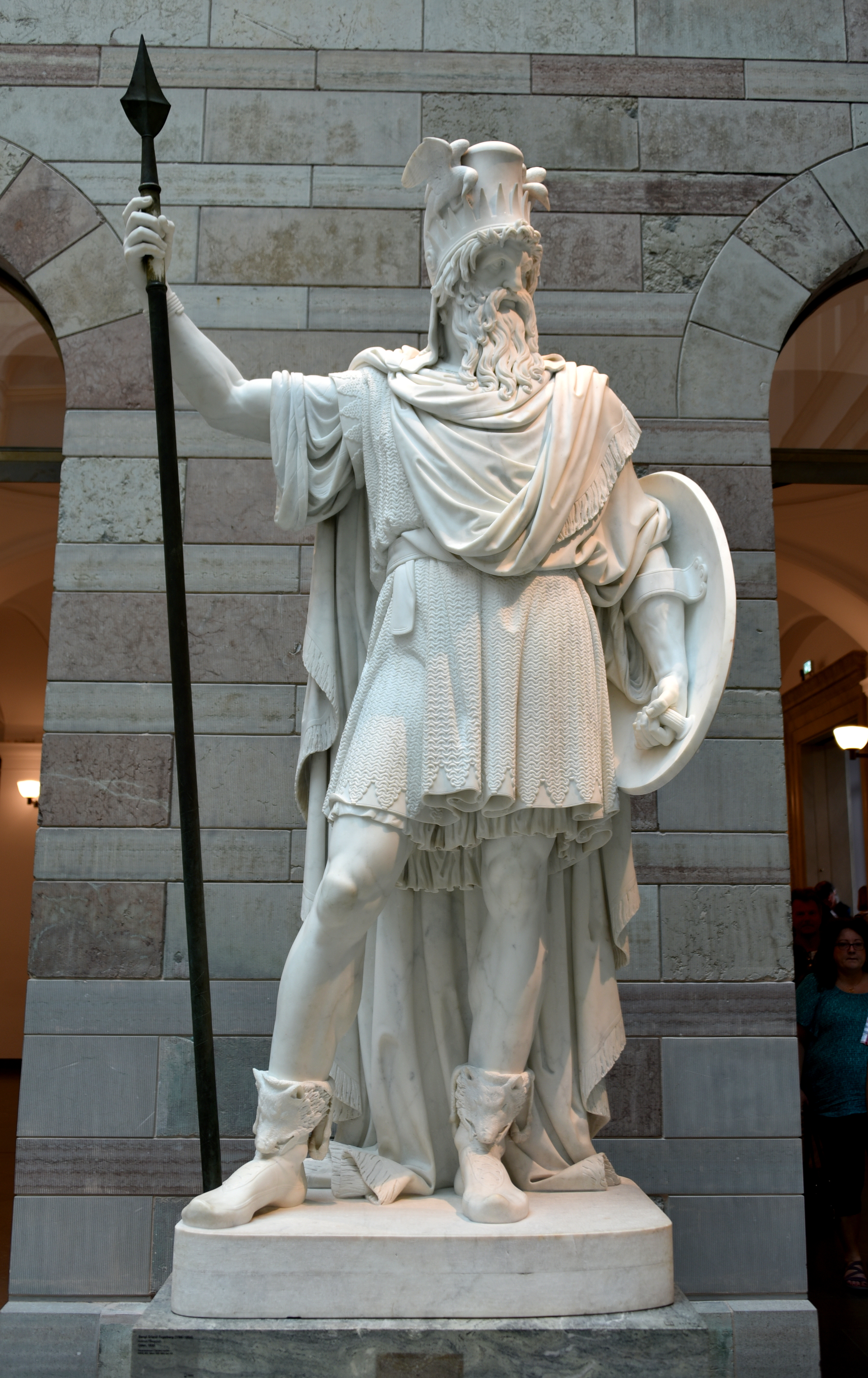
Oden, 1830, by Bengt Erland Fogelberg, carrara marble. Nationalmuseum, Stockholm, Sweden

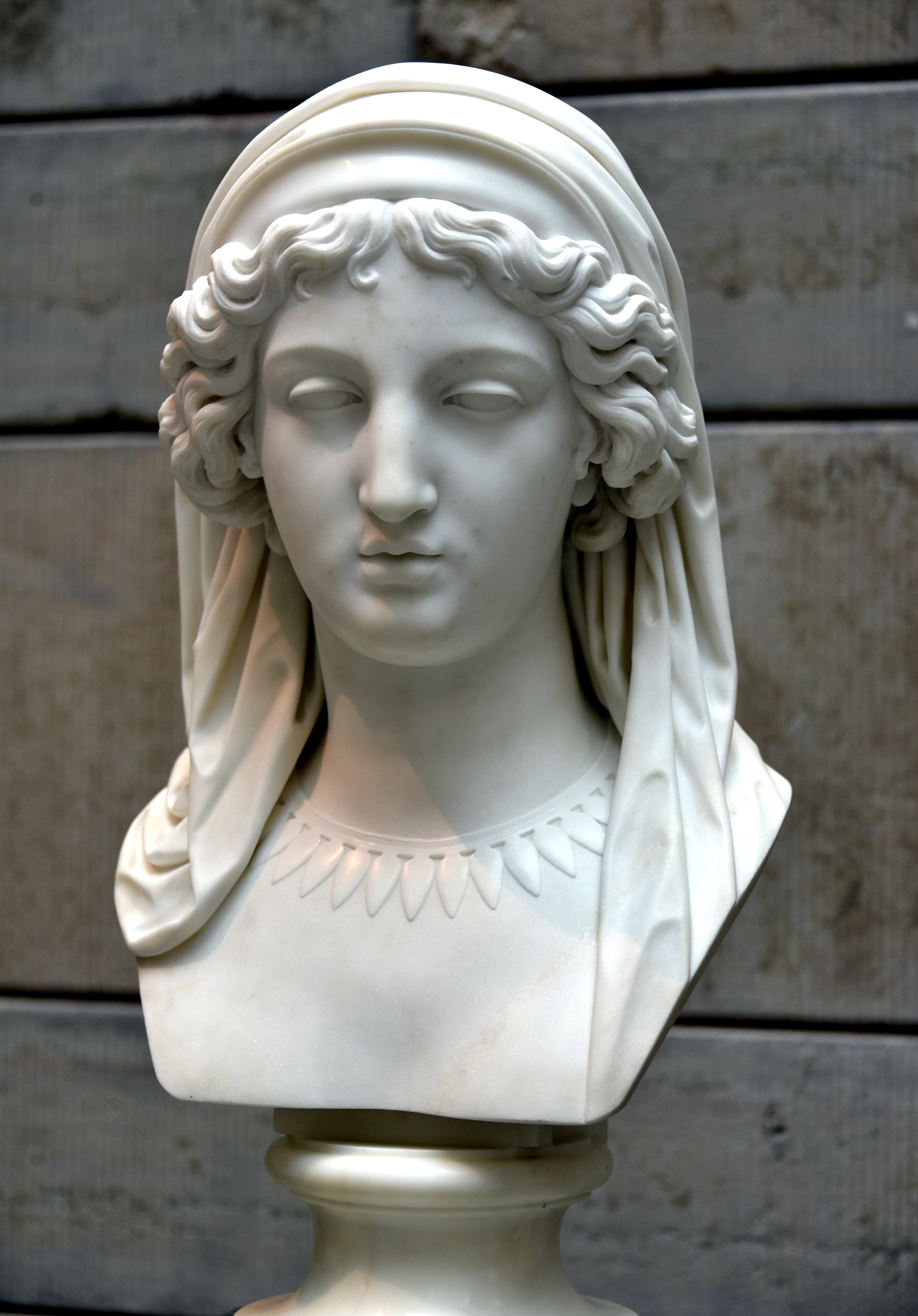
Helen, consort of Menelaos, by Bengt Erland Fogelberg, carrara marble. Nationalmuseum, Stockholm, Sweden

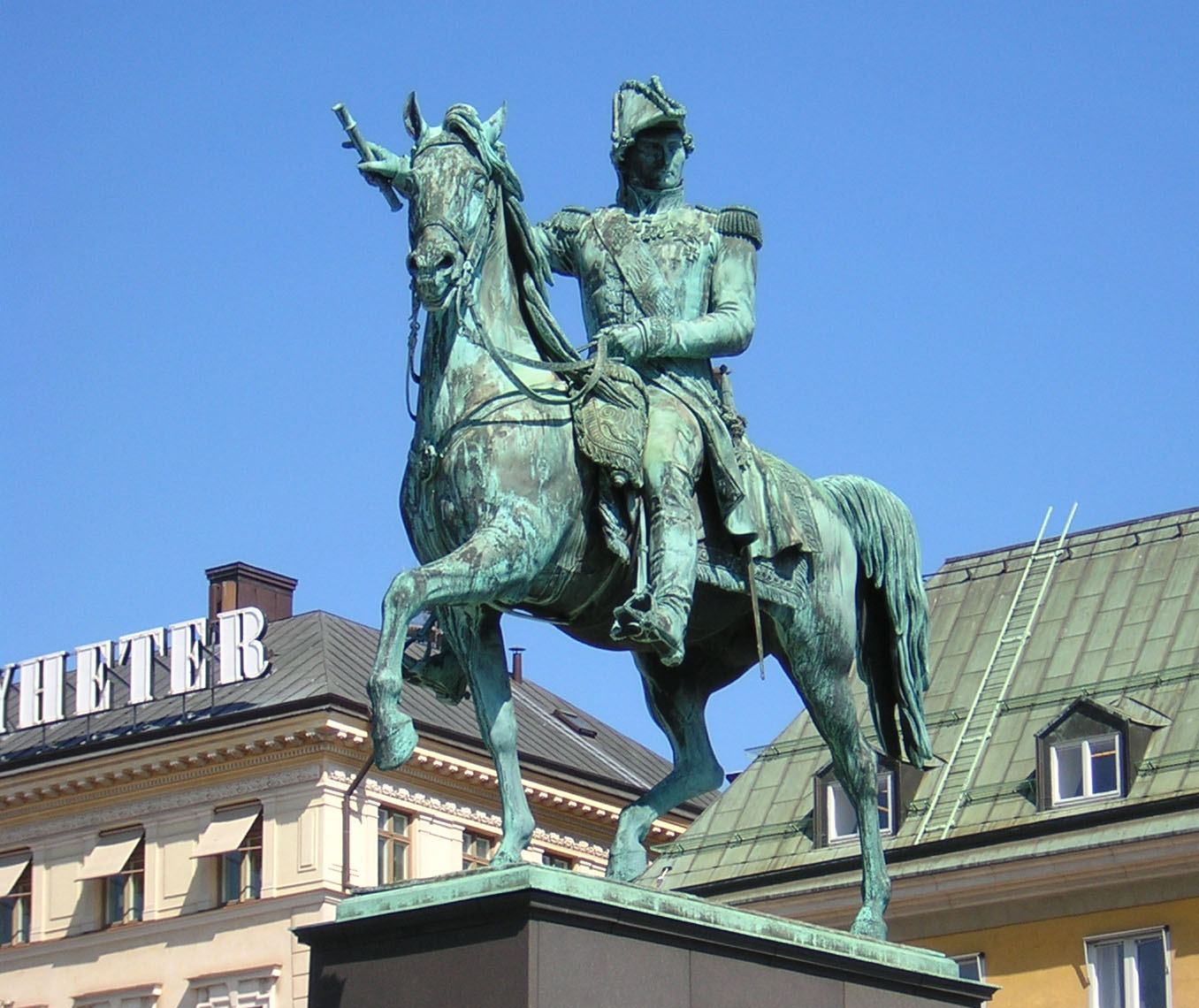
Equestrian statue of Karl XIV Johan, in Stockholm

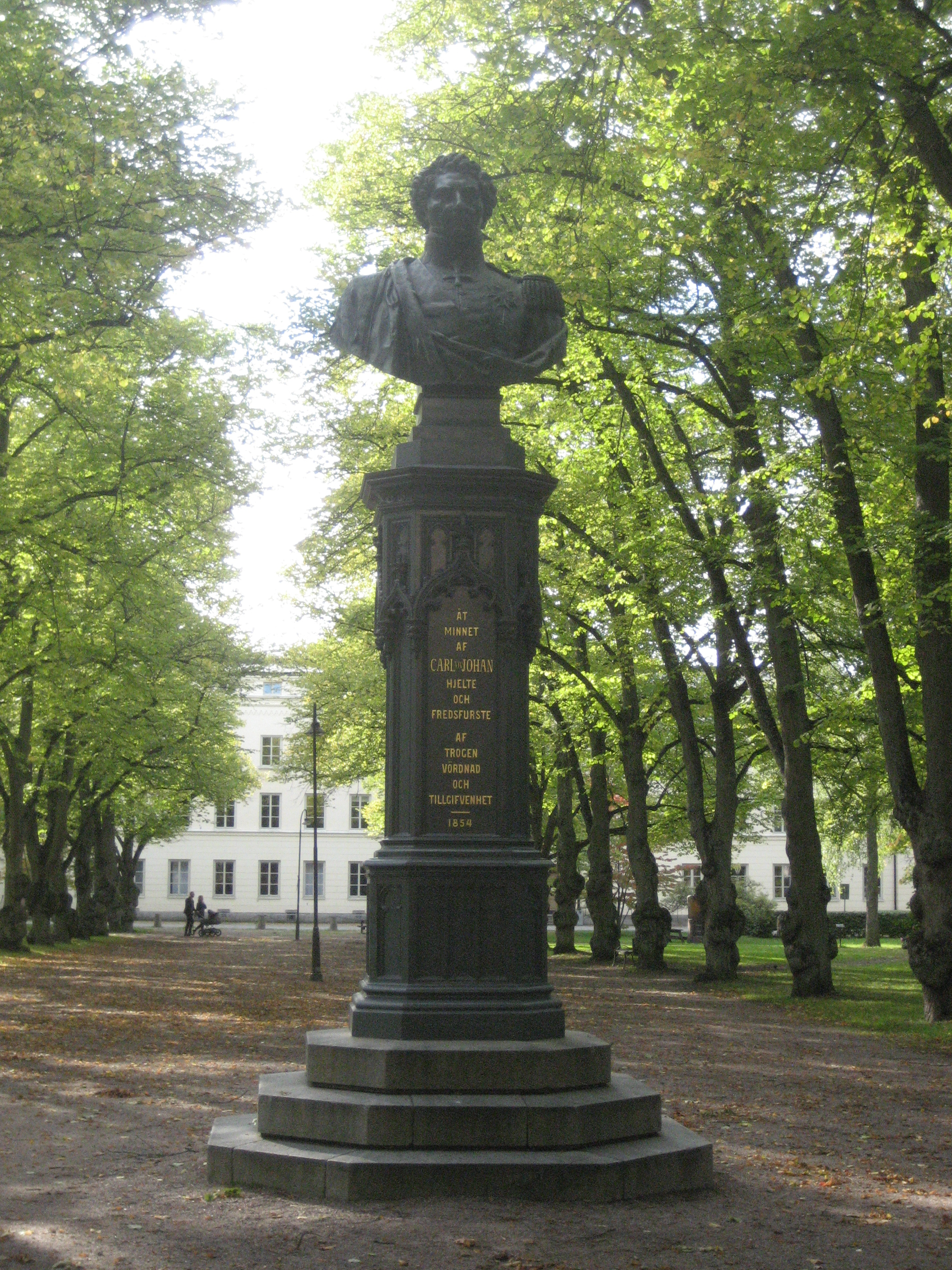
Bust of Karl XIV Johan, in Uppsala

== Other sources ==
- Biography @ the Svenskt Biografiskt Lexikon
