= Beatrice Dickson =

Swedish philanthropist

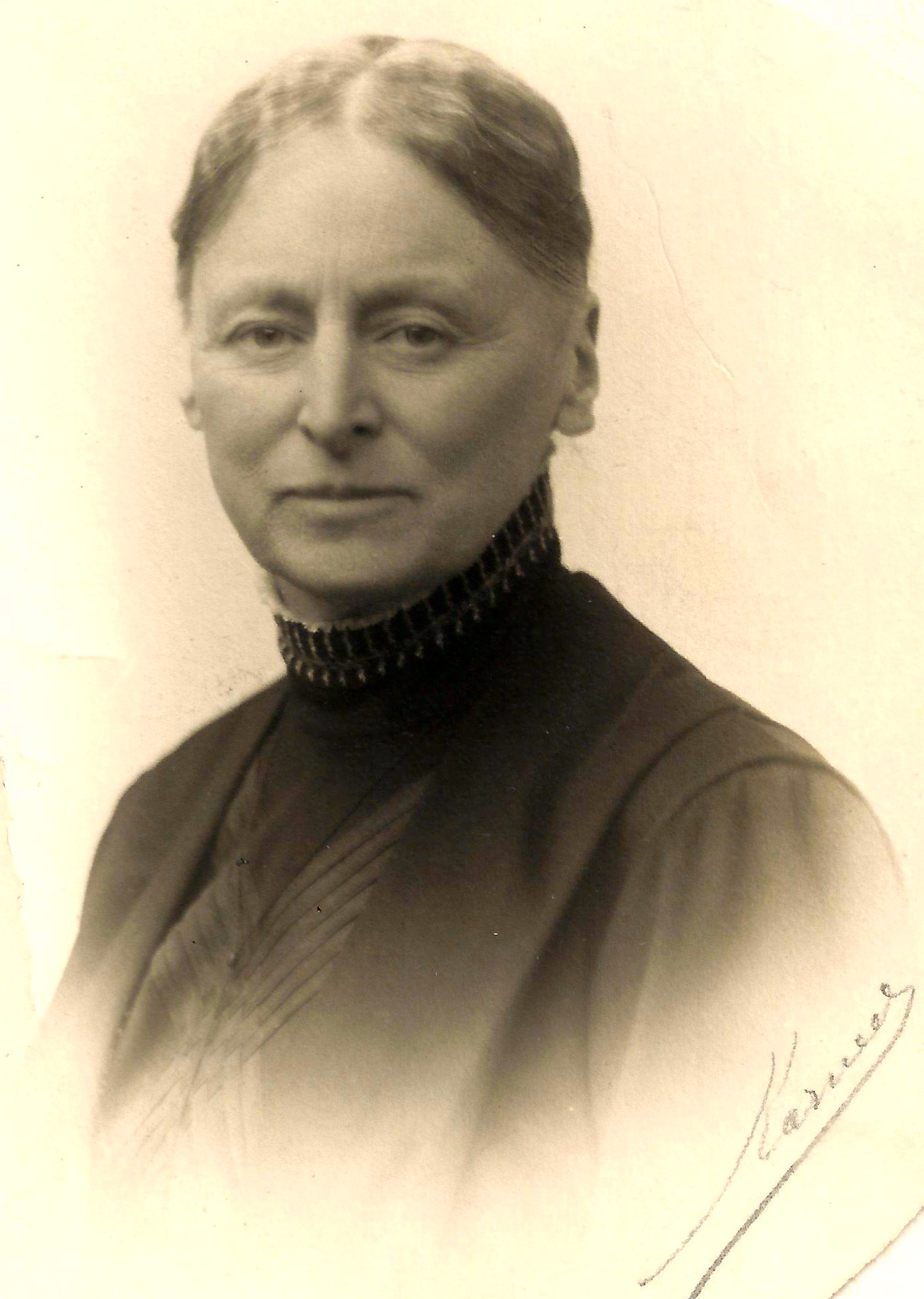
Beatrice Dickson (c.1909)

Cecilia Elise Beatrice Dickson (31 March 1852 – 18 January 1941) was a Swedish philanthropist and a pioneering temperance activist in Gothenburg. In 1884, together with her mother, Dickson founded the Överås Blue Cross Association (Öfverås Blåbandsförening), Sweden's first temperance society, serving as its secretary for 15 years. She also chaired the city's Kristliga Föreningen av Unga Kvinnor or YWCA from 1891 to 1916.

== Biography ==
Born on 31 March 1852 in Gothenburg, Cecilia Elise Beatrice Dickson was the youngest child of James Dickson and Eleonore Willerding. Brought up in one of the city's most affluent families, she was educated by her parents and her governess.

In the early 1880s, on an extended visit to England with her parents, she came into contact with those involved in the most important social developments of the times, including the YWCA and the housing projects for the poor in London's East End. She cultivated friendships with Catherine Booth and Agnes Welin, both leading philanthropists, who inspired her future work and her interest in encouraging temperance for the working classes.

On returning to Sweden, together with her mother she founded Sweden's first temperance society on her parents' estate in the Örgryte district of Gothenburg. She also established Föreningen Unga arbeterskors vänner (Friends of Young Workers Christian Association). Dickson also supported temperance activities at the national level, spending considerable time on lecturing around the country.

From 1906 to 1917, she served on the board of the so-called Gothenburg System, a non-profit establishment set on reducing consumption of alcohol. It later led to the Systembolaget liquor stores in Finland and Sweden.

She was awarded the Illis quorum in 1916.

Beatrice Dickson died on 18 January 1941. She is buried in Gothenburg's Östra kyrkogården.
