= Erik Mesterton =

Swedish author, literary critic and translator

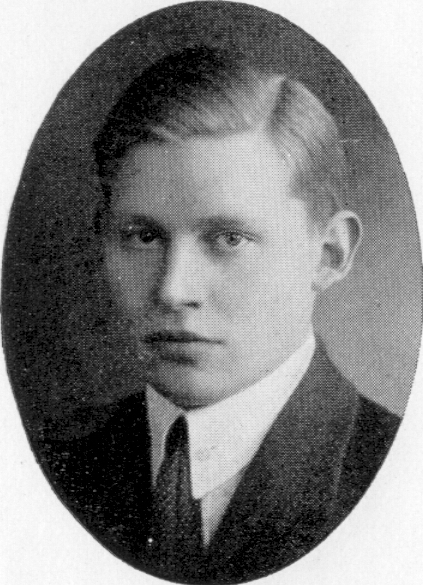
Erik Mesterton

Erik Mesterton (4 October 1903 – 10 January 2004) was a Swedish writer, literary critic and translator.

Together with poet Karin Boye he was editor for the influential culture magazine Spektrum in the 1930s (Modernist (T. S. Eliot was a favourite) and Freudian readings of literature were introduced. Mesterton lived in Gothenburg where he also did research on literature with scholars from the University of Gothenburg.

Mesterton's translation of Eliot's The Waste Land ("Det öde landet", 1932), made in collaboration with Karin Boye, and his essays in Spektrum was widely influential on Swedish 20th century literature.

Mesterton also translated from several other languages, including works by the Polish poet Zbigniew Herbert, and translated Swedish authors such as Pär Lagerkvist to English. In 1967, he re-translated Hamlet to Swedish in collaboration with Erik Lindegren.

== Selected translations ==
- Akhmatova, Anna: "Åtta dikter" (översatt tillsammans med Ebba Lindqvist. I tidskriften BLM, årg. 32 (1963): s. 350–355
- Eliot, T.S.: "Det öde landet" (översatt tillsammans med Karin Boye). Först i tidskriften Spektrum, 1932: 2, s. 25–44; omtryckt i Eliot, T.S.: Dikter (Bonnier, 1942), s. 17–37
- Eliot, T.S.: Sweeney Agonistes (översatt tillsammans med Erik Lindegren) (Bonnier, 1950)
- Erdman, Nikolai: En självmördares vedermödor: komedi (Samoubijca) (otryckt översättning, tillsammans med Tord Bæckström, för Göteborgs stadsteater 1969)
- Herbert, Zbigniew: I stridsvagnens spår: dikter 1956–1965 (översatt tillsammans med Erik Lindegren) (Bonnier, 1965)
- Herbert, Zbigniew: Rapport från en belägrad stad och andra dikter (tolkning av Agneta Pleijel och Daniel Bronski under medverkan av Erik Mesterton) (Bonnier, 1985)
- Lagerkvist, Pär: The eternal smile (Det eviga leendet) (översatt tillsammans med Denys W. Harding) (1934)
- Lagerkvist, Pär: Guest of reality (Gäst hos verkligheten) (översatt tillsammans med Denys W. Harding) (1936)
- Shakespeare, William: Hamlet (översatt tillsammans med Erik Lindegren) (Bonnier, 1967)
