= Cecilia Gyllenhammar =

Swedish author (born 1961)

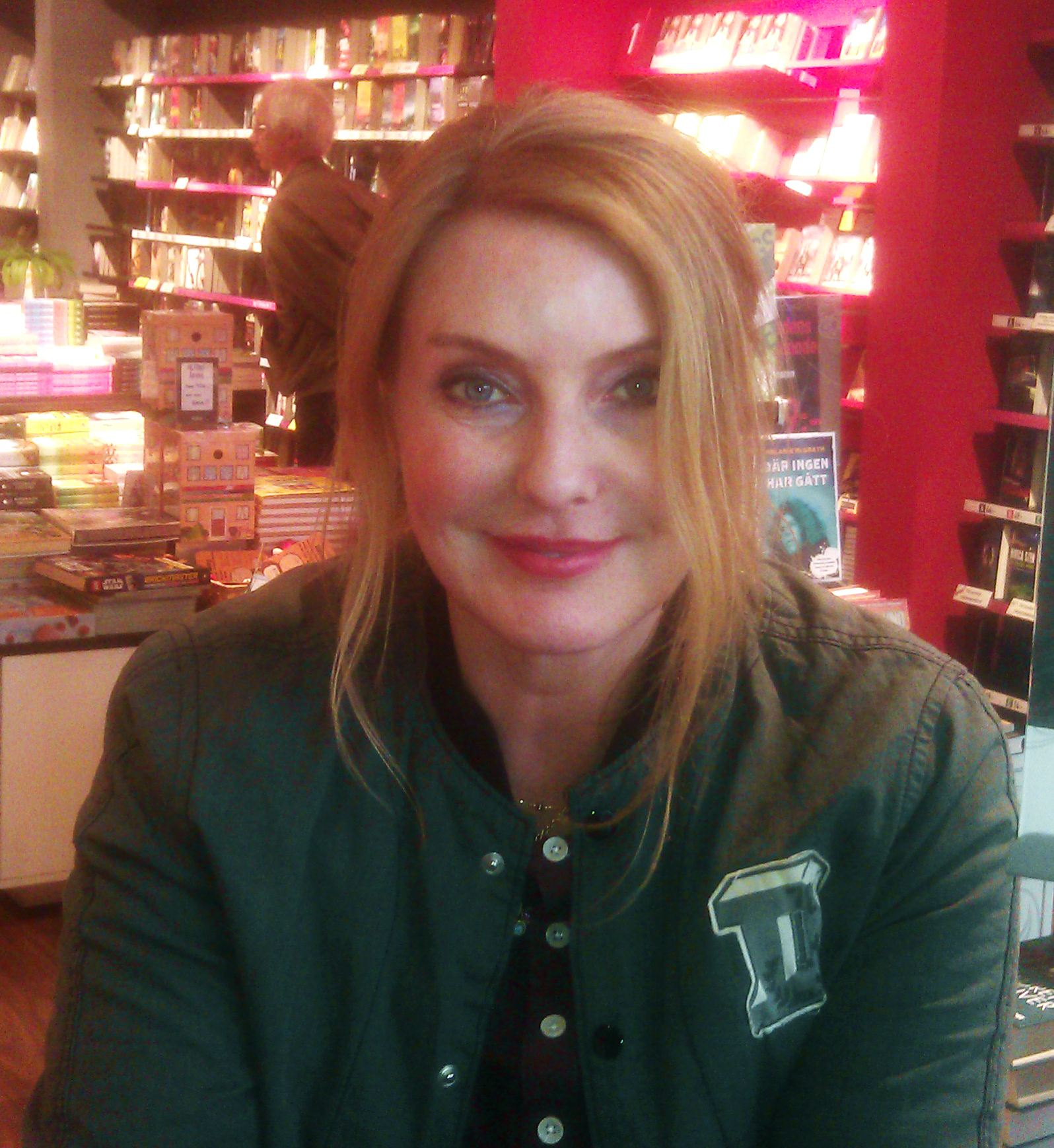
Cecilia Gyllenhammar.

Anne Cecilia Gyllenhammar (born 10 August 1961) is a Swedish author.

== Family ==
Gyllenhammar was born in Gothenburg. Cecilia Gyllenhammar has two sisters, Charlotte Gyllenhammar and Sophie Gyllenhammar Mattson, and a brother, Oscar Gyllenhammar. She was married to documentary film director Fredrik von Krusenstjerna between 1995 and 2008, and is the mother of three children. The oldest daughter of Pehr G. Gyllenhammar, CEO of Volvo 1970–1994, and Christina (née Engellau), she grew up as the "Princess of Gothenburg". She gave up both studies in the US and a career as a journalist before devoting herself to her children.

== Career ==
Her novel En spricka i kristallen ("A crack in the crystal") published in 2004 tells the story of the childhood of "Suss", an upper class girl from Gothenburg and the daughter of a CEO. Many details in the novel are from Cecilia's own childhood, but the plot also contains purely fictional parts. In the novel, Suss suffers of bulimia and marries a documentary film director – details the author admits are from her own life, while the factuality of other details, such as the constantly unfaithful father and the mother who tells her desperate daughter to lose 15 kilos, signs a check and leaves, remains a secret. In an interview in 2007, she said "you make a choice when you tell about unpleasant things not meant to be public" and that she had lost contact with her parents.

As of 2007, her first novel has become a major success and is being turned into a film for Sveriges Television directed by Harald Hamrell and Cecilia von Krusenstjerna is working on a second novel which, she intends, will be written from the perspective a middle class person and deal with the benefits of having a lot of money and those who are dreaming of it.

== Bibliography ==
- En spricka i kristallen, April 2004, Bonnier Fakta, (ISBN 9185015199)
- Stäpplöperskan ISBN 9789174230376, Telegram, 2012
- Sängkammartjuven, ISBN 9789188429469, Bladh by Bladh, 2017
- Monologroman om en vänskap, ISBN 9789189850729, Ekström & Garay, 2024
