= Pappa Pellerin's Daughter =

1963 children's novel by Maria Gripe

- Author: Maria Gripe
- Original title: Pappa Pellerins dotter
- Language: Swedish
- Publisher: Bonniers
- Publication date: 1963

Pappa Pellerin's Daughter (Swedish: Pappa Pellerins dotter) is a 1963 children's novel written by Maria Gripe. Production began on a six-part television adaptation by 1972. The first episode premiered in December 1974. It was later adapted into a play by Sara Giese and staged at the Orion Theatre in 2025.

== Plot ==
Twelve-year-old Loella lives in a small cottage in rural Sweden with her twin baby brothers Rudolph and Conrad. She has never met her father; her mother Iris works at sea and is overdue to return. On the property she has a scarecrow she calls Pappa Pellerin; she regularly tends to him, even dressing him up for special occasions. She survives by foraging and with help from two elderly neighbours: friendly Adina (who brings food) and reclusive Fredrik (who leaves her mail in the scarecrow's pocket).

In a long-awaited letter, Iris tells Loella she has accepted a temporary job in America and that her friend Agda will foster the boys but Loella will be sent to live in a children's home for about a year. Loella is furious, tearing up the letter and telling Pappa Pellerin to scare Agda away if she comes. After Adina is hospitalised with a broken leg, Loella scavenges from the bakery bins; Fredrik also leaves her food with the scarecrow. When Agda and her husband Gösta finally do arrive, Loella overhears them talking about her father, how he apparently wanted her and is very similar to her. She drives the couple away, but they return with child welfare officials who enforce the new custody arrangement.

Inspired by Adina's letter suggesting that events happen for a reason, Loella becomes convinced she is in the city to meet her father. She gradually adjusts to her new life at the children's home run by Svea Sjöberg and attends school for the first time, while also being able to visit her brothers regularly. Meanwhile, she invents increasingly outlandish stories at school about her travelling father's letters, even procuring old foreign stamps to support her lies. When a classmate exposes a supposed letter as a blank piece of paper, Loella insists they are written in invisible ink but becomes ashamed of herself.

Loella's lively roommate Mona invites her to participate in a fortune-telling game using a glass. Loella twice asks the spirits when she will meet her father; the answer comes back both times as April. She anxiously awaits his appearance. On Walpurgis Night, she accompanies Mona out with some boys in hope that this is her last chance to meet him. After a minor car accident, the police return her and Mona home just as April officially ends. Loella is devastated but decides she can only blame herself for wishful thinking.

Summer arrives. While packing her belongings, she comes across her Father's Day drawing and the expensive Christmas present she bought him, and discards both. After a farewell swim in the city fountain, Loella returns home with Rudolph and Conrad. Adina, now recovered, meets her at the closest train station. Back at the cottage, Loella is distressed to see that her beloved Pappa Pellerin has been replaced by an unfamiliar man. He says he has come to live with his daughter. She indignantly insists that has nothing to do with her, until he tells her his daughter's name: Loella.
