= Östra kyrkogården, Gothenburg =

Cemetery in Sweden

Coordinates: 57°42′55″N 12°0′50″E

Östra kyrkogården
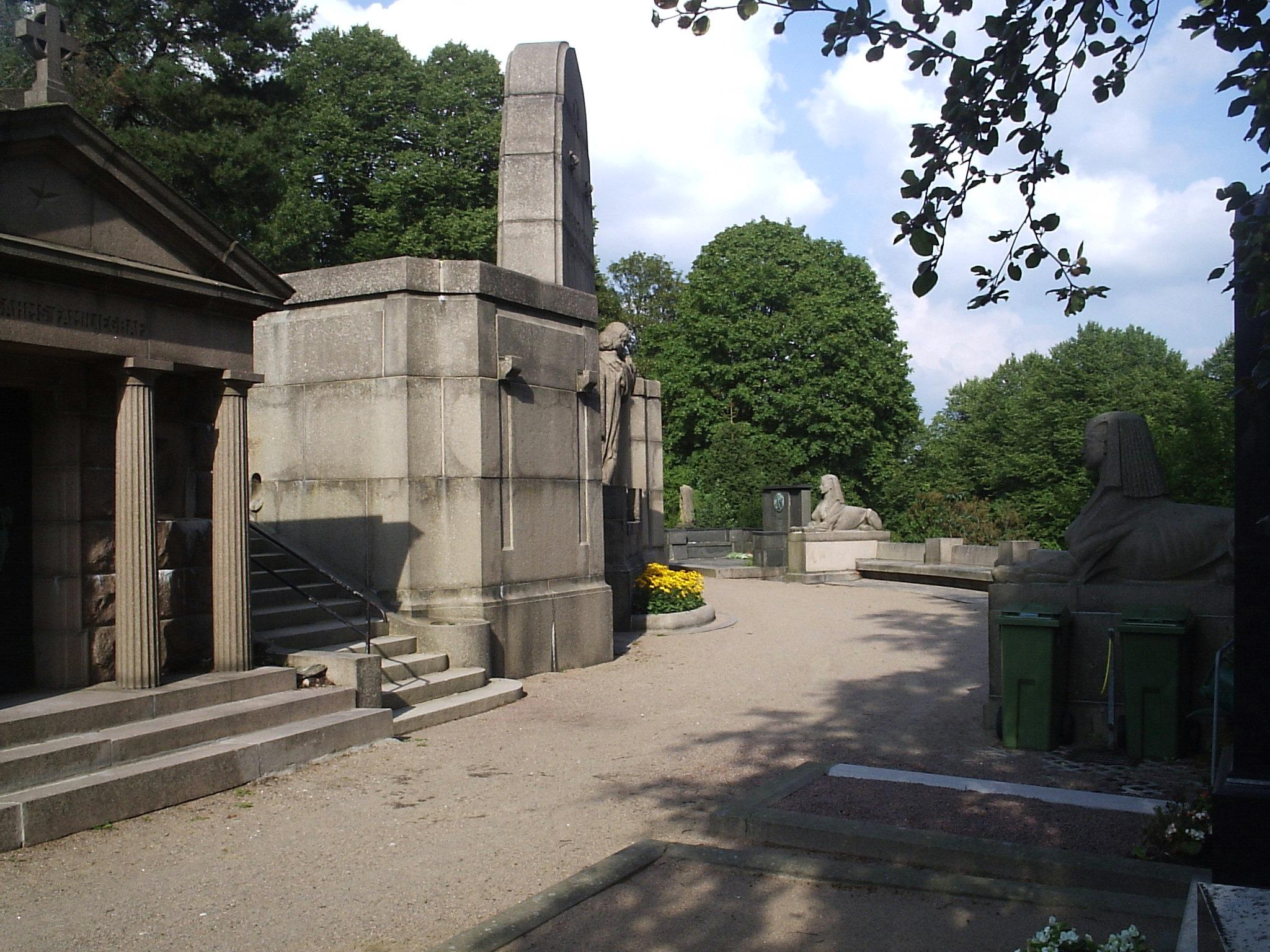
- One of the mausoleums at Östra kyrkogården.
- Interactive map of Östra kyrkogården

Details
- Established: 1860
- Location: Gothenburg
- Country: Sweden
- Owned by: Church of Sweden
- Size: 25.3 hectares (63 acres)
- No. of graves: 18,000
- No. of interments: 150,000
- Website: Official website

Östra kyrkogården (English: Eastern cemetery) is a cemetery in Gothenburg, Sweden. It is located in the parish of Örgryte, in the Diocese of Gothenburg. With an area of 25.3 hectares (63 acres), and nearly 18,000 graves, it is the third largest graveyard in the city. Including the urns, it is estimated to be the resting place of 150,000 people. The cemetery houses the graves of many notable citizens of Gothenburg, whose work and donations helped shape the city. Many of their tombstones and monuments are stately works of art.

A Jewish burial site is located at the southern end of the cemetery.

== History ==
The land for the cemetery was bought for 60,000 riksdaler from the owner of the Bagaregården estate. The cemetery was designed by architect J. H. Strömberg and inaugurated on 16 November 1860 by dean Peter Wieselgren under the name Begravningsplatsen ("The Burial Place"). The first burial took place on 27 February 1861; a twenty-year old young man named Frans Ludvig Moberg. During the first year of operation, 348 adults and 648 children were buried there, as measles and diphtheria were raging in the city.

In 1890, the first crematory in Gothenburg was opened, designed by Swedish architect Hans Hedlund. It burned down on 23 December 1920, but was rebuilt. However, it was closed in 1951, and its functions were taken over by the crematory in the nearby district of Kviberg.

== Notable interments ==
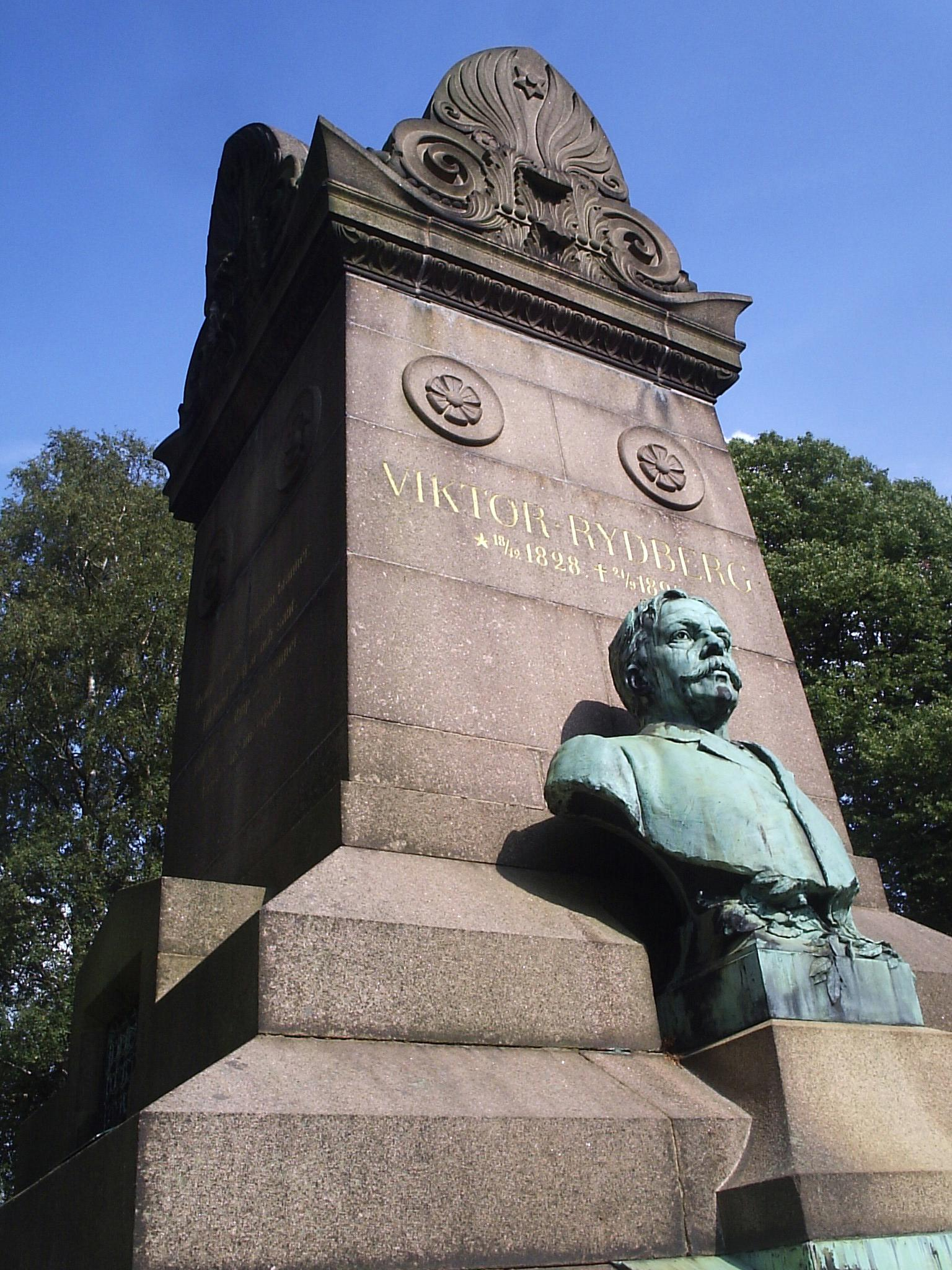
The tombstone of Viktor Rydberg

- Ivar Arosenius (1878–1909), painter
- Albert Ulrik Bååth (1853–1912), poet
- Karin Boye (1900–1941), poet
- Dan Broström (1870–1925), Swedish Naval Minister from 1914 to 1917
- Beatrice Dickson (1852–1941), temperance activist
- Bengt Erland Fogelberg (1786–1854), sculptor
- Pehr Gyllenhammar (1901–1988), Swedish insurance company executive
- Sven Adolf Hedlund (1821–1900), politician, founder of the Gothenburg Museum
- Oscar Kjellberg (1870–1931), engineer, inventor, and founder of ESAB
- Eric Lemming (1880–1930), athlete
- Erik Lönnroth (1910–2002), historian
- Otto Nordenskiöld (1869–1928), Finnish and Swedish geologist, geographer, and polar explorer
- Sven Renström (1793–1869), politician
- Viktor Rydberg (1928–1895), writer
- Sven Rydell (1905–1975), footballer
- Carl Skottsberg (1880–1963), botanist
