= Leif Björk =

Swedish economist, author and translator

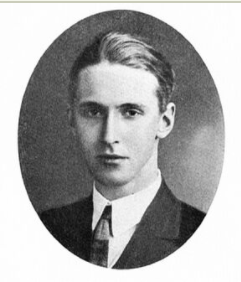
- Born: Leif Strindar Björk; 29 November 1907; Stockholm, Sweden
- Died: 9 June 2000 (aged 92)
- Education: Uppsala University
- Spouses: Karin Boye (m. 1929; div. 1933) Marianne Hellström (m. 1940; div. 1950)

Strindar Leif Björk (29 November 1907 – 9 June 2000) was a Swedish economist, author and translator. He was a member of Clarté.

== Bibliography ==
All publications are Swedish editions.

- Sparande och sparpropaganda: en studie utarbetad i anledning av Svenska sparbanksföreningens avdelnings för sparpropaganda 10-åriga verksamhet, 1936
- Svensk socialpolitik 1933–1937, 1937
- Det svenska samhället, 1939
- Om subjektivismen inom Stockholmsskolan, 1990
