= Anders Wall =

Swedish businessman (born 1931)

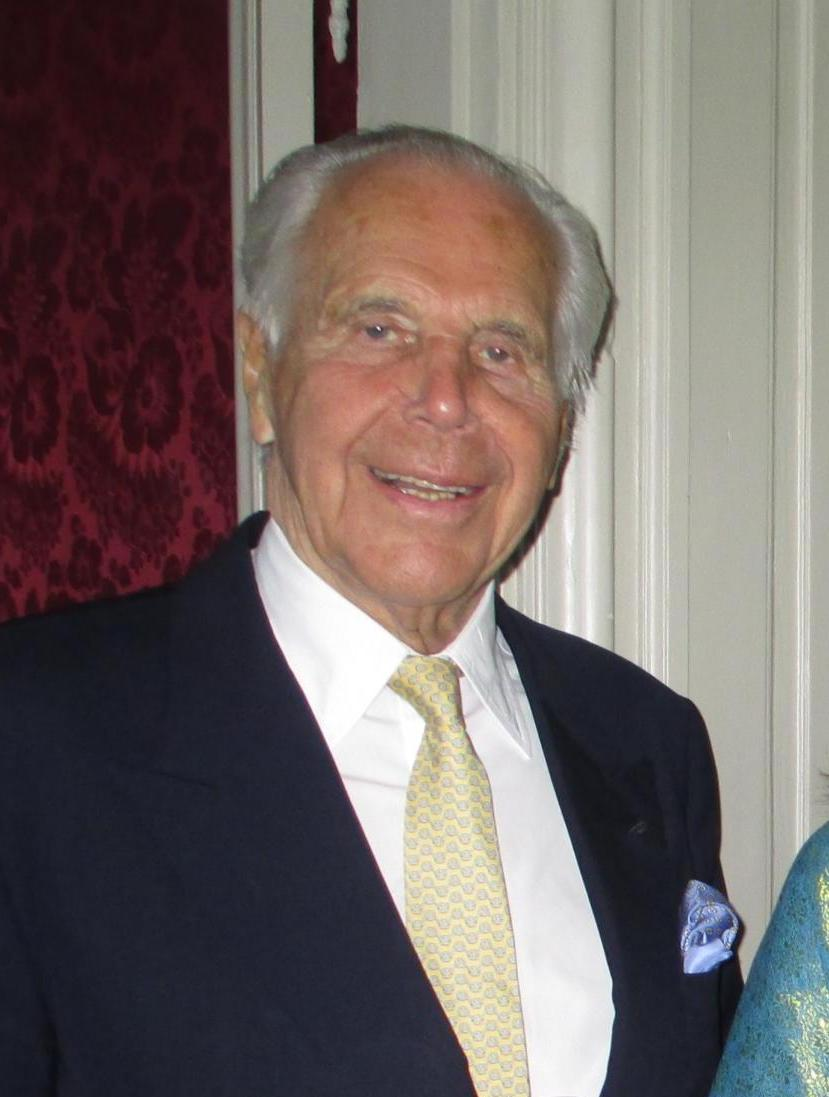
- Wall in 2016.
- Born: Karl Anders Andersson; 10 March 1931 (age 95); Giresta, Sweden
- Education: Stockholm School of Economics
- Title: Chairman of Volvo
- Term: 1981–1983
- Spouse(s): Ann Regnér (m. 1958; div. 1979) Charlotte Palmstierna (m. 1985)
- Children: Johan (b. 1964) and Åsa (b.1969)

Karl Anders Wall (born Andersson; 10 March 1931) is a Swedish businessman, the former chairman of Volvo.

Anders Wall was born in 1931. He graduated from Katedralskolan in Uppsala in 1952 and was educated at the Stockholm School of Economics.

Business positions
Preceded by Tore Browaldh	Chairman of the board of Volvo; 1981–1983	Succeeded by Pehr G. Gyllenhammar
