= Crisis (Boye novel) =

1934 autobiographical novel by Karin Boye

- Author: Karin Boye
- Original title: Kris
- Translator: Amanda Doxtater
- Language: Swedish
- Published: 1934
- Publisher: Bonniers, Norvik Press
- Publication place: Sweden

Crisis (Swedish: Kris) is a 1934 autobiographical novel by Karin Boye. Amanda Doxtater's English translation of Crisis was published in January 2020 by Norvik Press.

== Plot ==
Malin Forst, a young woman studying to become a teacher in Stockholm during the 1930s, suffers a religious crisis and becomes infatuated with her female classmate.

== Play adaptation ==
The novel was adapted into a play by Maja Salomonsson that premiered in 2022 at The House of Culture in Vällingby. The production, starring Beri Gerwise and Frida Beckman was praised by Pia Huss in Dagens Nyheter and Sara Granath in Svenska Dagbladet.
