= Kallocain =

1940 novel by Karin Boye

- Author: Karin Boye
- Language: Swedish
- Genre: Dystopian, political, social science fiction
- Publisher: Bonniers
- Media type: Print
- Pages: 220
- ISBN: 978-0-29903894-6

Kallocain is a 1940 dystopian novel by Swedish novelist Karin Boye that envisions a future of drab terror. Seen through the eyes of the idealistic scientist Leo Kall, Kallocain is a depiction of a totalitarian world state. An important aspect of the novel is the relationships and connections between the various characters, such as the marriage of the main character and his wife, Linda Kall, and the feelings of jealousy and suspicion that may arise in a society with heavy surveillance and legal uncertainty.

Kallocain was well received by contemporary Swedish critics on its publication in 1940. It has since been published in numerous Swedish editions and has been translated into more than 25 languages; English-language translations include those by Gustaf Lannestock (2002, University of Wisconsin Press) and David McDuff (2019, Penguin Classics). It was adapted into a television miniseries in 1981 by Hans Abramson.

In 2016, the novel was nominated for the Retro-Hugo award for the best science fiction novel of 1941.

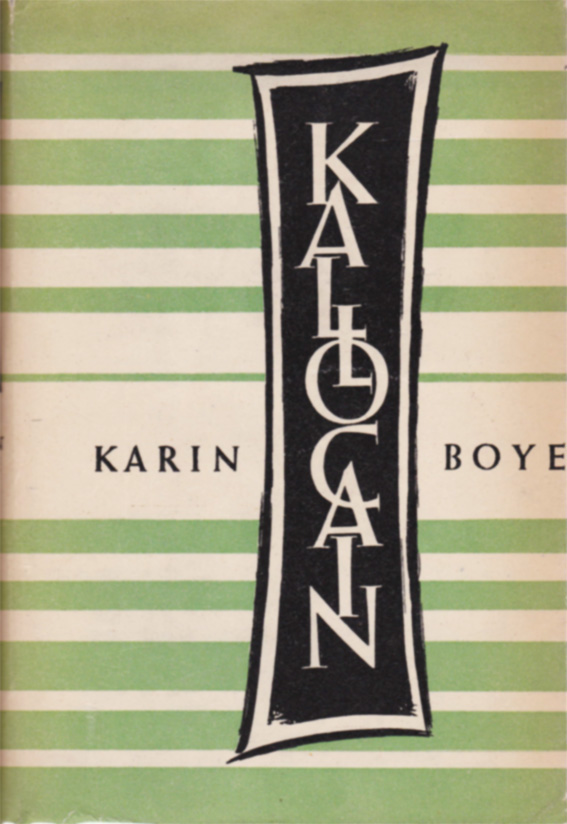
German first edition, 1947

== Background ==
Kallocain was inspired by the contemporary events in the Soviet Union and Nazi Germany in the 1930s. Boye began writing the novel in 1939 and finished it in summer 1940. The novel was part of Boye's ambition to fight totalitarianism and was totally different from anything she had written before. In Kallocain, Boye incorporated her own world view based on her experiences of Christianity and the church, her commitment to the political left movement, the 1930s peace movement and feminism, the disillusioned knowledge of bureaucracy and official lies in the Soviet Union, and all she knew about the events in Nazi Germany. Her recent reading of Franz Kafka was a likely literary influence, as were short stories by Pär Lagerkvist published in the 1930s. Similarities between Kallocain and Yevgeny Zamyatin's 1920 novel We have often been pointed out, but according to Boye's biographer Johan Svedjedal there is nothing that indicates that Boye was aware of We when she wrote the novel.

== Plot ==
The novel is set sometime in the 2000s, the plot centers on Leo Kall and is written in the form of a diary or memoir. Kall lives with his wife, Linda Kall, in a city intended for chemical industry. Leo is a scientist, who is initially very loyal to the government and develops the truth drug Kallocain. It has the effect that anyone who takes it will reveal anything, even things of which they were not consciously aware.

Major themes include the notion of the self in a totalitarian state, the meaning of life, and the power of love. Another central theme is the criminalization of thoughts. Oneself is not an individual, rather a part of the state. And through the effects of Kallocain, the last sanctuary of self is invaded. Apart from the laboratory work and testing by Leo Kall, much of the novel takes place in the home of Leo and Linda.

== Critical reception ==
Upon its publication in 1940, Kallocain was greeted as a major work by contemporary Swedish critics. "Of international class" wrote Artur Lundkvist and Karl Ragnar Gierow called it “a significant and lasting work of art.”

In his introduction to the English translation in 1966, critic Richard B. Vowles wrote that Kallocain "deserves to take a secure place in the literature of dystopia among such novels as Aldous Huxley’s Brave New World and George Orwell’s 1984." Comparing it to the mentioned novels, Vowles stated that Kallocain differed from both of them in not being satirical as Brave New World, viewing it as more “sophisticated” but less detailed about the Worldstate's philosophy as in the "novel-of-idea and melodrama" 1984, and found a closer relation to Yevgeny Zamyatin's 1920 novel We. Vowles also noted that the novel was written by a poet: "Typically Karin Boye, in moments of intensity, resorts to the symbols of her poetry. Beneath the concrete expanses of the Worldstate lies the source spring of her lyricism."

In a 2023 review of the English translation, critic Ilana Masad stated that beyond the plot's "somewhat standard questions regarding freedom and its meaning, Boye manages to seed far more intimate themes.", "Relationships are the true heart of Kallocain: how intimacies shape us, how the presence of difference can free us, and how what is freely given between people is always so much more powerful and real than what is taken by force."
