= Syster Sol =

Swedish singer-songwriter (born 1983)

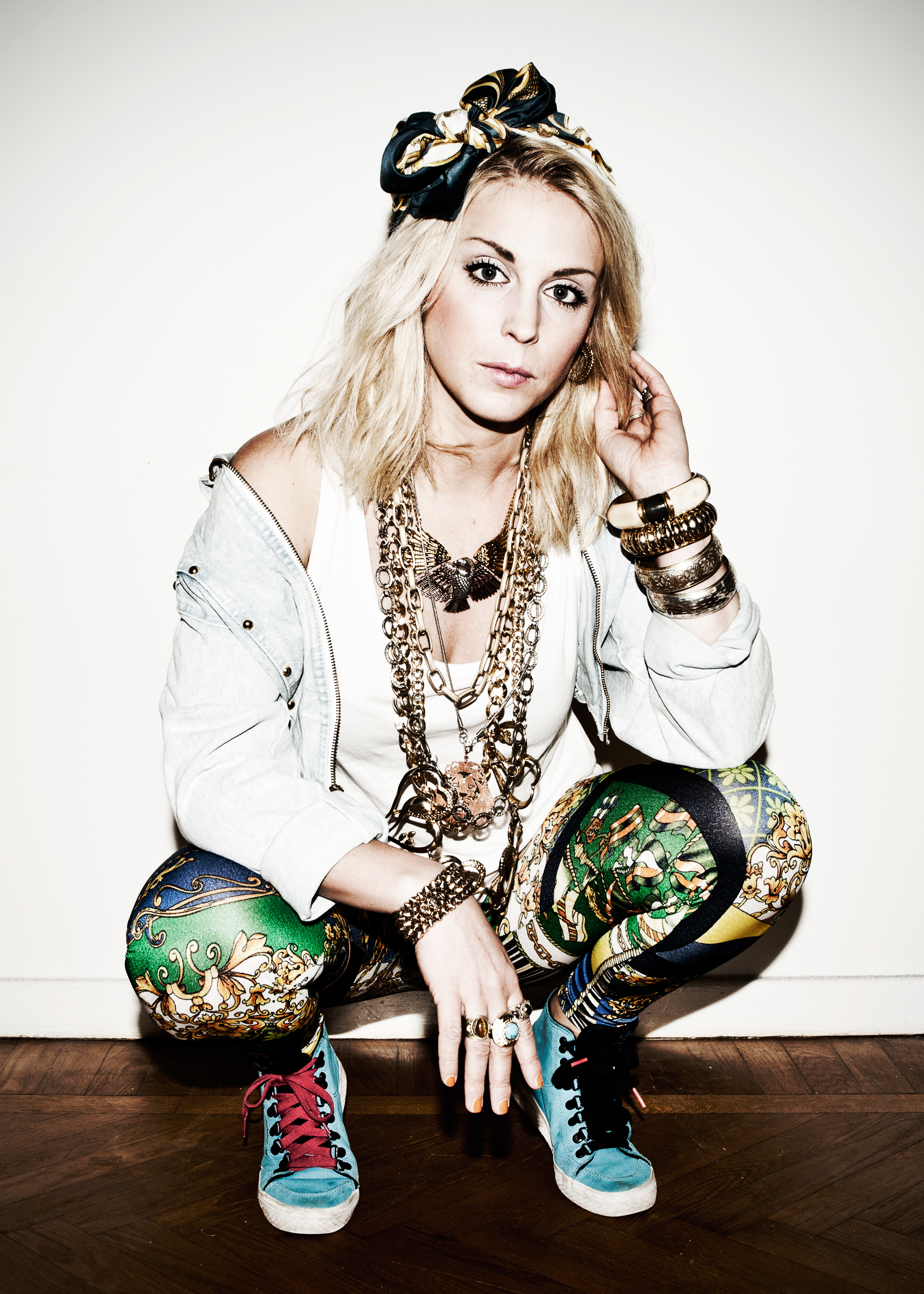
- Syster Sol in 2015
- Born: Isabel Sandblom; 25 January 1983 (age 42); Sollentuna, Sweden
- Occupation(s): Singer, songwriter, deejay

Isabel Sandblom (born 25 January 1983), known professionally as Syster Sol, is a Swedish reggae singer, songwriter, and deejay. She has a background as the founder and lead singer of the reggae band Livelihood. In 2008, she established herself as one of the first women solo singers in the reggae music scene in Sweden.

== Career ==
Sandblom was born in Sollentuna and took the performance name Syster Sol (English: Sister Sun) during her early years. As part of the reggae band Livelihood she released two albums, Escapizm (2006) and Sagans sånger (2007). The band dissolved in 2008, and she launched her solo career.

Her personal lyrics often refer to how young women in today's society have to be tough to get attention and respect. With these concerns in mind she is working with a youth project called Oneness Youth, which is intended to help young people feel better about themselves. She also works with the hip-hop and reggae workshop Tell Dem.

Syster Sol's debut music single Jag Gillar Din Vibe was released in the summer of 2008. Her first solo album, Dömd att bli bedömd, was released in February 2009 by the record label SwingKids. She has also collaborated with Cleo.

In 2010, she released the music single Mad Mad Mad and also a music video for the song. In 2011, her second music album, Kichinga, was released. At the 2014 Kingsizegala she won the award for Best Reggae/Dancehall of 2014.

In 2016, Syster Sol performed in the TV4 morning show Nyhetsmorgon twice; the first time with singer Kaliffa with whom she performed the song Kontakt, the second time with singer Pervane, a 16-year-old singer from Afghanistan, who had come to Sweden as a refugee.
