= Karin Boye =

Swedish poet and novelist (1900–1941)

- Karin Maria Boye
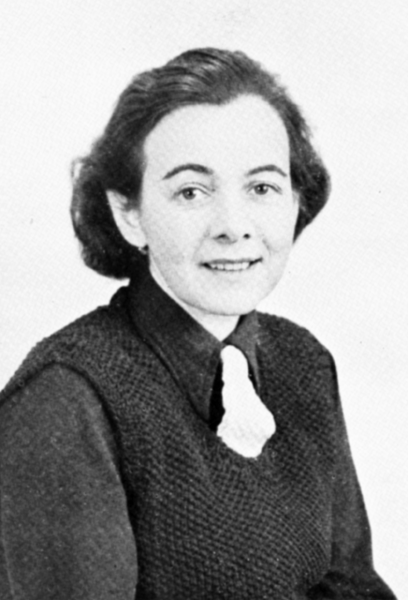
- Boye in the 1940s
- Born: 26 October 1900; Gothenburg, Sweden
- Died: 21 April 1941 (aged 40); Alingsås, Sweden
- Resting place: Östra kyrkogården, Gothenburg
- Spouse: Leif Björk (1929–1932)
- Partner: Margot Hanel (1934–1941)
- Writing career
- Language: Swedish
- Years active: 1922–1941
- Genres: novel, poetry, essay
- Notable works: "Yes, of course it hurts", Kallocain
- Website: www.karinboye.se

Karin Maria Boye (26 October 1900 – 24 April 1941) was a Swedish poet and novelist. In Sweden, she is acclaimed as a poet, but internationally, she is best known for the dystopian science fiction novel Kallocain (1940).

== Biography ==
=== Early life ===
Karin Boye as a child

Boye was born in Gothenburg, Sweden in a wealthy family and moved with her family to Stockholm in 1909, eventually settling in a house in Huddinge. In Stockholm, she studied at the Åhlinska skolan until 1920. She then attended Södra seminariet, a teacher-training programme, in order to become a school teacher. She studied at Uppsala University from 1921 to 1926 and debuted in 1922 with a collection of poems, Moln (Clouds). During her time in Uppsala and until 1930, Boye was a member of the Swedish Clarté League, a socialist group that was strongly antifascist. She was also a member of the women's organization Nya Idun.

=== Literary career ===
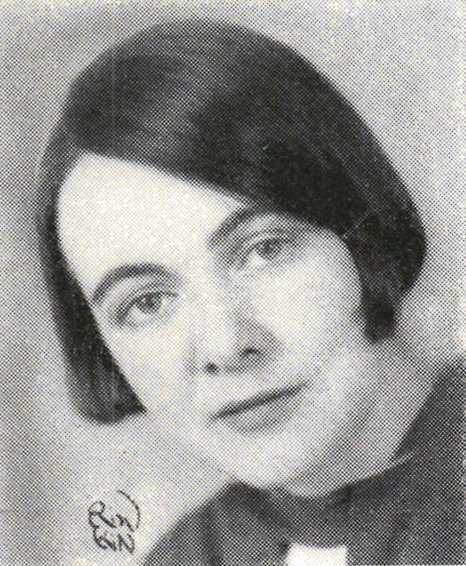
Karin Boye, early 1930s

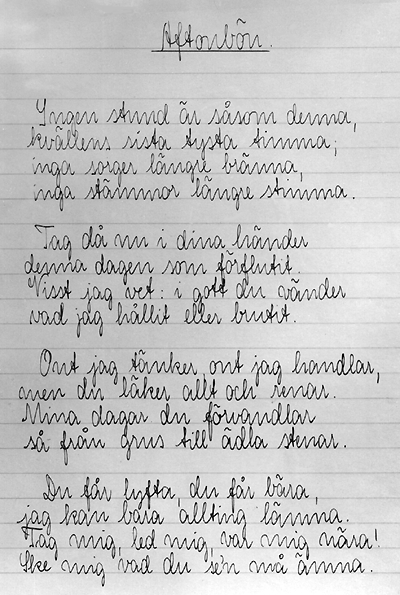
The poem "Aftonbön" handwritten by Karin Boye.

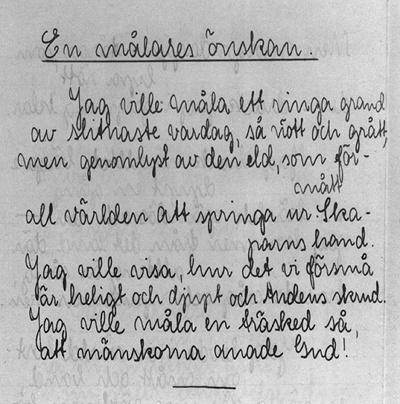
The poem "En målares önskan" handwritten by Karin Boye.

Boye made her literary debut in 1922 with the collection of poems Moln ("Clouds"). Taking influence from the writings of Arthur Schopenhauer and Friedrich Nietzsche and poets such as Gustaf Fröding, Vilhelm Ekelund and Edith Södergran, her poetry dealt from the start with the individual's right to freedom in relation to Christianity, which was further developed in "Gömda land" (1924, "Hidden Lands") and Härdarna (1927, "The Hearths"). Worship of beauty, fighting spirit and dynamic movement were central elements in her poems that was concentrated into a distinctive, idiosyncratic rhythmic form.

In 1931, Boye, together with Erik Mesterton and Josef Riwkin, founded the poetry magazine Spektrum, introducing T. S. Eliot and the Surrealists to Swedish readers. She translated many of Eliot's works into Swedish; she and Mesterton translated "The Waste Land". She was also a member of the Swedish literary institution Samfundet De Nio (The Nine Society) from 1931 until her death in 1941.

Boye is perhaps most famous for her poems, the most well-known of which are Ja visst gör det ont (Yes, of course it hurts) and I rörelse (In motion) from her collections of poems Härdarna and För trädets skull (1935, "For the tree's sake"). The latter collection, which prominently feature Boye's frequent use of tree-symbolism in her poetry, was criticized by contemporary critics for modernistic obscurity but is by later readers widely regarded as her strongest book of poems.

Boye also wrote several short story collections and novels. Her 1931 novel Astarte was a criticism of the bourgeois culture, and won a Nordic novel prize. Her 1934 novel Crisis (Kris) depicts her religious crisis and lesbianism. In her novels Merit vaknar (Merit awakens) and För lite (Too little) she explores male and female role-playing.

Her best-known and most widely read novel Kallocain was published in 1940. Inspired by her visit to Germany during the rise of Nazism, it was a portrayal of a dystopian society in the vein of George Orwell's Nineteen Eighty-Four and Aldous Huxley's Brave New World (though written almost a decade before Orwell's magnum opus). In the novel, an idealistic scientist named Leo Kall invents Kallocain, a kind of truth serum. The novel contrasts the individual's right to freedom and independence against a collective society and the state's need of organisation and control. The novel was filmed in Sweden in 1981 and was the main influence on the movie Equilibrium.

Posthumously, the uncompleted poetry collection De sju dödssynderna ("The seven deadly sins") was published in 1941. Its center-piece is a cycle of poems of the conflict between the individual's strong will to independence and the conformity of religion, which was the major theme in Boye's work.

=== Later life ===
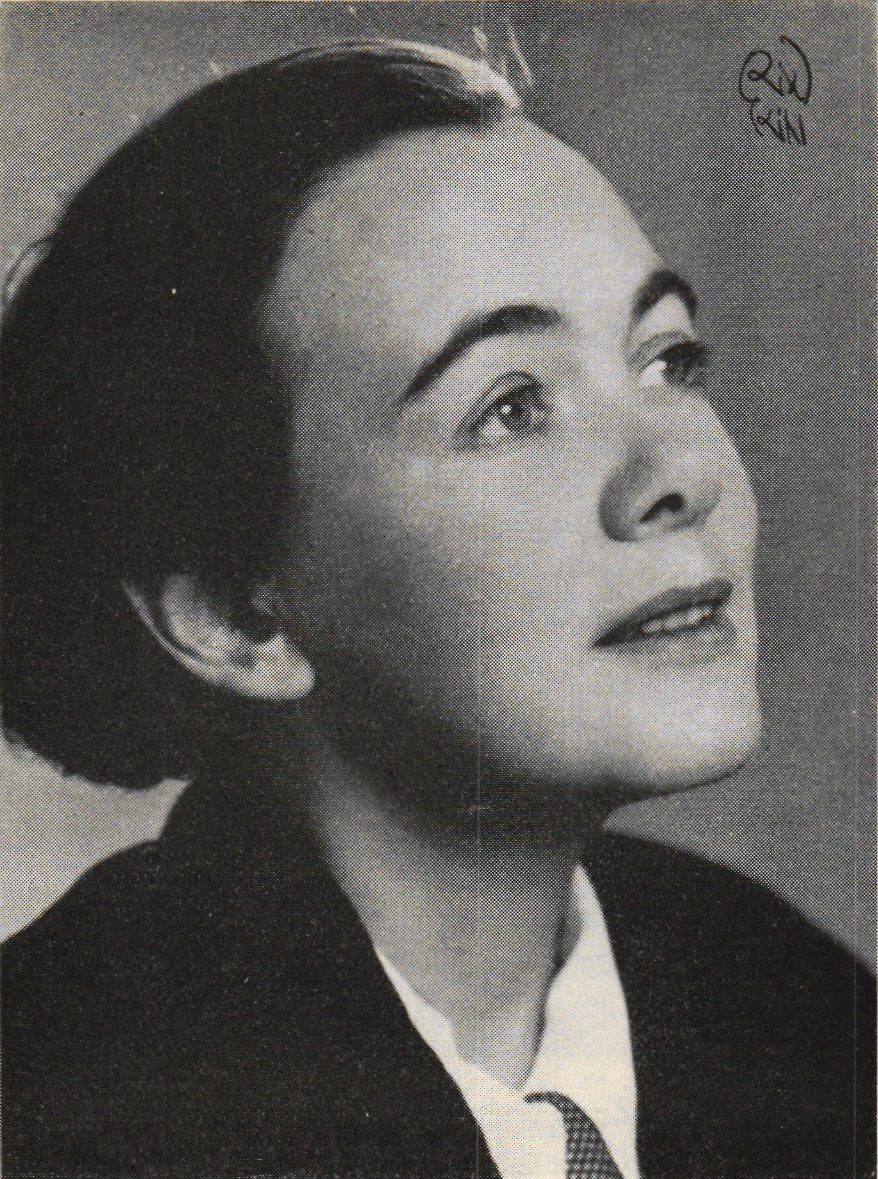
Karin Boye, 1930s

Between 1929 and 1932, Boye was married to another Clarté member, Leif Björck. The marriage was apparently a friendship union. In 1932, after separating from her husband, she had a lesbian relationship with Gunnel Bergström, who left her husband, poet Gunnar Ekelöf, for Boye. Following a bout of depression she left Stockholm for Berlin, where she went through psycho-analysis and affirmed her homosexuality. During the stay in Berlin in 1932–1933 she met Margot Hanel (7 April 1912 – 30 May 1941), whom she lived with for the rest of her life, and referred to as "her wife".

As Boye had resigned as editor of Spektrum she earned her living from translations and writing short stories for weekly magazines, and later also writing as a literary critic for the newspapers Arbetaren and Social-Demokraten. From 1936 to 1938 Boye was employed as teacher at Viggbyholm school, but suffered from periods of depression and suicide attempts.

From June 1940 Boye spent eleven months in Alingsås to care for her friend Anita Nathorst who was ill with cancer. This period during which Boye wrote the novel Kallocain and several prominent poems was one of the most productive in her literary career, while at the same time her depression worsened.

=== Death ===
On 23 April 1941 Boye disappeared from the house in Alingsås where she lived, taking sleeping pills with her. She was found dead on 27 April, curled up at a boulder on a hill with a view just north of Alingsås, near Bolltorpsvägen, by a farmer who was going for a walk. The boulder is now a memorial stone. Boye was buried on 4 May 1941 at Östra kyrkogården, Gothenburg. Margot Hanel also died by suicide shortly thereafter.

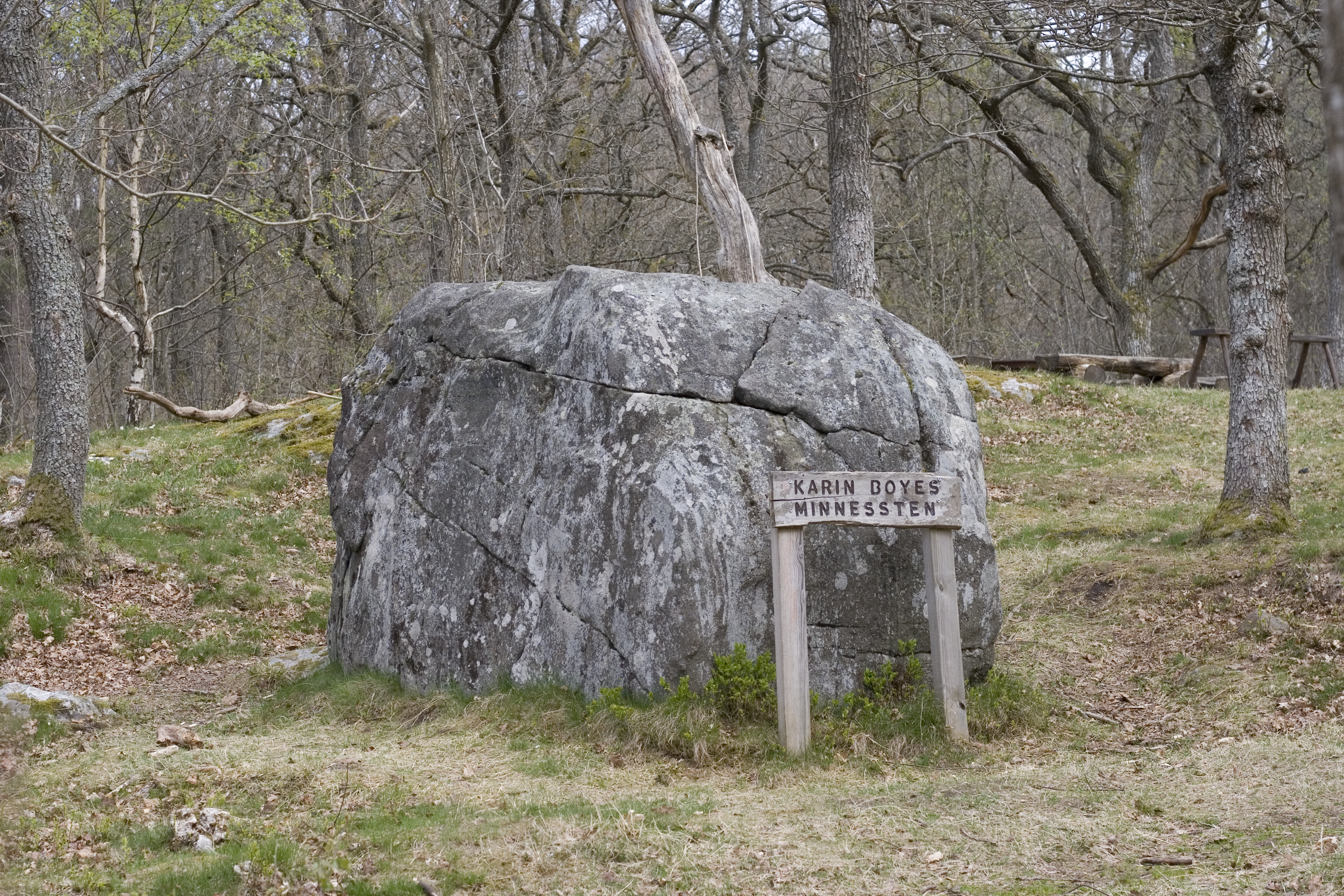
The stone in Alingsås where Karin Boye was found dead.

== Legacy ==
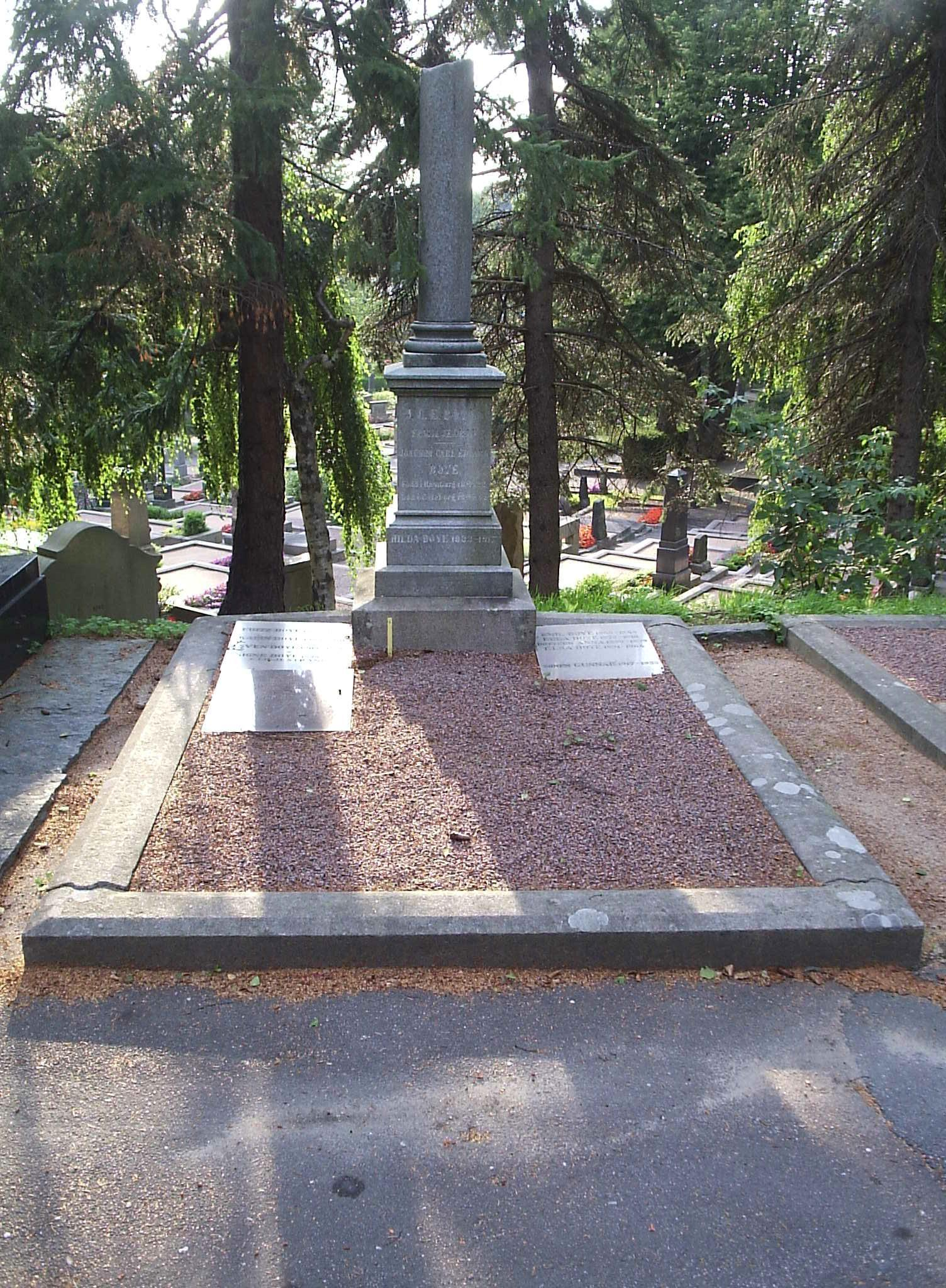
Karin Boye's grave at Östra kyrkogården, Gothenburg

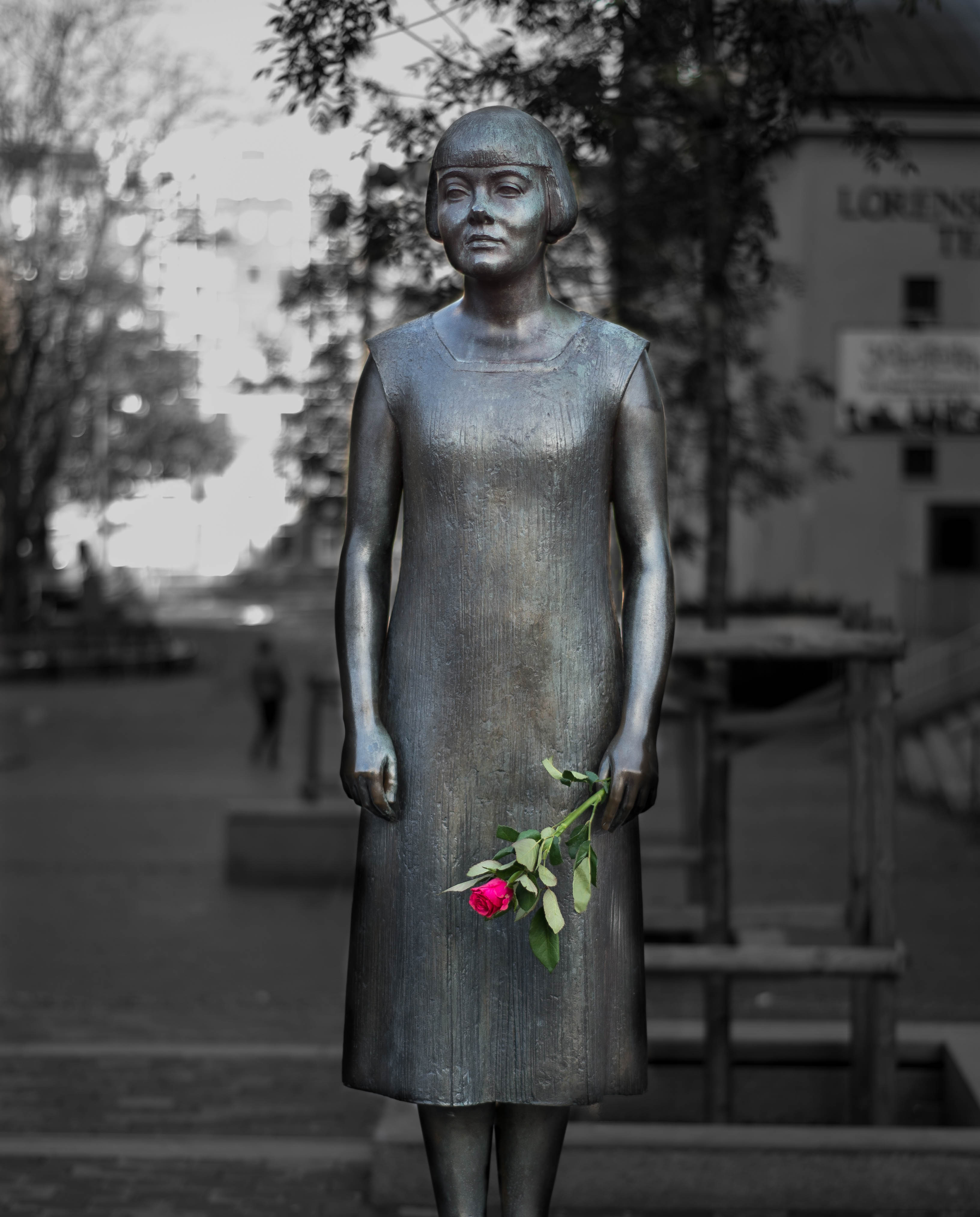
The statue of Boye on Kungsportsavenyn, outside the Gothenburg City Library (Stadsbiblioteket)

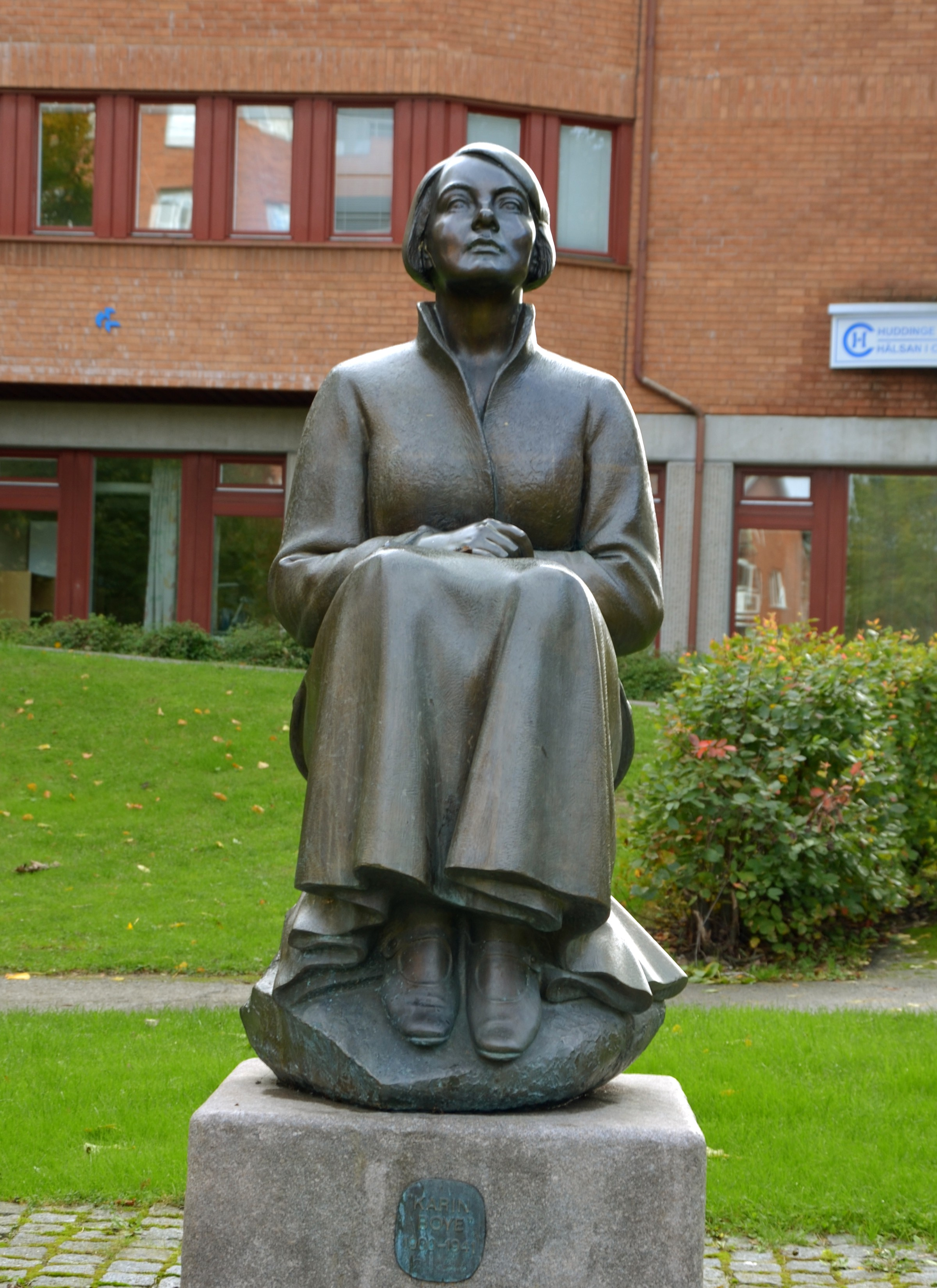
Statue of Karin Boye in Huddinge

Boye was given two very different epitaphs. The best-known is the poem Död amazon (Dead Amazon) by Hjalmar Gullberg, in which she is depicted as "Very dark and with large eyes". Another poem was written by her close friend Ebbe Linde and is entitled Död kamrat (Dead friend). Here, she is depicted not as a heroic Amazon but as an ordinary human, small and grey in death, released from battles and pain.

She is also model to the character Isagel in Harry Martinson's 1956 poem Aniara. Boye and Martinson had a close friendship in the 1930's.

Boye has been the subject of several biographies, numerous literary studies and articles, and her work have continuously been published in new Swedish editions. In 1994, her Complete Poems was published in English translation by David McDuff. Her most widely read book Kallocain has been translated to over 25 different languages.

A literary association dedicated to her work was created in 1983, keeping her work alive by spreading it among new readers. In 2004, one of the branches of the Uppsala University Library was named in her honour.

== Works ==
=== Novels ===
- Astarte, 1931
- Merit vaknar, 1933
- Crisis, 1934
- För lite, 1936
- Kallocain, 1940

=== Collections of poems ===
- Moln, 1922
- Gömda land, 1924
- Härdarna, 1927
- För trädets skull, 1935
- De sju dödssynderna, 1941 (not completed, posthumously published)
- Complete Poems in English translation by David McDuff, Bloodaxe Books, 1994 ISBN 9781852241094

== Sources ==
- Abenius, Margit. 1965. Karin Boye. Stockholm, Sweden. Bokförlaget Aldus/Bonniers. OCLC 185641329
- Hammarström, Camilla. 2001. Karin Boye. Stockholm, Sweden. Natur & Kultur. ISBN 9789127089358.
