= Cleo (Swedish singer) =

Swedish singer

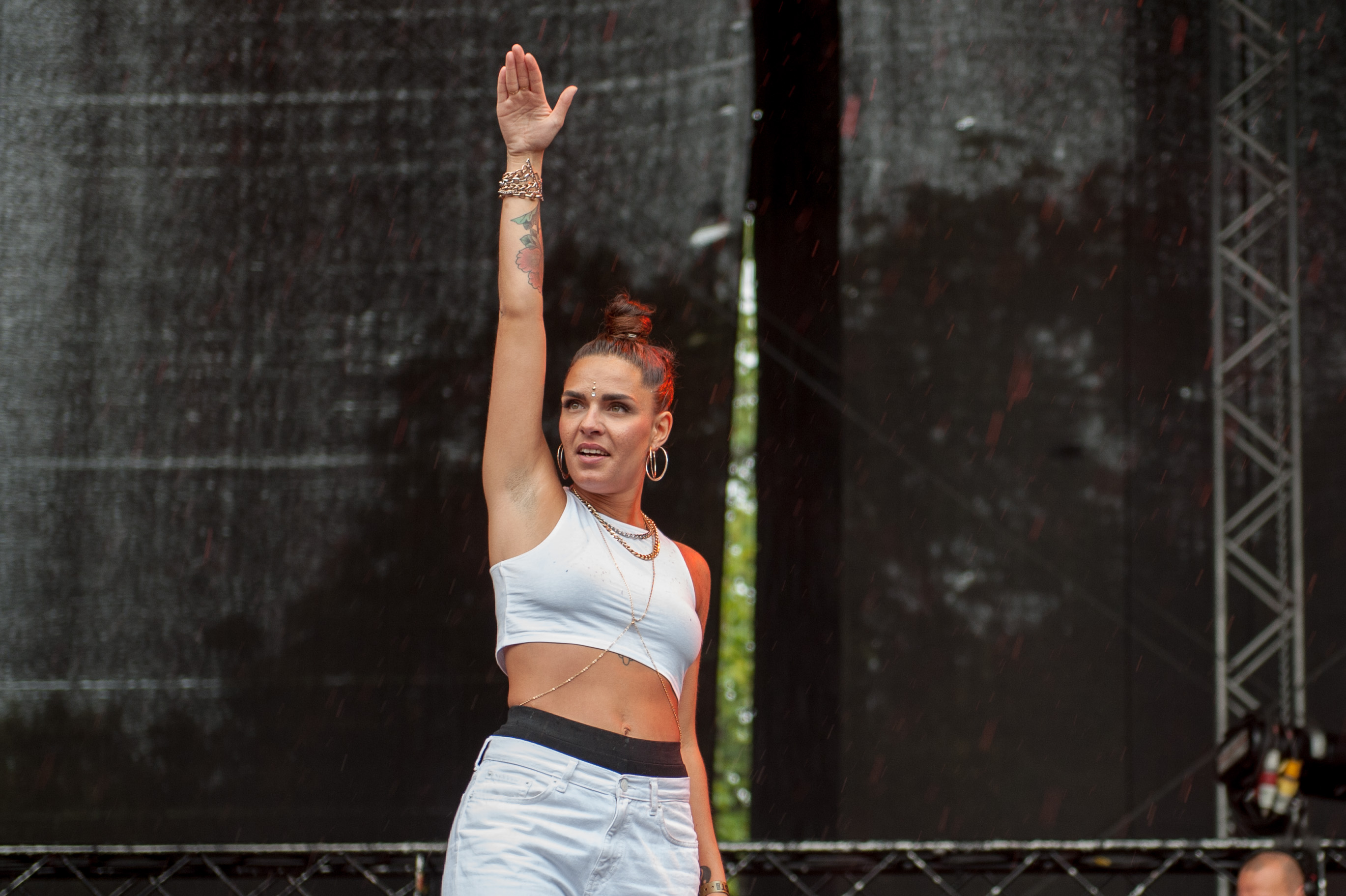
- Cleo in 2014
- Born: 5 September 1987 (age 38); Uppsala, Sweden
- Occupations: Singer, songwriter

Nathalie Missaoui (born 5 September 1987), better known by her stage name Cleo, is a Swedish rap artist, singer and songwriter. Cleo grew up in Umeå where she started rapping with the Random Bastards collective in the early 2000s. She is one of the founders of Femtastic, a music and culture network for women in Sweden. Along with Syster Sol she runs the hiphop and reggae-workshop Tell Dem.

In 2012, Cleo along with singer Jessica Folcker and Håkan Lidbo performed as an interval act, they performed Leila K's song "Electric" in Melodifestivalen of that year. In March 2013 she collaborated with the group Looptroop Rockers for the music single "Hårt mot hårt".

At the 2015 Kingsizegala, she won the award for Best live act of that year. On 19 June 2015, Cleo released her second music single called "240", along with guest singer Alina Devecerski.

== Discography ==
Albums

- Missaoui (2022) – No. 60 Sweden
