= Pehr Gyllenhammar =

Swedish insurance company executive (1901–1988)

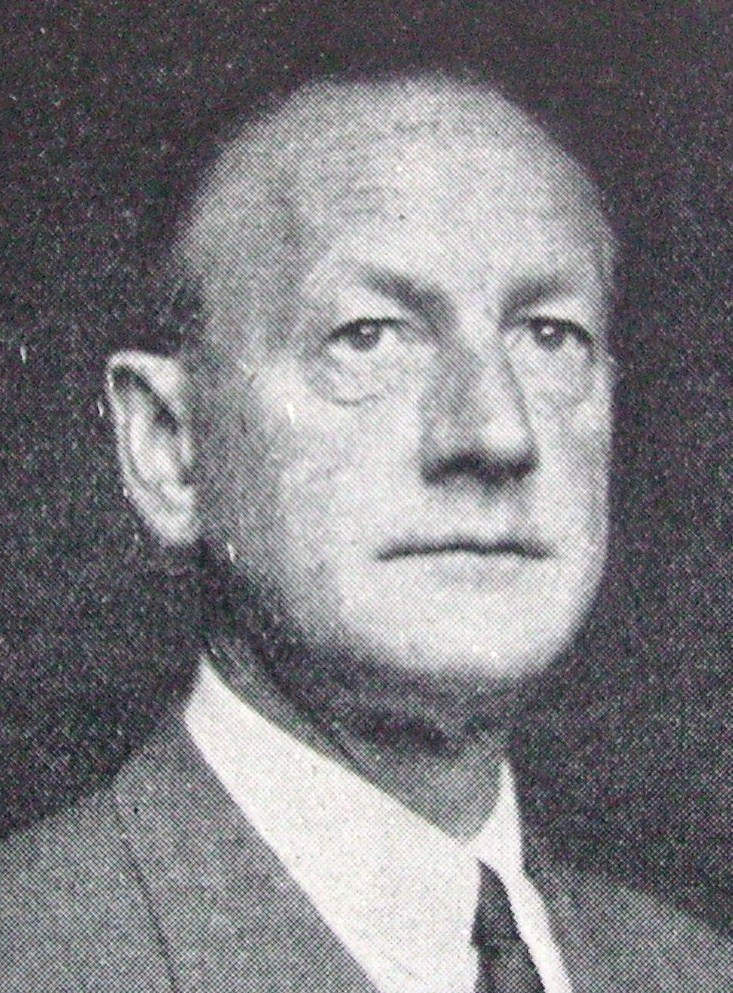
- Gyllenhammar in 1957
- Born: Pehr Gustaf Viktor Gyllenhammar; 23 April 1901; Gothenburg, Sweden
- Died: 22 November 1988 (aged 87); Gothenburg, Sweden
- Occupation: Company executive
- Spouse: Aina Kaplan (m. 1929)
- Children: 2, including Pehr G. Gyllenhammar

Pehr Gustaf Viktor Gyllenhammar (23 April 1901 – 22 November 1988) was a Swedish insurance company executive. He completed a law degree from Stockholm University in 1925, and became CEO of the insurance company Svenska Skeppshypotekskassan (the Swedish Ships' Mortgage Bank) in 1938. He was later CEO of the Swedish insurance company Skandia until 1970, when he was succeeded by his son, Pehr G. Gyllenhammar.

== Early life ==
Gyllenhammar was born on 23 April 1901 in Gothenburg, Sweden, the son of insurance company executive Per Gyllenhammar and Anne (née Engelhart). He passed studentexamen in Gothenburg in 1920 and earned a Candidate of Law degree from Stockholm University College on 25 April 1925. He did his clerkship in Askim judicial district from 1925 to 1928 and was an insurance and brokerage intern in Germany and England from 1928 to 1929.

== Career ==
Gyllenhammar was employed by the insurance company Svenska Skeppshypotekskassan (Swedish Ships' Mortgage Bank) from 1929 as an ombudsman and at the law firm Dr Philip Lemans Advokatbyrå in Gothenburg as an assistant lawyer from 1934 to 1940. In 1938 he became CEO of Svenska Skeppshypotekskassan.

He was employed by Sveriges allmänna sjöförsäkrings AB from 1941 and became the deputy CEO in 1942 and CEO from 1944 to 1947. Gyllenhammar was board member and deputy CEO of AB Argo from 1945 and its CEO from 1948 and well as CEO of Försäkrings AB Ocean from 1948 to 1962 and the Återförsäkrings AB Union from 1948. He was also CEO of Försäkrings AB Svea-Nornan from 1953 to 1961. Gyllenhammar was CEO of Försäkrings AB Svea from 1953 to 1961, Försäkrings AB Skandia in Stockholm from 1961 and Livförsäkrings AB Thule from 1964. Gyllenhammar was also CEO of Nordiska sjöförsäkringspoolen from 1952.

Gyllenhammar was also an accountant at Skandinaviska Enskilda Banken from 1945 and also chairman of the board of AB Lund & Michélsen from 1945 and board member of Lloyd's Register's Swedish commission from 1946. He was board member of: Sveriges allmänna sjöförsäkrings AB from 1943, AB Argo from 1945, Försäkrings AB Amphion-Æquitas from 1946, Återförsäkrings AB Skandia from 1946, Försäkrings AB Ocean from 1948, Återförsäkrings AB Union from 1948, AB Sjöassuranskompaniet from 1948, Sjöassuradörernas förening from 1948, Svenska försäkringsbolags riksförbund from 1950, Försäkringssällskapet i Göteborg from 1950 and Sjöförsäkrings AB Gauthiod from 1952.

Furthermore, Gyllenhammar was board member of Gothenburg Chamber of Commerce from 1954, AB Götaverken from 1955 to 1968, Försäkrings AB Svea from 1957, Pripp-bryggerierna AB from 1960, Försäkrings AB Skandia from 1961, Försäkrings AB Skåne, Skåne-Malmö from 1961, Sjöförsäkrings AB Ägir from 1962, Sjöförsäkrings AB Öresund from 1962 and Livförsäkrings AB Thule from 1963. He was also board member of Försäkringsbolagens förhandlarorganisation from 1964, the International Law Association's Swedish section from 1954, the Swedish Sea Rescue Society (Sjöräddningssällskapet) from 1954 and Anna Ahrenbergs fond from 1951. Gyllenhammar was a council member of Stockholm Chamber of Commerce from 1963. He was also chairman of Svenska tarifföreningen from 1955.

== Personal life and death ==
In 1929, Gyllenhammar married Aina Dagny Kaplan (1903–1995). He was the father of Anne (born 1930) and Pehr-Gustaf (born 1935).

Gyllenhammar died on 22 November 1988, at the age of 87. He was buried at Östra kyrkogården in Gothenburg.

== Awards ==
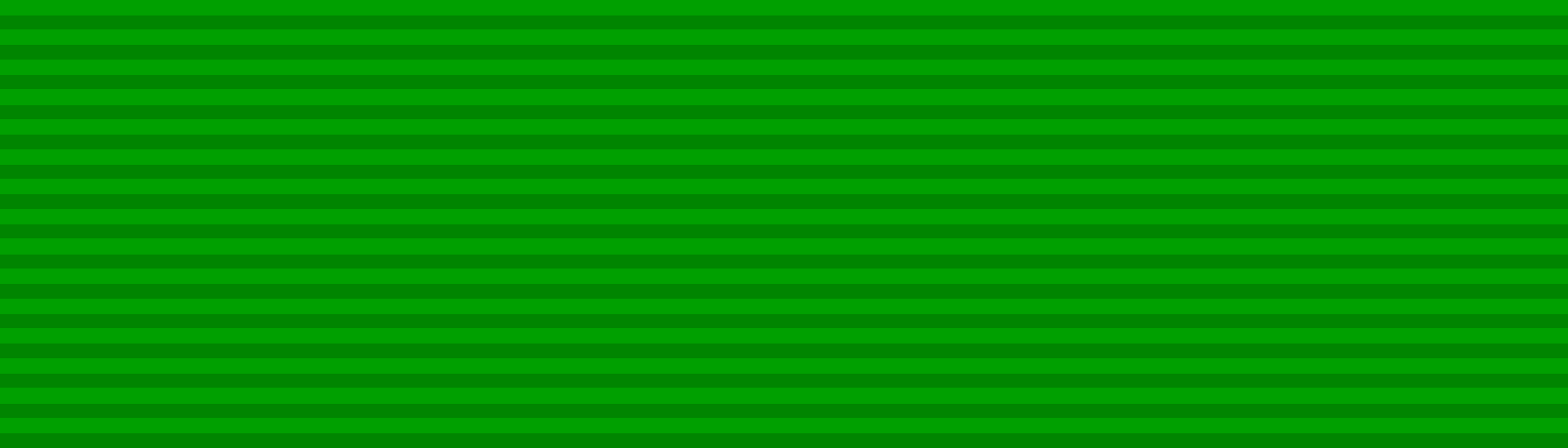
- (Sweden) Commander 1st Class of the Order of Vasa
