= Pehr G. Gyllenhammar =

Swedish businessman (1935–2024)

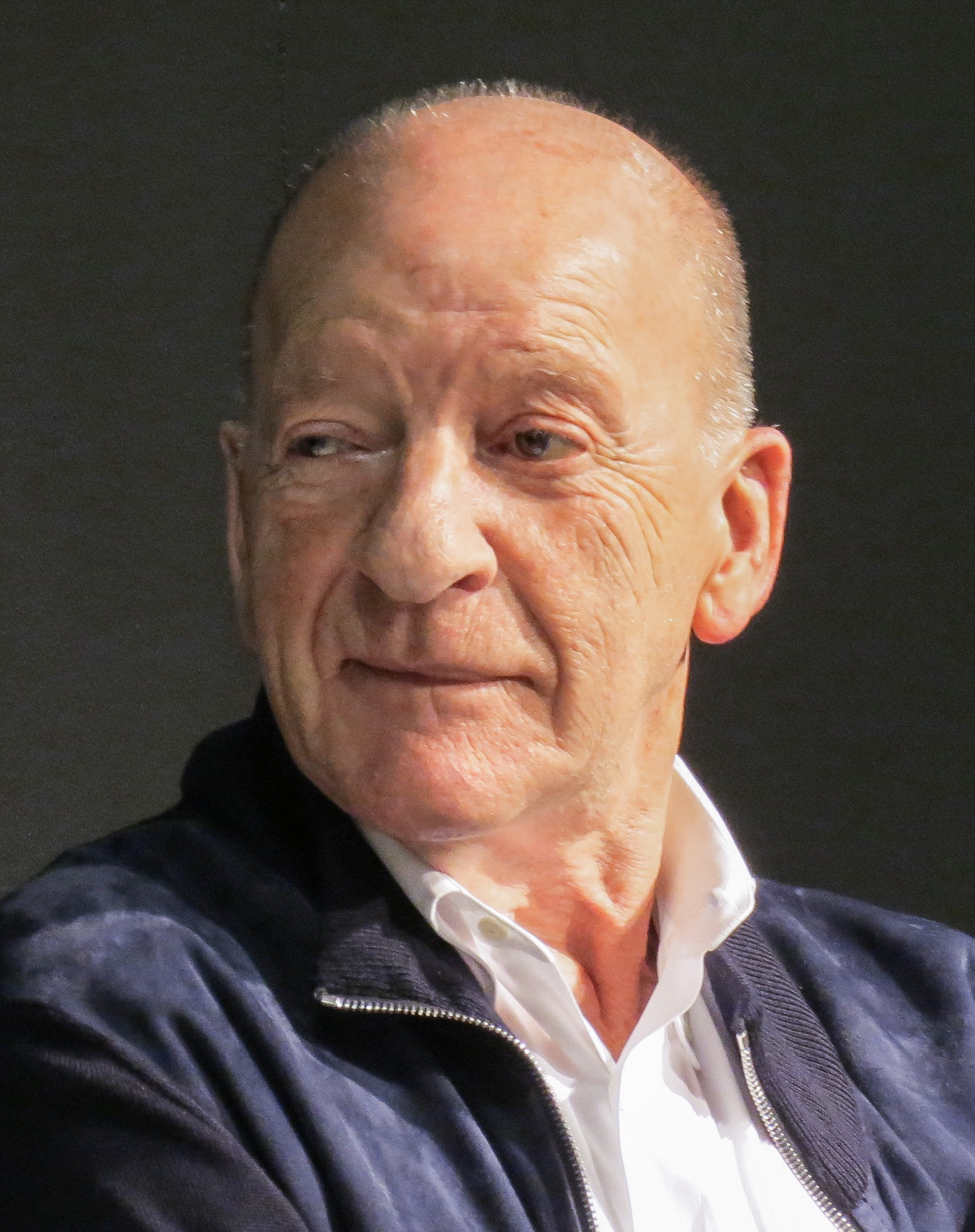
- Gyllenhammar in 2014
- Born: Pehr Gustaf Gyllenhammar; 28 April 1935; Gothenburg, Sweden
- Died: 21 November 2024 (aged 89); Toronto, Ontario, Canada
- Education: Lund University
- Employer: Volvo (1970–1993)
- Title: CEO of Volvo
- Term: 1971–1994
- Spouses: Christina Engellau (m. 1959; died 2008) Christel Behrmann (m. 2010; div. 2012) Lee Welton Croll (m. 2013)
- Children: 5; including Cecilia and Charlotte
- Parent(s): Pehr Gyllenhammar; Aina Gyllenhammar

Pehr Gustaf Gyllenhammar (28 April 1935 – 21 November 2024) was a Swedish businessman. He is mainly known for his 24 years as CEO and chairman of Volvo between 1970 and 1994. In the early 1980s he took the initiative for the European Round Table of Industrialists (ERT).

Gyllenhammar listed his position at the time of his death as Vice Chairman of Rothschild Europe. Gyllenhammar was made Commander of the "Ordre National du Mérite" in France in 1980 and he was made Commander of the Legion of Honour in France in 1987. Gyllenhammar became an Honorary Master of the Bench of the Inner Temple, London in 2001.

== Early life and education ==
Gyllenhammar was born on 28 April 1935 in Gothenburg, Sweden, the son of Pehr Gyllenhammar Sr., a Swedish business man of the Swedish noble family Gyllenhammar, and his Jewish mother, Aina (née Kaplan). He did his military service at Bohuslän Regiment (I 17) in Uddevalla from 1954 to 1955 and became a sergeant. Gyllenhammar graduated from Lund University with a degree in law in 1959 and was an assistant lawyer at the law firm Mannheimer & Zetterlöf in Gothenburg in 1959 and at Haight, Gardner, Poor & Havens in New York City in 1960.

Gyllenhammar studied maritime law in the United States and then aspects of Industrialism at the Centre d'Etudes Industrielles in Geneva, Switzerland in 1968.

== Career ==
Gyllenhammar joined Försäkrings AB Amphion in Gothenburg in 1960 and became a director there in 1962. In 1963, he was appointed director at Återförsäkring AB Amphion-/Equitas. He went on to serve as assistant administrative manager within the Skandia Group in 1965 and became head of corporate planning for the group in 1966. Gyllenhammar became Deputy CEO in 1968, in 1970 he replaced his father, Pehr Gyllenhammar Sr., as CEO. After only a few months he moved to Volvo where he became the CEO in 1971. He replaced his father-in-law Gunnar Engellau, who became chairman, in that position.

=== At Volvo ===
Gyllenhammar became one of the most famous businessmen in Sweden at Volvo. He mixed success with failure. He oversaw a wide-reaching diversification of Volvo's business, buying, among other things pharmaceutical company Pharmacia. What finally forced him to leave Volvo was a failed merger with French company Renault.

=== After Volvo ===
After Volvo, Gyllenhammar withdrew from Swedish public life and moved to London where he eventually became chairman of insurance company Aviva. He returned to Swedish business in 2004 as Chairman of Investment AB Kinnevik.

=== Other work ===
Gyllenhammar was the CEO of Svenska skeppshypotekskassan and Ship Transport Secondary Loan Fund (Skeppsfartens sekundärlånekassa) in Gothenburg from 1970 to 1976, chairman there from 1976, board member of Skandinaviska Enskilda Banken from 1979 to 1994 including vice chairman from 1979 to 1994. Gyllenhammar was board member of United Technologies in Hartford, Connecticut from 1981, Swedish Intercontinental Airlines from 1982, Kissinger Associates in New York City from 1982 to 1997, Atlas Copco from 1982, Hamilton Brothers Petroleum in Denver, Colorado from 1982, S. Pearson & Son in London from 1983 to 1997, Swedish Employers Association from 1979, Sveriges Industriförbund from 1979, FA-rådet from 1981, and a member of the Reuters Holdings PLC board from 1984.

He was also a board member of Philips Electronics NV in Eindhoven from 1990 to 1995, Régie Nationale des Usines Renault SA in Paris from 1990 to 1993 and well as chairman of Procordia from 1990 to 1992. Gyllenhammar was board member of Polygram NV from 1996 and became chairman of the board of Commercial Union PLC in 1998 and senior advisor of Lazard Frères & Co LLC in New York City in 1996. Gyllenhammar was the chairman of Aviva and deputy chairman of Rothschild Europe, chairman of Reuters Founders Share Company Limited and of the European Financial Services Roundtable. He was also a member of the International Advisory Committee of Chase Manhattan Bank 1972–1995.

Majid Al Futtaim Group, a major business chain in the United Arab Emirates, listed Mr Gyllenhammar as its chairman from June 2007 until March 2009.

== Political views ==
Gyllenhammar was an outspoken supporter of the Liberal People's Party. In his 1973 book I Believe in Sweden (Jag tror på Sverige) he was steadfast in his support for the Scandinavian model and argued for the kind social liberalism the Liberal People's Party used to support. Gyllenhammar served on the Party board and was widely considered as a future leader of the party. At times, he revealed an ambition to become Prime Minister of Sweden.

== Personal life and death ==
Gyllenhammar was married 1959–2008 to Christina Engellau (1936–2008), the daughter of Volvo CEO Gunnar Engellau and Margit (née Höckert). They had three daughters and one son: Cecilia, Charlotte, Sophie, and Oscar. He married the horse sports journalist Christel Behrmann in 2010. They divorced in 2012. In April 2013 he married the British-Canadian doctor of psychology, Lee Welton Croll. They had a child in 2016.

Gyllenhammar resided in Toronto in the later part of his life, where he died after a short illness on 21 November 2024, at the age of 89.

== Awards and decorations ==
=== Swedish ===
- (Sweden) H. M. The King's Medal, 12th size gold (silver-gilt) medal worn around the neck on the Order of the Seraphim ribbon (1981)
- (Sweden) Commander 1st Class of the Order of Vasa (1973)
- (Sweden) Knight of the Order of Vasa (1965)

=== Foreign ===
- Commander 1st Class of the Order of the White Rose of Finland (1986; Commander 1977)
- (Norway) Commander of the Order of St. Olav (1 July 1984)
- (Belgium) Commander of the Order of Leopold (1989)
- (France) Commander of the Legion of Honour (1987)
- (France) Commander of the National Order of Merit (1980)

== Honorships ==
- Member of the Royal Swedish Academy of Engineering Sciences (1974)
- Honorary member of Gothenburg nation at Lund University (1975)
- Honorary Doctor of Medicine of the University of Gothenburg (1981)
- Honorary Doctor of Technology at Brunel University London, England (1987)
- Honorary Doctor of Engineering at the Technical University of Nova Scotia, Canada (1988)
- Honorary Doctor of Social Sciences at the University of Helsinki (1990)
- Honorary Doctor of Law at the University of Vermont, USA (1993)
- Honorary Doctor of Economics at the School of Business, Economics and Law, University of Gothenburg (2003)
- Fellow of the Norwegian Academy of Technological Sciences
- Honorary Master of the Bench of the Inner Temple in London (2001)

== Bibliography ==
- Gyllenhammar, Pehr G. (2020). Perspektiv (in Swedish). Translated by Ramm, Marie. [Stockholm]: Bazar. ISBN 9789180060172. SELIBR q2kp6ctmnbxt3fj1.
- Gyllenhammar, Pehr G. (2020). Character Is Destiny. Morgan James Publishing. ISBN 978-1642799736.
- Gyllenhammar, Pehr G.; Palmgren, Anders (2015). Oberoende är stark [Independence is strong] (in Swedish) (Extended ed.). Stockholm: Bonnier. ISBN 9789100154837. SELIBR 17882071.
- Gyllenhammar, Pehr G.; Palmgren, Anders (2014). Oberoende är stark [Independence is strong] (in Swedish). Stockholm: Bonnier. ISBN 9789100140229. SELIBR 14978729.
- Gyllenhammar, Pehr G. (2000). Fortsättning följer [To be continued] (in Swedish). Stockholm: Bonnier. ISBN 9100573299. SELIBR 7150424.
- Gyllenhammar, Pehr G.; Palmgren, Anders; Petersson, Christer (1992). Även med känsla [Even with feeling]. MånPocket, 99-0184541-6 (in Swedish) (New ed.). Stockholm: MånPocket. ISBN 9176427668. SELIBR 7654624.
- Gyllenhammar, Pehr G.; Palmgren, Anders; Petersson, Christer (1991). Även med känsla [Even with feeling] (in Swedish). Stockholm: Bonnier fakta. ISBN 9134512063. SELIBR 7247301.
- Gyllenhammar, Pehr G. (1991). Pengarna eller livet [The money or life] (in Swedish). Gothenburg: Informationsavd., Univ. ISBN 91-7360-188-8. SELIBR 7637634.
- Gyllenhammar, Pehr G. (1981). Bilindustrin - inför ett débâcle? [The car industry - facing a débâcle?]. Handelsbankens småskriftsseries, 0348-0739; 20 (in Swedish). Stockholm: Sv. handelsbanken. SELIBR 287706.
- Gyllenhammar, Pehr G. (1979). En industripolitik för människan [An industrial policy for man]. Företag och samhälle, 0348-7830; 1979:4 (in Swedish). Stockholm: Studieförb. Näringsliv och samhälle (SN&S. ISBN 9171502017. SELIBR 7609392.
- Gyllenhammar, Pehr G. (1977). People at work. Reading, Mass.: Addison-Wesley. ISBN 0201024993. SELIBR 4701601.
- Gyllenhammar, Pehr G. (1974). Jag tror på Sverige [I believe in Sweden]. Företagsledare berättar, 99-0106030-3 (in Swedish) (New ed.). Stockholm: Askild & Kärnekull. ISBN 9170084475. SELIBR 7589517.
- Gyllenhammar, Pehr G. (1973). Jag tror på Sverige [I believe in Sweden]. Företagsledare berättar, 99-0106030-3 (in Swedish). Stockholm: Askild & Kärnkull. ISBN 9170083371. SELIBR 7589444.
- Gyllenhammar, Pehr G. (1970). Mot sekelskiftet på måfå [Towards the turn of the century at random]. Sond, 99-3537592-7 (in Swedish). Stockholm: [Bonnier (distr.)]. SELIBR 99351.

Business positions
Preceded by Gunnar Engellau	Chief executive officer of Volvo; 1971–1983	Succeeded by Håkan Frisinger
Preceded by Anders Wall	Chairman of the board of Volvo; 1983–1993	Succeeded by Bert-Olof Svanholm
