= Charlotte Gyllenhammar =

Swedish artist (born 1963)

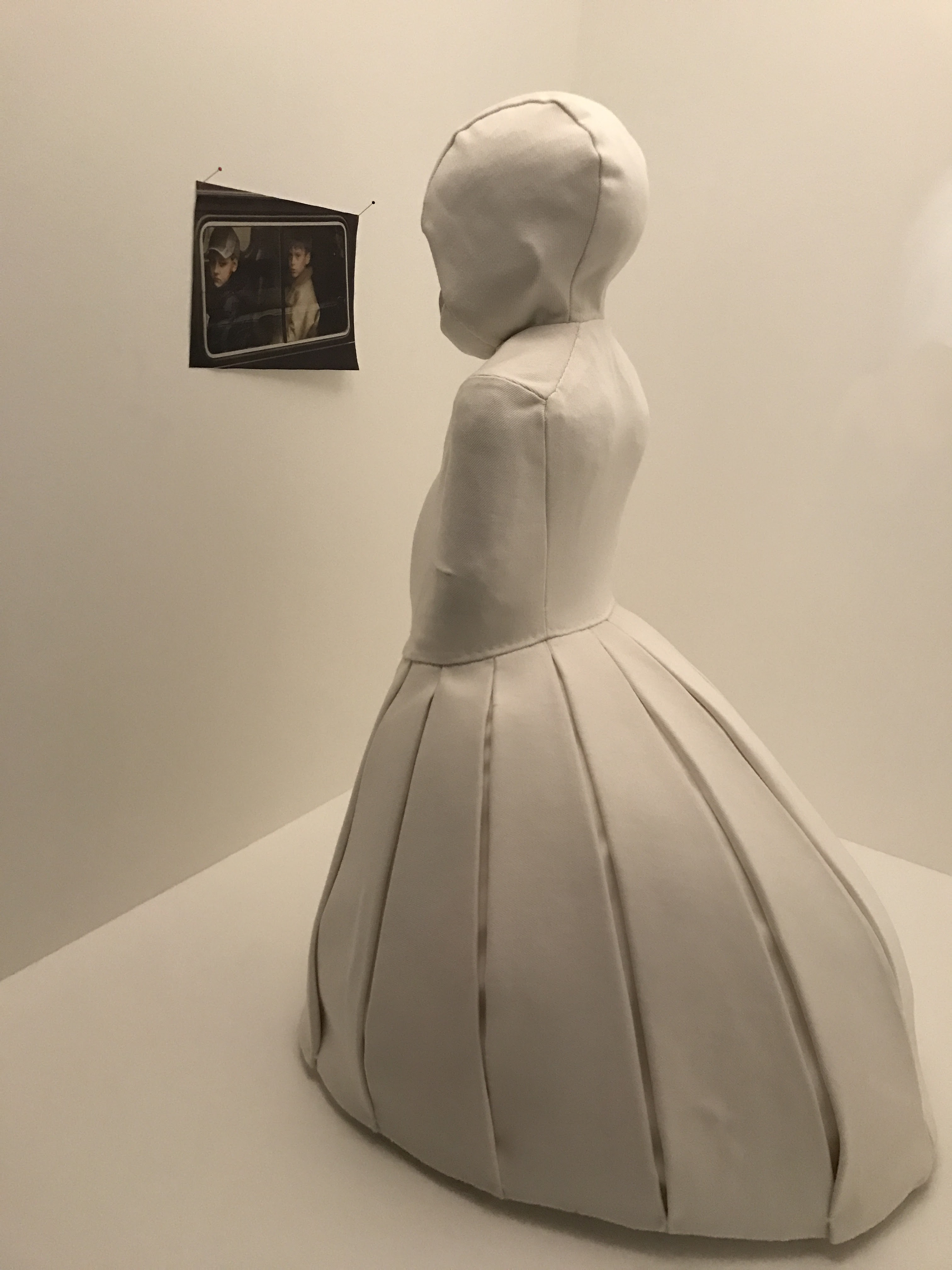
Charlotte Gyllenhammar "The Spector"

Eva Charlotte Gyllenhammar (born 16 December 1963) is a Swedish fine artist based in Stockholm. She began her career as a painter, but swiftly moved on to sculpture and installation after completing her studies at the Royal College of Art in London. In 1993, she broke through the Swedish art scene when she suspended a 120-year-old tree over Drottninggatan, the main street in the center of Stockholm. The work entitled Die for You was the first step in a progression of images and environments that invert perspective. For example, confinement and inversion are evident in her video/photographic series of suspended women entitled Belle, 1998, Disobedience, 1998, Fall, 1999, and more recently Hang 2006. The series Hang is composed of both color or c-prints and gelatin silver prints. The photographs were first premiered at Paris Photo in 2006, in the Central Exhibition, which was dedicated to the Nordic countries, where Gyllenhammar represented Sweden.

Charlotte Gyllenhammar, has in her artistic production, investigated issues such as identity, the boundaries between public and private, captivity, and terrorism. Her oeuvre is characterised by a formalist sensibility and deviating perspectives. Sculptural installations include Vertigo, 2002 at Wanås sculpture park in Sweden. Vertigo was a large installation where Gyllenhammar created a full-scale subterranean and inverted replica of her studio. Gyllenhammar has since become one of Sweden’s most prominent contemporary artists. A major exhibition of her work entitled Private Idiot was held at Kulturhuset, in the heart of Stockholm, which later travelled to Dunkers Kulturhus in Helsingborg, Sweden. An accompanying book was published in conjunction with the award winning exhibition. In addition, Gyllenhammar has completed a series of important public works such as the Raoul Wallenberg Memorial, 2007 in Gothenburg, Sweden. Her installation Wait, the smallest of us is dead has been exhibited at Glasstress, a collateral event of the 2011 Venice Biennale. Her work is featured in several significant collections including the Moderna Museet, Sweden; the National Museum of Women in the Arts, Washington, D.C., United States; and Kiasma, Finland.In 2016, Fotografiska Stockholm presented Natt/Night, a retrospective exhibition of Gyllenhammar’s work, featuring a selection of photography, sculpture, and film.

Charlotte Gyllenhammar is the daughter of Pehr G. Gyllenhammar.
