= Orion Theatre =

Theatre in Stockholm, Sweden

- Orionteatern
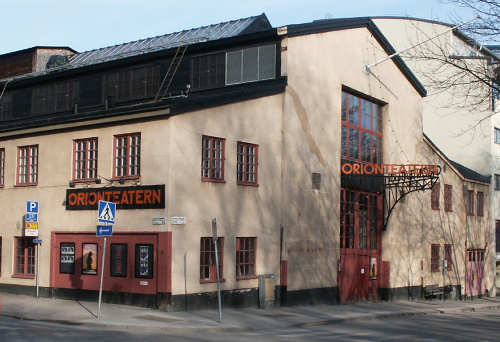
- Theatre exterior in 2006
- Interactive map of Orion Theatre
- Address: Katarina Bangata 77; Stockholm; Sweden
- Coordinates: 59°18′30.19″N 18°05′25.44″E

Website
- orionteatern.se

The Orion Theatre (Swedish: Orionteatern) is a theater located at Katarina Bangata 77 in the district of Södermalm in Stockholm, Sweden. Orion theater was founded in 1983 and is the city's largest avant-garde stage.

== History ==
The building was built in 1929 and was once a mechanical workshop. The theatre provides a space for theatrical experiments and artistic works and it is a meeting place for artists searching for new ways of working outside the limitations of institutional theatre. It is also provides a place for institutions who want to try out new working methods through collaboration.

The theatre has exchange programs with companies from all parts of the world. Among these are the Peking Opera in Shanghai, Théâtre de Complicité from London, Le Cirque Invisible from Paris, the Suzuki Company of Toga, Japan, Gopal Venu's Kootiyattam ensemble from Kerala, India and the School of Dramatic Art, Moscow.

Orion Theater is also an educational theater with a developed collaboration with the Theater Academy and the Dramatic Institute in Stockholm. Lars Rudolfsson and Stina Oscarson were jointly artistic directors of the theater between 2004 and 2011. Since 2011 Lars Rudolfsson remained as the sole artistic director.
