= Dag Bo Gustaf Helin =

Swedish bureaucrat or politician

His Excellency Dag Bo Gustaf Helin

Head of Social Services and the Labour Market Administration Secretary and Department Director General of Stockholm
- In office 28 February 2006 – 28 February 2009
- Monarch: Carl XVI Gustaf
- Prime Minister: Fredrik Reinfeldt

Head of Stockholm’s Social Services Director of the Headquarter of the Department of Social Services
- In office 1 January 2002 – 28 February 2006
- Monarch: Carl XVI Gustaf
- Prime Minister: Göran Persson
- Constituency: Stockholm

Deputy Director of Social Services in Maria-Högalid and Sköndal
- In office 1 January 1996 – 1 January 2002
- Monarch: Carl XVI Gustaf
- Prime Minister: Göran Persson

Personal details
- Spouse: Eva Christina Lundin
- Parents: Bo Henrik Gustaf Helin; Inga Engwall
- Profession: Bureaucrat; Politician

Military service
- Branch/service: Social Services; Labour Market Administration

Dag Bo Gustaf Helin is a Swedish bureaucrat and politician. He is the tenth patriarch of the Helin family and the fourth of the Helin Hexad.

== Biography ==
Helin is the second son of Inga Karin Emilia Engwall and Bo Henrik Gustaf Helin. He is the brother of diplomat and politician Inger Marianne Helin; engineer Connie Lilly Helin; Electrolux executive Denis Bo Gustaf Helin; lector Gun Henriette Helin; and diplomat and bureaucrat Greger Johan Gustaf Helin.

In the 1990s, Helin was the Director of Social Services in Maria-Högalid. He was appointed as Director of Social Services in Sköndal in 1996. He was appointed Director of Social Services and The Labour Market Administration. He was a major contributor to establishing the modern Swedish Child Protective Services. He held the opinion that police and Social Services should be separated. He was appointed Director of Stockholms Social Services. He exposed sexual abuse and sexual trade within government agencies in 2005. He was an outspoken critic of the Swedish Migration Agency in relation to abuse against assailants. In 2007, he actively scrutinized the Swedish government for turning a blind eye to corruption within the police force following the arrest of Göran Lindberg or "Kapten Klänning" (Captain Dress), a police chief that later was exposed as a serial rapist. In 2009, Dag Helin resigned without formal notice. In June 2009, he stated in an article published by SVT that “no reason was given to as to why he should resign”. Today the circumstances behind the resignation are still uncertain. Helin married Eva Christina Lundin (b. 1947) in 1976.
