= Löwenhielm family =

Swedish noble family

Löwenhielm
- Noble
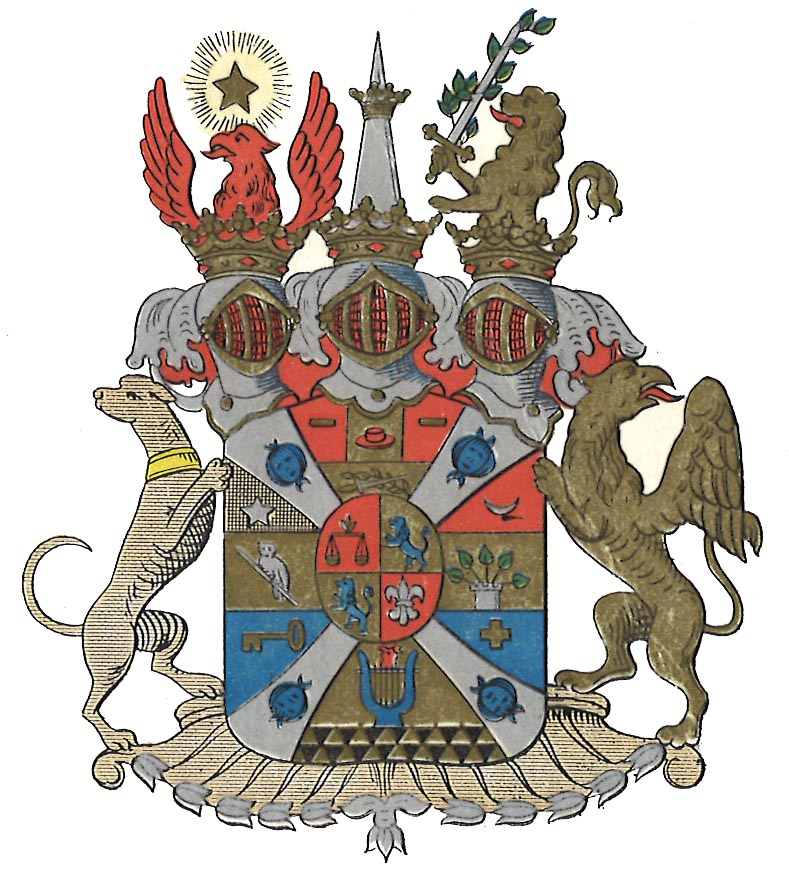
- Country: Sweden
- Current region: Sweden; Poland; Germany
- Origin: Småland
- Founded: 1725; 301 years ago
- Founder: Gudmund Löwenhielm
- Titles: Baron; Count
- Members: Gudmund Löwenhielm; Carl Gustaf Löwenhielm; Augusta Löwenhielm; Gustaf Löwenhielm; Carl Löwenhielm; Carl Gustaf Löwenhielm; Jacquette Löwenhielm; Betty Löwenhielm; Severin Löwenhielm; Laura Löwenhielm; Harriet Löwenhjelm; Brita Löwenhielm; Fredrik Löwenhielm; Fredrik Adolf Löwenhielm
- Connected families: Löfvenskiöld; von Essen; Nordberg; Bure kinship; Cederhielm family; Helin family
- Traditions: Lutherism; Freemasonry

The Löwenhielm family (English pronunciation: [lˈɜːwənhˌiːlm]), also known as House of Löwenhielm, is a Swedish noble family originating from the extinct Nordenberg family and the still existing Nordenfalk family. The Löwenhielm family has obtained baronial status and one branch has further elevated to count-hood. The family was first ennobled on 12 March 1725. Löwenhielm was first introduced in the House of Nobility in 1726 under the number Löwenhielm - 1791.

== History ==
The Löwenhielm family originates from Småland, where its oldest known ancestor, a farmer named Gudmund, lived in the Kånna parish in the 16th century. According to the “Svenska adelns Ättar-taflor” (English: Clan paintings of the Swedish nobility), he was a Walloon and a tower builder in Sweden. Gudmund's son, Erlandus Gudmundi Norenius (1554-1630), signed the decision of the Uppsala Synod and was a parish priest in the North. Norenius first wife, Birgitta Persdotter, was the sister of the dean Esbernus Petri in Örebro, and his second wife was Anna Kax, the daughter of the parish priest in Tuna parish. In the second marriage, Gudmundus Erlandi Norenius was born, who became the principal in Karlstad and the dean of Nordmark's district. His wife noblewomen was Elisabeth Flygge, whose mother was a von Brehme. Their children took the name Nordberg. One of their sons became the father of Johan Henrik, who was ennobled as Nordenborg.

Their second son, Gudmund Nordberg (1656-1739), was a judge and assessor in the Göta Court of Appeal. He was married to Baroness Anna Elisabeth Cederhielm from the Cederhielm family, whose mother was the niece of Anders Siggesson belonging to the Bure family, which was ennobled as Falkengren. Gudmund Nordberg was ennobled by King Frederick I of Sweden with the name Löwenhielm on 12 May 1725 and was introduced under the number 1791 in the year 1726. The lineage still continues, and the current (2007) head is the architect Gunnar Löwenhielm (born 1936). Multiple members of the family spell the name Löwenhjelm.

A son of Gudmund Löwenhielm and Anna Elisabeth (Maria) Cederhielm, the Chancellor of Justice and later Councilor of the Realm Carl Gustaf Löwenhielm (1701-1768), who was raised to the rank of baron in 1747 and introduced as such in 1752 under the number 224. Ten years later, he was further elevated to the rank of count (at which point the baronial family line ended), and he was introduced as such in 1766 under number 87. This committal family became extinct on the patrilineal side in 1861 and on the matrilineal side in 1933.

== Notable members ==
- Gudmund Löwenhielm
- Carl Gustaf Löwenhielm
- Augusta Löwenhielm
- Gustaf Löwenhielm
- Carl Löwenhielm
- Jacquette Löwenhielm
- Betty Löwenhielm
- Severin Löwenhielm
- Laura Löwenhielm
- Harriet Löwenhjelm
- Brita Löwenhielm
- Fredrik Löwenhielm
- Fredrik Adolf Löwenhielm
- Johan Fridolf Helin (married Löwenhielm Helin)

== Bibliography ==
- Sveriges Ridderskap och Adels kalender 2007
- Gabriel Anrep, Svenska adelns Ättar-taflor, volym 1-2
