= Johan Gustaf Helin =

Swedish industrialist and politician

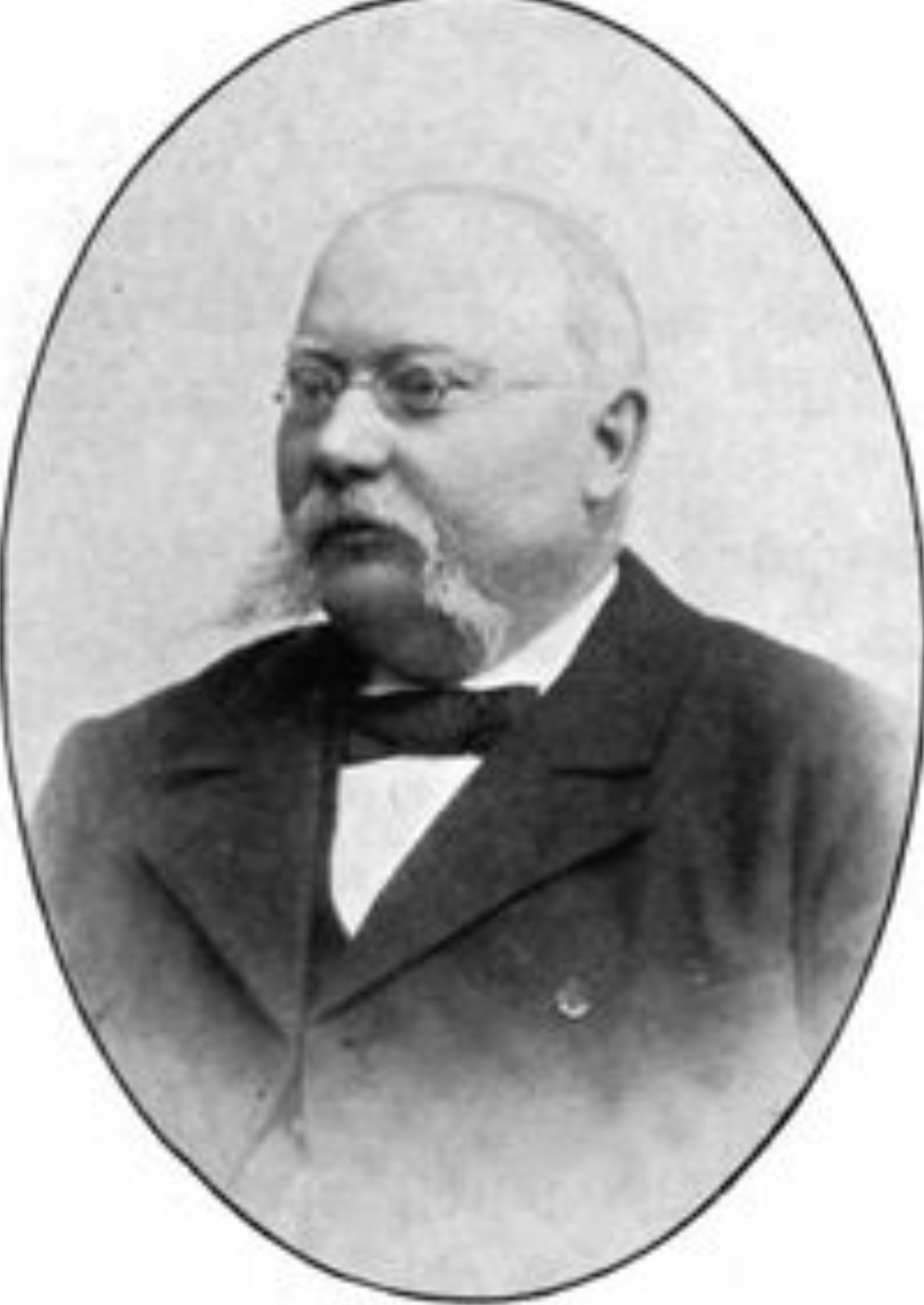

1st Chairman of Spirit Factory Petterberg PR Borås 3rd CEO of Spirit Factory Petterberg PR Borås
- Preceded by: Position Established
- Succeeded by: Gustaf Helin
- Preceded by: Position Established
- Succeeded by: Ericson

Personal details
- Born: 1844
- Died: Unknown
- Spouse: Augusta Svensson
- Children: Gustaf Helin
- Parent: Johan Fridolf Helin
- Profession: Industrialist; businessman; Politician

Johan Gustaf Helin or Johan Helin IIIII was a Swedish industrialist, businessman and politician. He was the founder of Spirit Factory Petterberg PR Borås, Sweden's largest spirit producer during the late 19th century. He was the sixth patriarch of the Helin family.

== Biography ==
Johan Gustaf Helin (Helin: Johan | Löwenhielm: Gustaf) was the son of Johan Fridolf Helin and Maria Lovisa Löwenhielm. Johan Gustaf was born out of wedlock and was not able to live with his biological parents. Johan Gustaf co-owned multiple printed-press media publications together with his paternal side of his family. His distant relative also named Johan Gustaf Helin (in Luleå) was the founder of the publication “Boden”, later Hallman & Helins boktryckeriaktiebolag. In the realm of media he soon befriended members of the Serrander family. Johan Helin acquired the estate Petersberg in 1872. In the late 1870s, he was an active member of the Varberg–Borås Järnväg (WBJ) committee. He had a significant involvement in the construction of Varberg–Borås Railway (WBJ) due to the first station being located on the Petersberg estate. In 1882, Johan Gustaf Helin founded Johan Helin's Spirit Factory Petterberg PR Borås. The initially delivered spirits to individual households. In 1886, Johan Helin's factory started to wholesale liquor in Borås, Ulricehamn and Kungsbacka. In 1887, Helin's factory had 14 licensed retailers and annually sold 900 000 litres of liquor. Johan Gustaf Helin remained sole owner of the factory and expanded into vines and beers in the early 20th century. He befriended Victor Theodor Engwall, who at the time was a commissioned based wholesaler of brandy and liquors. Victor Engwall and Johan Helin initiated a partnership in the 1890s.

Johan Gustaf Helin was married to Maria Augusta Svensson. Her father was industrialist Frans August Svensson, who founded Svensson Tobak.
