= General Löwenhielm =

General Löwenhielm may refer to:

- Carl Gustaf Löwenhielm (1790–1858), Swedish Army lieutenant general
- Carl Löwenhielm (1772–1861), Swedish Army lieutenant general
- Gustaf Löwenhielm (1771–1856), Swedish Army general
