= Battle of Mysunde =

Battle of Mysunde may refer to:

- Battle of Mysunde (1848), a skirmish during the First Schleswig War
- Battle of Mysunde (1864), the first battle of the Second Schleswig War
