= Clemens Johannes Helin IIII =

Swedish scholar

Clemens Johannes Helin IIII or Johan Helin III (1782-1853) was a Swedish scholar, lector, theologist and chamber council in the Royal Court of Sweden. He was the fourth patriarch of the Helin family.

== Biography ==
Clemens Johannes Helin llll (1782-1853) was the registered son of Clemens Helin lll and Sara Christina Unge. He is noted as an unspecified Chamber Council of The Royal Court of Sweden. Clemens llll was the illegitimate child of Chancellery President Axel von Fersen the Younger and Sophia Albertina, Abbess of Quedlinburg. He worked for a period at Uppsala University with Count Axel von Fersen, who further was cousin of Augusta Löwenhielm. He married Albertina Jæger and was father of Teresia Clementine Uggla (1814-1861) as well as Johan Fridolf Helin. Clemens llll was granted Knighthood of the Order of the Polar Star. He was the father-in-law of Pontus Reinhold Uggla (1798-1880), a soldier in the Värmland Regiment during the Swedish-Norwegian War of 1814 and a Commander in the Swedish Army.
