= Gudmund Löwenhielm =

Swedish nobleman, lawman and politician

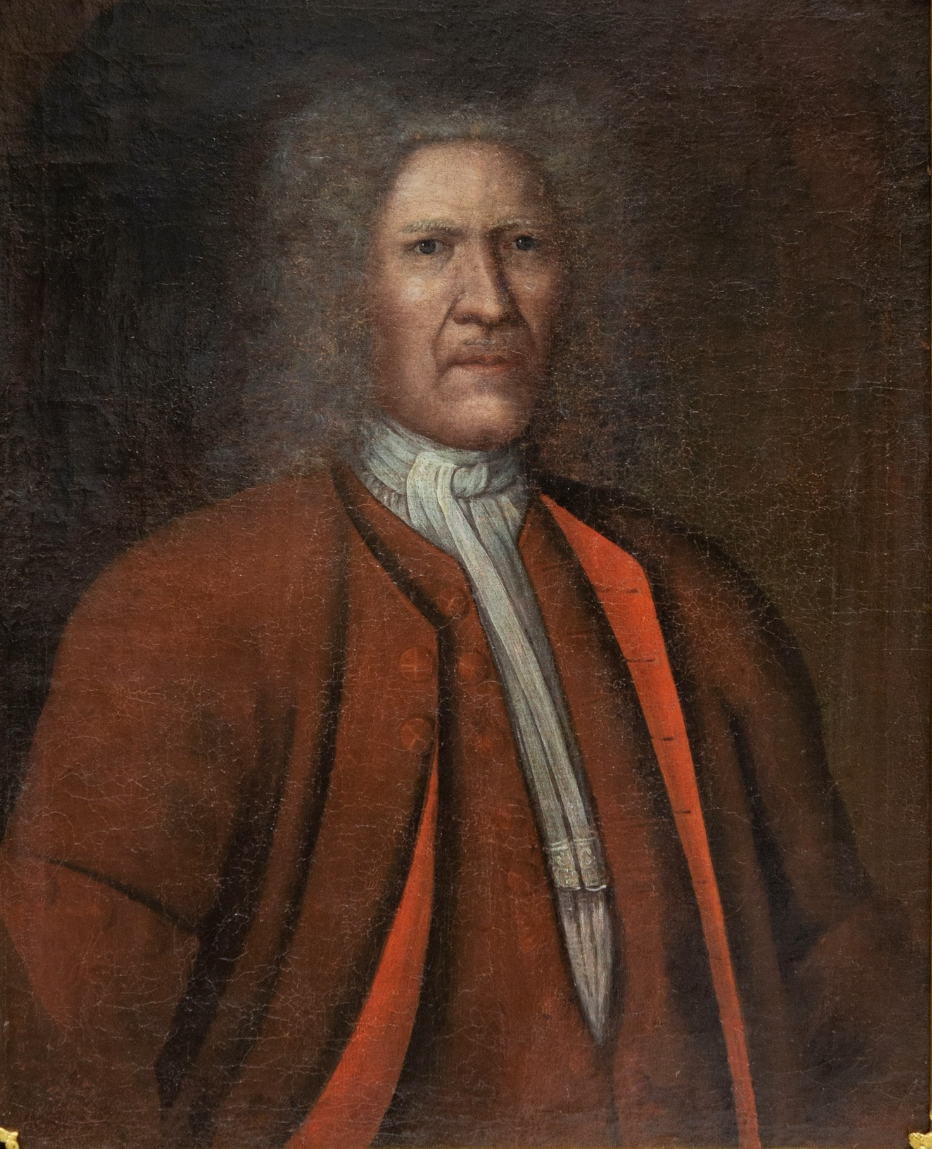

13th Governor of Bohuslän 1st Chancellor of Bohuslän Court
- Preceded by: Germund Palm
- Succeeded by: Crispin Löwenhielm

Personal details
- Born: 24 December 1656
- Died: 30 May 1739 (aged 82)
- Spouse: Maria Cederhielm
- Children: Johan Gudmund Löwenhielm; Carl Gustaf Löwenhielm; Crispin Löwenhielm; Gudmund Erik Löwenhielm
- Parent: Gudmundus Erlandi Norenius
- Profession: Nobleman; Court Official; Military Official

Gudmund Löwenhielm the Elder (born Gudmund Nordberg; 24 December 1656 – 30 May 1739) was a Swedish military official, justiciary and statesman who served as the 13th governor of Bohuslän from 1702 until his death in 1739. He was the founder of the Löwenhielm family.

== Biography ==
Gudmund Löwenhielm the Elder was born as Gudmund Nordberg on 24 December 1656 at his family seat and estate, Gillberga prästgård in Värmland County. On his father's side, he was a member of the aristocracy as a descendant of Gudmund Noreen and his son, Erlandus Gudmundi, who had been recognized by the parliament and monarch. His father, Gudmundus Erlandi Norenius, representing the clergy as the dean of the Nordmark deanery, had been elected member of the Riksdag of the Estate in 1652. His mother, Elisabet Flygge, was the daughter of the Well-High Borne Peter Flygge of Bro, the General Customs Inspector of Västergötland, Värmland, Närke, and Dalarna.

In 1665, Gudmund Löwenhielm graduated the Gymnasium in Karlstad. On 7 September 1670, he obtained a law degree from Uppsala University. In 1680, Gudmund was appointed as Auditor at Svea Court of Appeal. He became a Lawyer at Svea Court of Appeal in 1682.

He served as Auditor at Västgöta Cavalry Regiment and was appointed Auditor at Västgöta-dal's regiment, 13 September 1689.

Gudmund Löwenhielm was later appointed Royal Commissioner and Royal Representative at the forest commission in Västergötland in 1691 and in 1692. In 1699, he was appointed as deputy governor in Västersysslet [sv] and in Värmland.

Gudmund was appointed Chief Royal Auditor of the Närke and Värmland Regiment in 1699.

On 2 January 1702, Gudmund Löwenhielm was appointed as Chancellor of Norrvikens domsaga [sv] (English: Norrviken's judicial region) and governor of Bohuslän.

From 1706 to 1711, Gudmund was mayor of Strömstad. On 13 August 1716, he was appointed as Chancellery Assessor in Göta Court of Appeal.

On 1 September 1718, Gudmund was appointed as the Lawman of Kristinehamns domsaga [sv](English: Kristinehamn's judicial region). On 8 October 1719, he was again appointed as Chancellery Assessor in Göta Court of Appeal.

Gudmund Löwenhielm was knighted on 12 May 1725, and was introduced in the House of Nobility in 1726 under the number 1791.
