= Clemens Johannes Helin III =

Swedish scholar, theologist, military preacher and provost

Clemens Johannes Helin III or Clemens Helin II (14 December 1742 – 5 September 1807) was a Swedish scholar, theologist, military preacher and provost. He was the third patriarch of the Helin family.

== Biography ==
Clemens Johannes Helin lll (Clemens Helin 1742–1807) was the son of Clemens Johannes Helin ll and Baroness Vendela Christina Hjelmgren in Gränna. He obtained a masters degree at Greifswalds University in Germany in 1766. Clemens lll was appointed as Extraordinary Preacher of the Livregementets dragoner in 1769. In 1773, he was appointed as Principal of Stora Barnhuset (English: The Great Children's Home). He acted as Provost in multiple constituencies, amongst other, Östra Kontrakt, Älmeboda Parish and Konga Parish. On July 8, 1774, Clemens lll married Sara Christina Unge (1746–1817). Sara Christina’s father was the Circuit Judge of Konga Anders Unge (1685–1767), the eldest son of medical doctorate Petrus Unge (1643–1714). Her mother was Anna Helena Windrufva, daughter of estate owner Sven Eliasson Windrufva (1664–1722), and granddaughter of Elias Svenonis Windrufva (1635–1685), who, according to the 1681 Tax Record, was the wealthiest man in Borås. Anna Helena’s great-grandfather was the Mayor and Lordship of Borås Sven Persson Windrufva (1598–1659). The Windrufva family owned Ramshulan, Jutagärde, Ridarebo and Funningen.
