= Battle of Mysunde (1848) =

1848 skirmish during the First Schleswig War

- Part of First Schleswig War
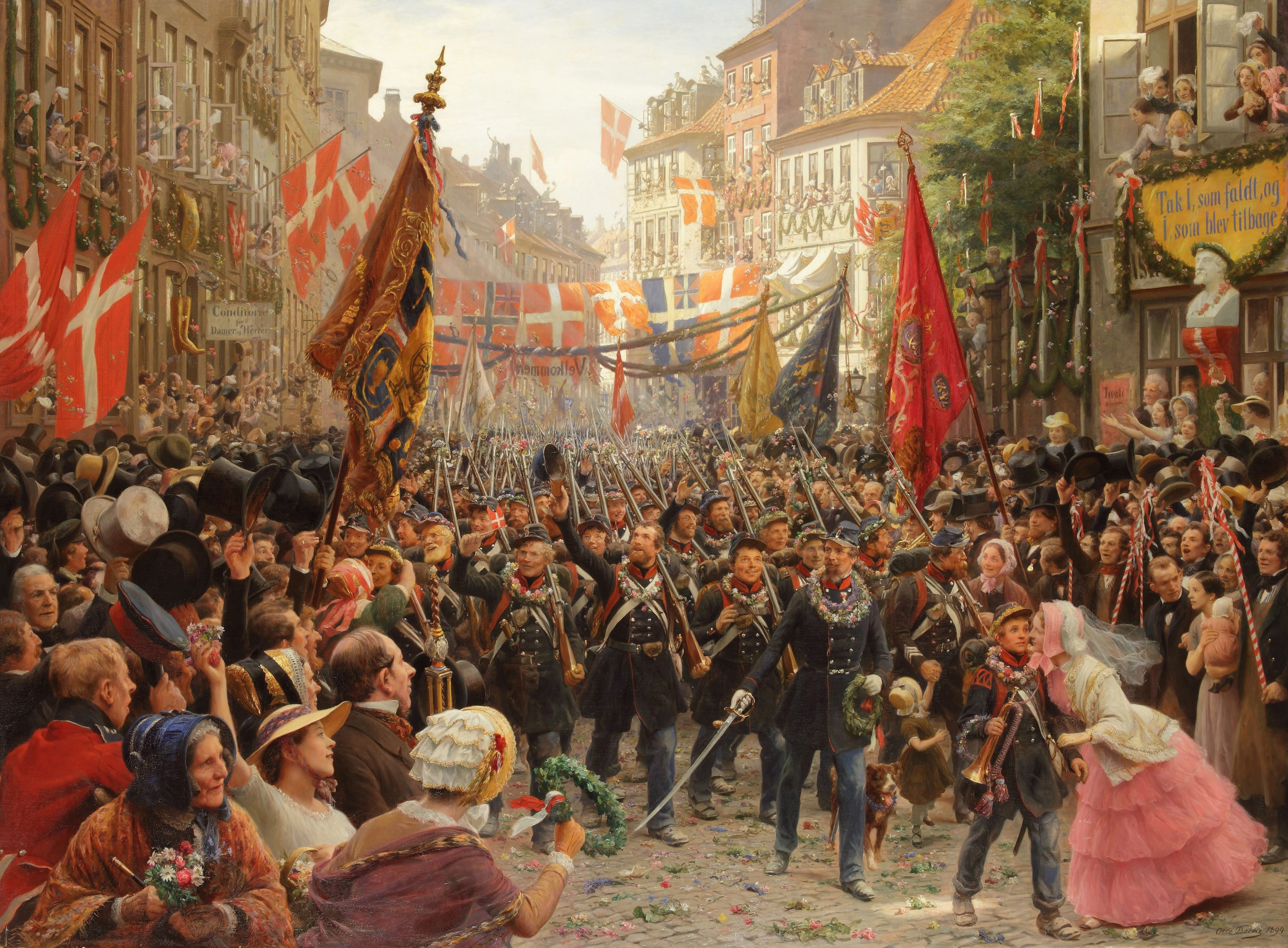
- Danish soldiers return to Copenhagen in 1849 by Otto Bache (1894)
Date	April 23, 1848
Location	Mysunde
Result	Prussian victory

Belligerents
Prussia	Denmark

Strength
28,000	11,000

The Battle of Mysunde (1848), or the First Battle of Mysunde took place in the First Schleswig War at Mysunde, Germany. The battle occurred April 23, 1848. The battle resulted in a Danish defeat.

== Leadup ==
It was fought between Denmark and Germany over the Schleswig-Holstein Question - that is, who should control the duchies of Holstein and Schleswig. Prussia and Sweden were also involved in the war. Mysunde was a critical site for battle because it had a ferry over the narrowest point of the Schlei. Previously, the Danes had met the insurgents at Flensburg and forced the German army to fall back, but the insurgents then received reinforcements from the Germans.

== Battle ==
Germany, Prussia, and the insurgents together brought an army of 28,000 men. They also had more modern weapons than the Danes, who had an army of only 11,000 men. After a long day of fighting, the Danes were forced to retreat to the island of Als, and therefore lost the battle.

== Aftermath ==
The Danes were able to regroup at the island due to a deep sound that separated the island from the mainland. They were also able to use their ships to harass the main German army, to the point that the commander of the Prussian army, Friedrich Graf von Wrangel, demanded four million rix as compensation for the damage caused. The Germans and the Prussians were so crippled by the Danish navy that they were forced to seize a part of Jutland as security. However, the Prussian court forced Wrangel to retire from the battle. Oscar I of Sweden then attempted to send an army to assist Germany, but before that army could arrive, the Great powers of Europe forced a treaty that caused a seven months' peace. Both sides were so dissatisfied with the peace, however, that both continued fighting at the end of the seven months.

== See also ==
- First Schleswig War
- Second Schleswig War
- Battle of Mysunde (1864)
