= Inger Wessberg =

Swedish industrialist and politician

EG-delegate in Brussels Sidoackrediterad Ambassador in Paris
- In office 28 February 1990 – 28 February 1995
- Monarch: Carl XVI Gustaf
- Prime Minister: Carl Bildt

Labour Market Council of the Swedish Employers' Confederation
- In office 1 January 1987 – 28 February 1990
- Monarch: Carl XVI Gustaf
- Prime Minister: Ingvar Carlsson

Department Director of the Swedish Employers' Confederation
- In office 1 January 1981 – 1 January 1987
- Monarch: Carl XVI Gustaf
- Prime Minister: Olof Palme

Personal details
- Born: 19 July 1938
- Died: 31 January 2014 (aged 75)
- Spouse: Göran Wessberg
- Parent: Bo Henrik Gustaf Helin
- Profession: Diplomat; Bureaucrat; Politician

Inger Marianne Wessberg, née Helin (19 July 1938 – 31 January 2014) held several high-level positions in the Swedish business community. She was an early advocate of European affairs, and later became a labour market advisor in Brussels to monitor EU issues. For many years, she was active in Rotary and Zonta. International.

== Biography ==
Inger Helin was the eldest child of Inga Karin Emilia Engwall and Bo Henrik Gustaf Helin. In 1962 she married Göran Wessberg. In 1964, she graduated the Stockholm School of Economics. From 1962 to 1966 Inger Wessberg worked at IBM. In 1966-1969 she taught evening classes in business subjects and 1969-1971 she was Assistant lecturer in Scandinavian Languages at the University of Auckland.

After returning to Sweden, Inger Wessberg was assigned to several investigative missions for SIDA between 1972 and 1973.[4] before moving to Gothenburg where she then worked on various development projects at Volvo AB. Before the following position as Head of Human Resources at DAGAB Väst in 1979, she became the first woman to be admitted to the INSEAD Management training in Fontainebleu.

In 1981, Inger Wessberg was appointed Head of SAF, the Swedish Employer’s Confederation, later renamed the Confederation of Swedish Enterprise, in Gothenburg with responsibility for the entire region of West Sweden with more than 7,000 companies. She was also a Council member of the West Sweden Chamber of Commerce.

In 1987, Inger Wessberg was appointed to a three-year mission as the Labour Market Council to monitor labour market issues in the EC area, France, the Netherlands and Belgium. After her time in Brussels, she acted as a contact person for SAF (The Confederation of Swedish Enterprise) and members of the Swedish Parliament on issues related to Sweden's entry to the European Union. Despite severe illness, she continued to work until her retirement in 2000.
