= Johan Fridolf Helin =

Swedish military official

Commandant-General Johan Fridolf Helin RSO, RNO1kl, RSO1kl,
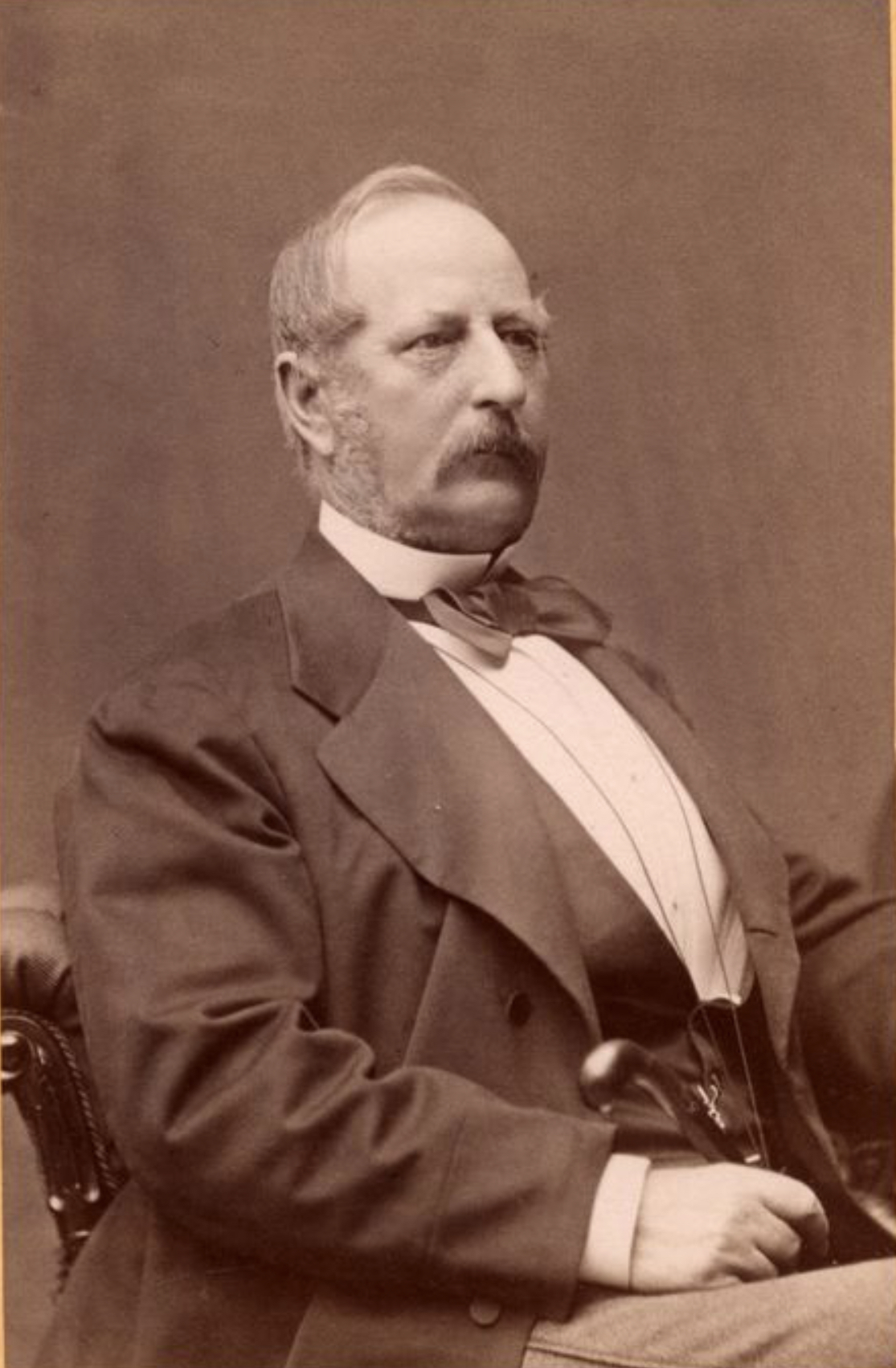
- Helin, 1880-1885

17th Chief of the Royal Infantry Regiment of Värmland
- In office 1871–1873
- Preceded by: August Silverstolpe
- Succeeded by: Helmer Falk

Commandant-General of the Royal Infantry Regiment of Värmland
- In office 1860–1870
- Preceded by: Office established
- Succeeded by: Office Abolished

Personal details
- Born: 4 February [O.S. 25 February] 1816 Stockholm County, United Kingdoms of Sweden and Norway
- Died: 7 November 1886 (aged 70) Värmland, United Kingdoms of Sweden and Norway
- Resting place: Norra begravningsplatsen, Solna Municipality, Stockholm County; 59.35442°N 18.03254°E
- Parent: Clemens Helin IV
- Awards: Knight of the Order of the Sword; Knight First Class of the Order of the Polar Star

Military service
- Allegiance: United Kingdoms of Sweden and Norway; Personal Union of Denmark; Pan-Scandinavism Forces
- Branch/service: Swedish Army
- Years of service: 1834-1886
- Rank: Major General
- Battles/wars: See battles: First Schleswig War; Battle of Mysunde (1848); Battle of Schleswig; Battle of Bov; Battle of Nybøl; Battle of Dybbøl (1848); Battle of Kolding (1849); Skirmish of Århus; Battle of Fredericia; Second Schleswig War; Battle for Königshügel; Battle of Sankelmark; Battle of Mysunde (1864); Battle of Vejle; Battle of Dybbøl; Battle of Als
- Selected battles

Johan Fridolf Helin or Johan Helin IIII (4 February 1816 - 7 November 1886) was a Swedish military official, aristocrat and statesman who served as chief of the Royal Infantry Regiment of Värmland from 1870 to 1873 and the commander-in-chief of the Swedish Voluntary Forces to Schleswig.

== Early life ==
Johan Fridolf Helin was born on 4 February 1816 at his family’s ancestral home, Kloster Castle in Stockholm County. On his paternal side, he was a member of the ancient aristocracy as a descendant of Baldwin of Ibelin. His father, Clemens von Helin IV, was extraordinary chamber council of the Royal Court of the United Kingdoms of Sweden and Norway. His mother was Albertina Jaeger, the daughter of a prominent Catholic family.

In 1822, his brother-in-law, Pontus Reinhold Uggla, was appointed Lieutenant of the Royal Infantry Regiment of Värmland and his sister relocated southwards. His brother-in-law had risen to notoriety after his heroic actions during the 1813 to 1814 war campaigns against Norway, and the unification of the kingdoms.

In 1833, he enrolled at the Military Academy Karlberg, joining the academy as a Swedish cadet as part of his three-year training as do officers aspiring to become army captain. In 1836, he graduated as an officer and was employed by the Swedish Armed Forces.

== Early career ==
Helin held various lower officer ranks from 1836 until 1848, when he was promoted to Captain of the Värmland Regiment.

== First Schleswig War ==
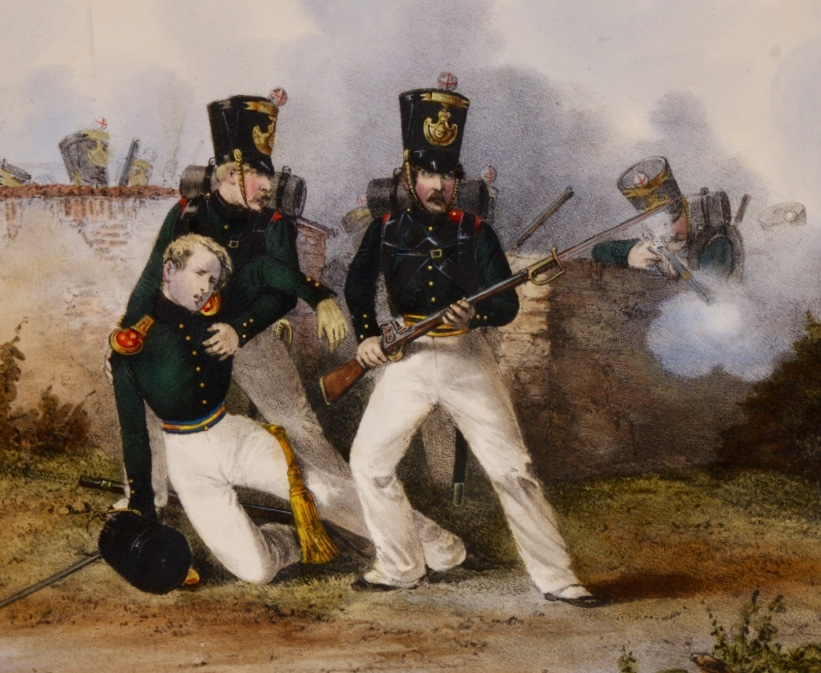
Värmlands fältjägarkår in the First Schleswig War

Under Helin's leadership the Regiment became increasingly independent, carrying out volunteer campaigns in Europe. Helin was part of the pan-national Scandinavism movement. From 1840 to 1845, members of the Regiment, including Johan Fridolf Helin, volunteered in the First Schleswig War and was victorious. He developed a friendship with Carl Gustaf Löwenhielm, who was the supreme commander of the Swedish-Norwegian contingent of volunteers fighting for Denmark in the war with success, and served as his lieutenant commander-in-chief at the island of Funnen. The military forces of 4,000 men later transferred to the Danish Armed Forces, became known as the Occupational Corps. On 5 June 1848, he participated in the First Battle of Dybbøl, where Denmark and the Scandinavian Expeditionary Forces were victorious. On 23 April 1849, the Expeditionary Forces were defeated at the Battle of Kolding. On 6 July 1849, Helin was part of the Danish victory at the Battle of Fredericia. On 25 July 1850, at the Battle of Isted, the Scandinavian Forces defeated Schleswig-Holstein. During the battle the Scandinavian forces suffered great casualties with Helin sustaining an injury to his left shoulder and Major General Schleppegrell being killed in action.

== Intermediary Period ==
In 1860, he was promoted to First Major of the Realm, equivalent to the contemporary office of sergeant major and with a rank of Adjutant General of the Swedish Armed Forces. He was also simultaneously given the rank of colonel-lieutenant of the Värmland Regiment and vice-commandant of Värmland County Command.

In 1871, he was appointed Colonel of the Värmland Regiment, and Chief of the Royal Infantry Regiment. He served as the Commandant-General of the Infantry Division from 1870 until 1873. He was also assigned the honorary position of supreme commandant of the Southern Garrison Command.

== Second Schleswig War ==
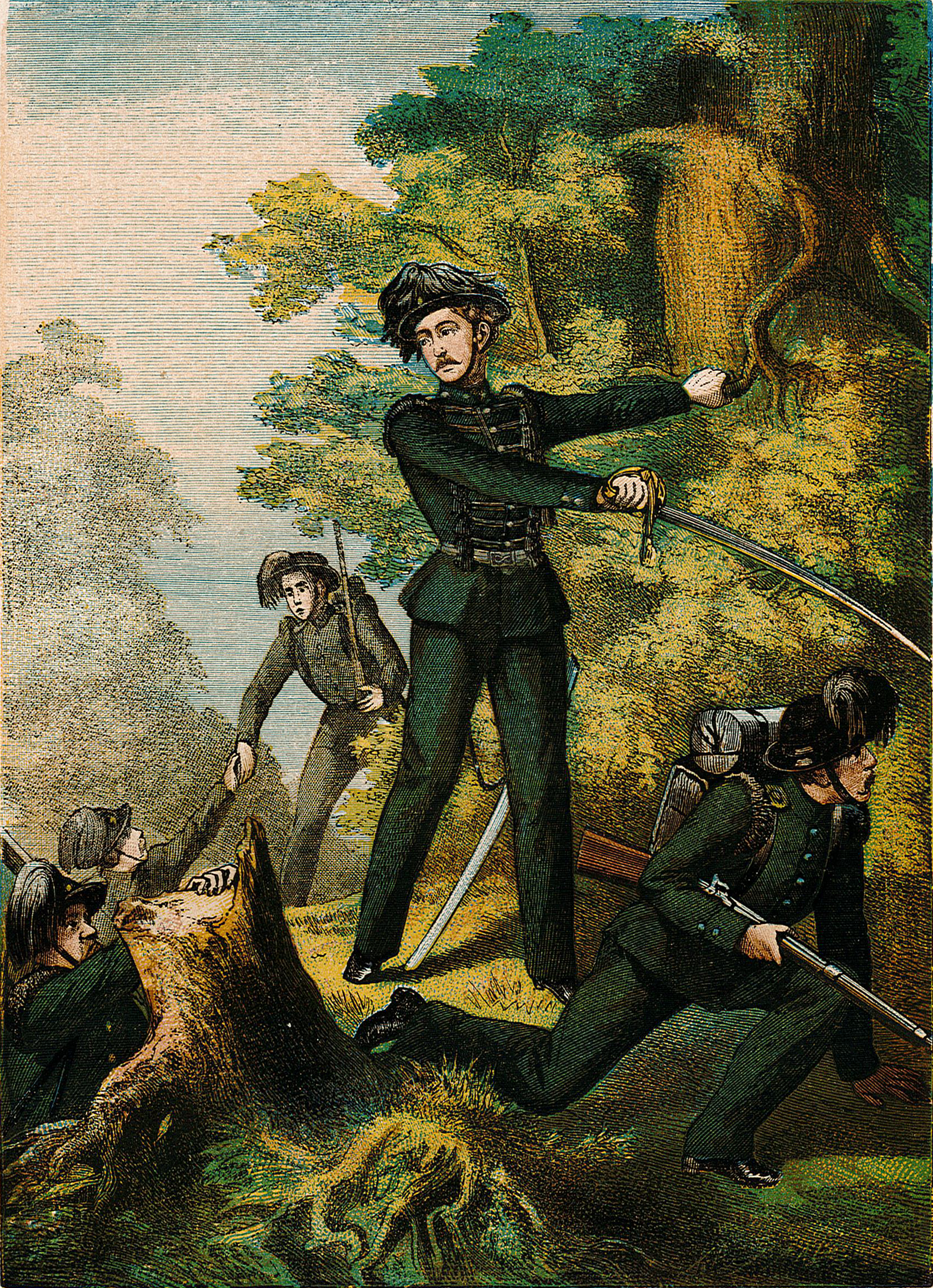
Johan Fridolf Helin, 1866

In the Second Schleswig War of 1864, Fridolf served as commander-in-chief of the Swedish-Norway Expeditionary Forces supporting Denmark and lieutenant commander-in-chief of the Expeditionary Force for a second time. On 2 February 1864, Helin was part of the Battle of Mysunde under the command of General Georg Gerlach which resulted in a Danish victory. From 7 April 1864 and 18 April 1864, Helin was also part of the Battle of Dybbøl which resulted in Prussian victory. The Second Schleswig War concluded with a defeat for the Danish forces and Helin returned to Värmland, Sweden.

== Later life ==
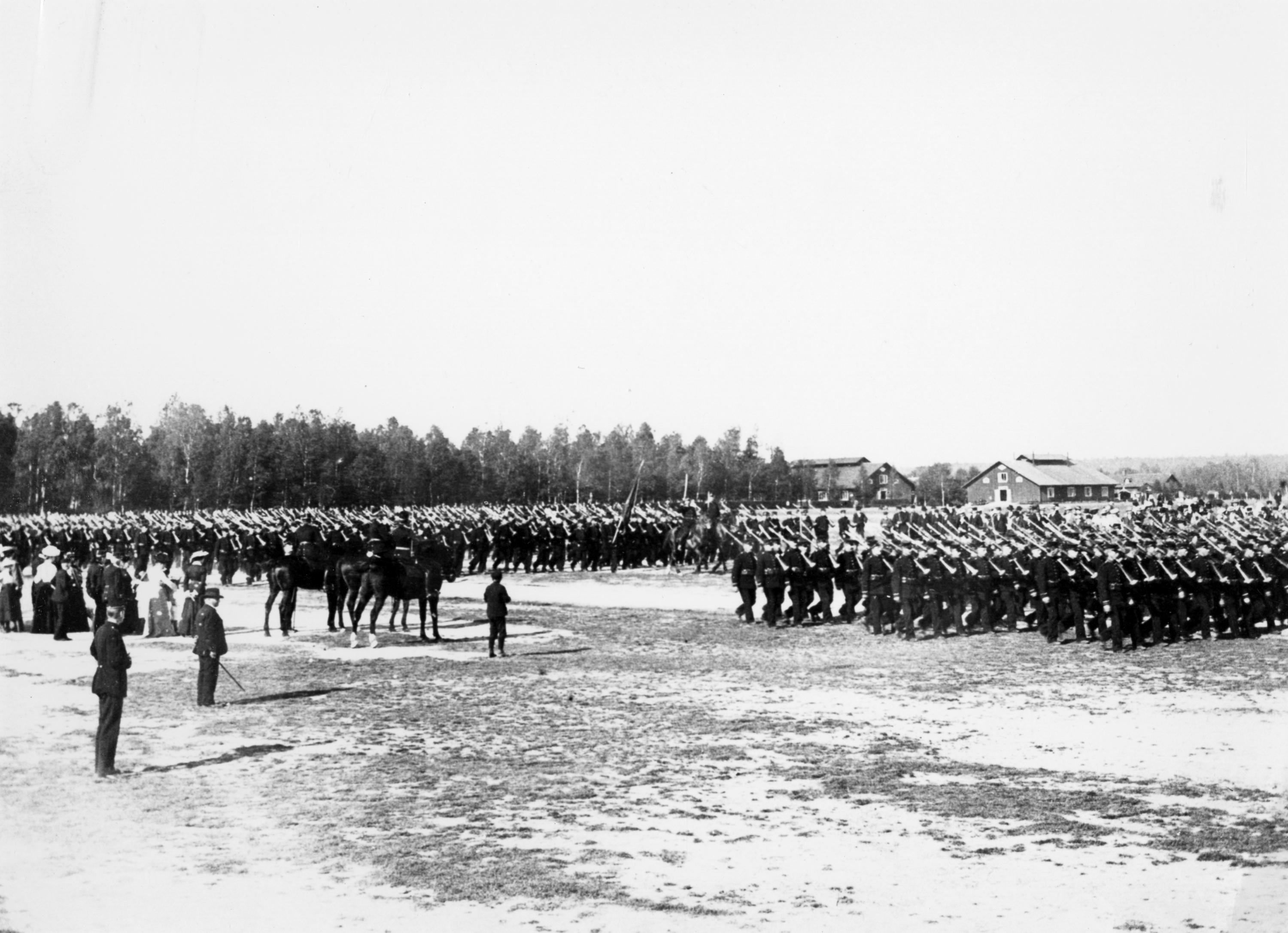
Värmlands fältjägarkår

Helin lived in the Officer's Manor under and after his tenure. He remained as an Honorary member of the Regiment until his death and attended parades as well as other engagements. He married Maria Lovisa Löwenhielm in 1856. Maria Lovisa came from an influential family and her granduncle once removed was Fredrick I of Sweden. Maria Lovisa Löwenhielm’s uncle Fredrik Adolf Löwenhielm was married to Johan Fridolf Helin's paternal aunt Augusta Löwenhielm (born: von Fresen).

Fridolf Helin was awarded Knighthood of the Royal Order of the Sword and Knighthood of the Royal Order of the Polar Star. Helin was the owner of “Kloster Herrgård” (English: Monastery Palace), named after his family's religious involvement. The estate was the first “sheet metal rolling mill” in Sweden and largest gunpowder producer in Sweden during Fridolf fathers ownership. He further owned estates in Stockholm, Uppsala, Luleå, and multiple locations in Southern Sweden.
