= Gustaf Helin =

Swedish industrialist and politician

Johan Gustaf Henrik Helin or Gustaf Helin (born 1881 in Fritsla, Älvsborg County) was a Swedish businessman, industrialist and estate-lord. He was the seventh patriarch of the Helin family.

== Biography ==
Johan Gustaf Henrik Helin (1881-) was the eldest son of Johan Gustaf Helin and Maria Augusta Svensson.

In 1904, Gustaf Helin was appointed chairman of Spirit Factory Petterberg PR Borås. The CEO at the time, Victor Theodor Engwall, was Gustaf's mentor in business.

From 1906 to 1909, the Helin family’s spirit factory expanded into vines, brandy and other liquors, which at the time was harder to produce. The factory had to expand its operations due to heavy liquor restrictions and increased taxation during the early 20th century.

In 1909, Victor Theodor Engwall died. The Helin family continued a close partnership with the Engwall family. The family's partners included Ernst Victor Engwall, Knut Emil Engwall and Carl Fredrik Engwall.

Johan Gustaf Henrik Helin was also a close friend of Paul Toll, who had been a classmate of Gustaf Helin, while the two studied at Borås School of Technology (Swedish: Borås Tekniska Elementarskola), predecessor to Sven Eriksonsgymnasiet in Borås.

Johan Gustaf Henrik Helin was a representative of the Borås industrial society and a member of the Swedish Central Bank Committee. He was appointed as Council of the Swedish Central Bank Committee in 1918.

In 1922, Gustaf Helin was appointed as CEO and chairman of Stockholmssystemet och Vin- & Spritcentralen.

Subsequent to Johan Gustaf Henrik Helin's father, Johan Gustaf Helin, dying, he inherited the family fortune. Gustaf Helin relocated to Stockholm and married Anna Maria Eklund. The couple had one child Bo Henrik Gustaf Helin. In Stockholm, Gustaf Helin was noted as an industrialist, estate mogul and landlord.
