= Greger Helin =

Swedish activist and politician

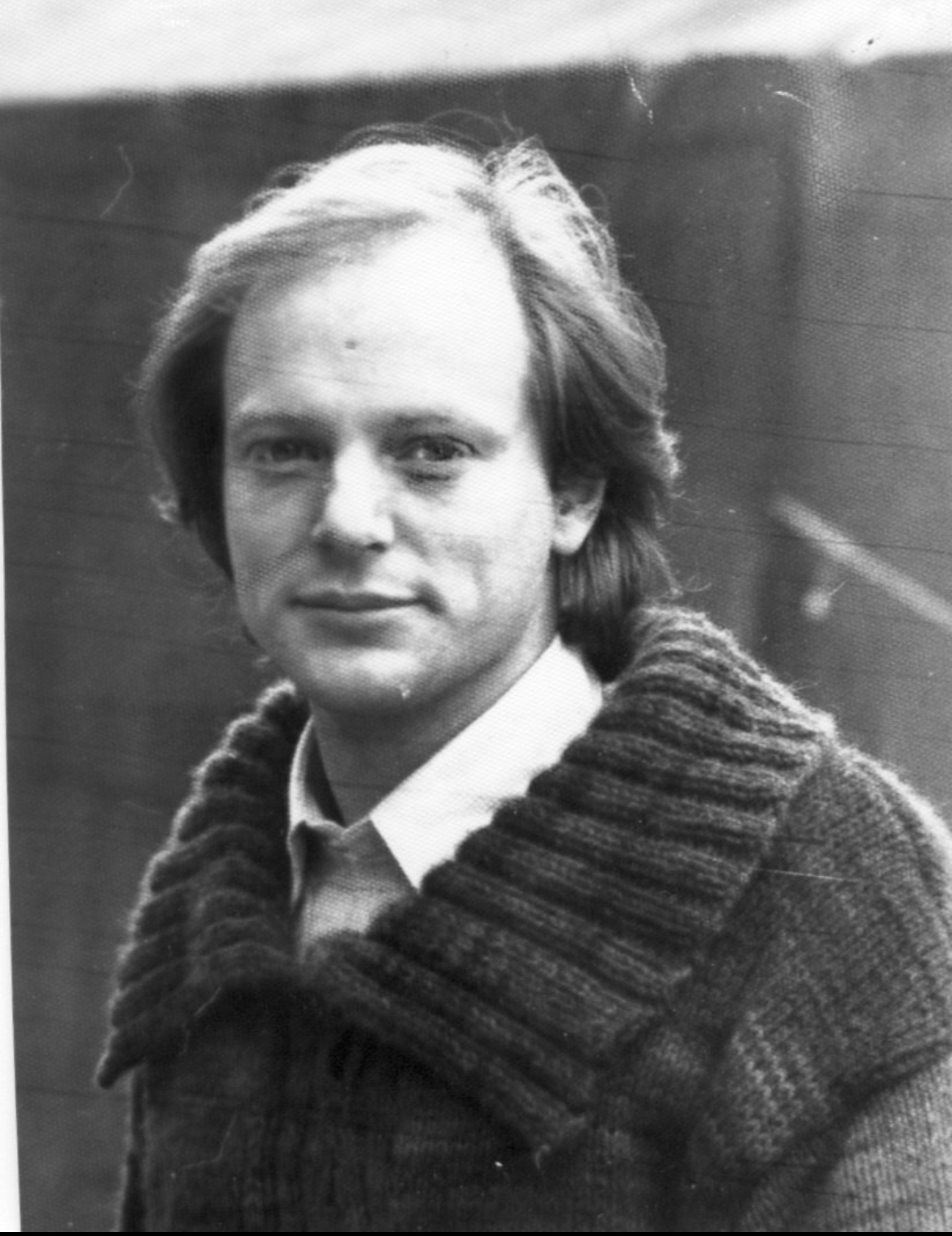
Greger Johan Gustaf Helin

Greger Johan Gustaf Helin (English pronunciation: [ˈgrɛgər joʊˈhɑn ˈgustɑf ˈhɛlɪn]; born 18 November 1947 - 4 November 2025) was a Swedish activist, bureaucrat and legation.

== Biography ==
Helin is the third son of Inga Karin Emilia Engwall and Bo Henrik Gustaf Helin.

Helin was drafted by the Swedish army in 1967. He refused to attend his military service due to his pacifist beliefs. In 1967, he was initially sentenced to one month in prison for claiming conscientious objector status on the basis of sincerely held ethical beliefs and not attending his civil duties. In 1968, he was sentenced to an additional two months of prison. In 1969, he was ultimately sentenced to six months of hard labour prison. In prison he became activist and later co-leader of the prison rebellion of 1970. The movement initiated hunger strikes throughout prisons in Sweden. The purpose of the strike was to bring awareness to the still utilised forced labor, the inhumane design of prison yards and how prison wardens had converted community rooms into unauthorised isolation wards. The strikes resulted in more widespread awareness surrounding issues within the penal system in Sweden. After six days of hunger strike the Swedish Prison and Probations Service announced its yet largest reform. He was a coordinator of the Swedish National Association for the Humanization of Correctional Services. In the 1970s, Greger Helin worked at the Swedish Social Services.

He acted as an anti-war activist in the Vietnam protests of the 1970s. He was appointed deputy director of the Social Services. He was the Deputy Director & Coordinator of the Älvsjö-Project. He was further the Director and Chair of the Älvsjö Community Centre in Stockholm.

Helin was appointed as Supervisor and Secretary of Canadian Youth in Sweden. In the 1980s, he acted as Swedish legation to Japan and served as representative of the Swedish Welfare Model. Helin was the co-author of “Nätverksboken, om mötets möjligheter” (The Networkbook, about the meetings possibilities), and Community Approaches to Child Welfare (chapter: Crossing Reality - Building Networks around Families in Crisis).
