= Clemens Johannes Helin II =

Clemens Johannes Helin II or Clemens Helin I (10 November 1710 - 29 November 1775) was a Swedish theologist, priest and Representative of the Clergy in Parliament. He was the second patriarch of the Helin family.

== Biography ==
Clemens Johannes Helin ll (1702-1775) was the son of Clemens Johannes Helin l and Christina Flodin. He obtained a doctorate in 1732 and became the In-House-Priest of Countess Ulrica Juliana Brahe. In 1733, he was transferred to the manor of the President of the Mountain Department of Sweden Conrad Ribbing. In 1740, Clemens Helin was the Vice-preses of the Clergy Conference. Clemens was appointed as Provost of Gränna Parish and Visingö Parish in 1755. He was Speaker of the Clergy Conference in 1760. In 1772, Clemens Helin obtained the title of Theological Doctorate. Clemens attended Parliament as Representative of the Clergy in 1746 and 1751.

He was married to Wendela Christina Hielmgren (1713–1794), who was the eldest child of Clemens l classmate and first lector in theology Magnus Hielmgrehn (1679-).

== Bibliography ==
- 1745 – Likpredikan över fru Elsa Manquer, kyrkoherde i Vetlanda Sven Blidbergs maka hållen i Vetlanda kyrka den 13 november 1744. Utgiven 1745 i Stockholm.
- 1772 – Likpredikan vid kyrkoherde i Myresjö och Lannaskede magister Jonæ Virganders jordfästning uti Myresjö kyrka den 27 november 1750. Utgiven 1772 i Karlskrona.
- Likpredikan över prosten och kyrkoherden i Hakarps församling Andreas Ståhl hållen uti Hakaprs kyrka den 6 april 1764. Utgiven i Växjö.

=== Manuscripts ===
- 1758 – Berättelse om Gränna kyrkia, prästegård och församling samt de märkvärdigheter, som därstädes finnas månde, avgiven den 30 januari 1758.
- 1764 – Kort beskrivning över Gränna kyrka, prästegård, stads- och landsförsamling, daterad den 25 april 1764.
