= Marguerite Augusta Marie Löwenhielm, duchesse de Fitz-James =

French mycologist and author (1830–1915)

Marguerite Augusta Marie Löwenhielm
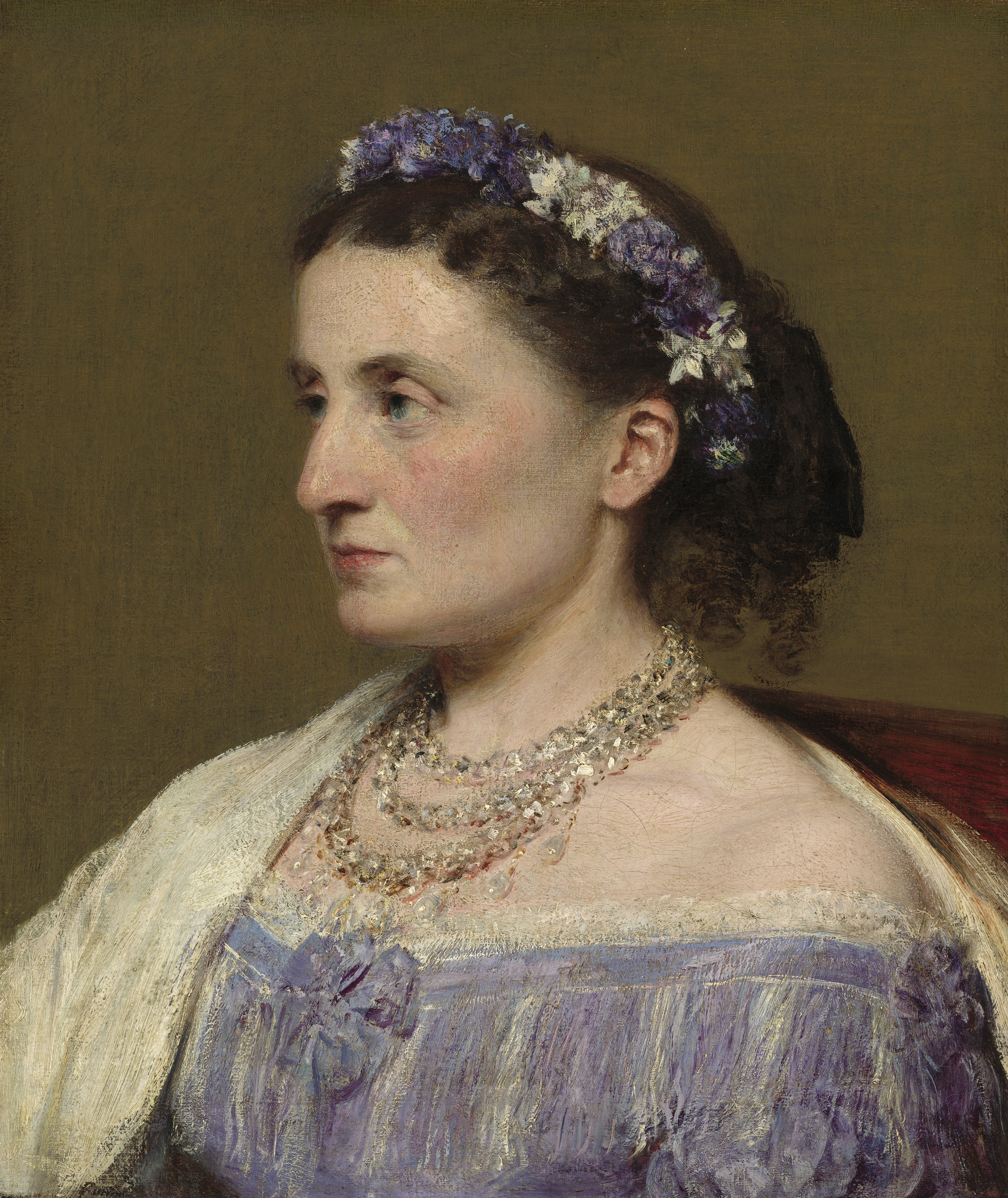
- Portrait of the duchess by Henri Fantin-Latour
- Born: July 27, 1830; Paris
- Died: March 19, 1915 (aged 84); Montjustin

Marguerite Augusta Marie Löwenhielm (27 July 1830 – 19 March 1915) was a French mycologist and author during the 19th and early 20th centuries who studied the effectiveness of new "Americanist" varieties of grapevine in surviving the harmful insect pest Phylloxera.

== Biography ==
=== Early life ===
Marguerite Marie was born on 27 July 1830 in Paris to Count Gustaf Löwenhielm and Cléonice de Baguet. Her father, nearly sixty at the time of her birth, raised her like the son he'd always wanted. She was taught Latin, biology, mathematics, and drawing. From an early age, she became interested in horsemanship and practiced riding under a Scottish equerry. Winemaking and grape cultivation quickly became another passion of Marguerite's. Introduced to the family trade by her maternal grandmother, Marguerite assisted in producing small batches of wine on a plot of land south of Paris.

=== Marriage ===
In 1847, Marguerite was presented to King Louis Philippe I and Queen Marie Amélie in a private audience. Four years later, she married Duke Edouard de Fitz-James and had four children with him.

Over the following years, the duke pursued an idle but lavish lifestyle at the racetracks and social clubs of Paris. It was during this period that he commissioned a portrait of Marguerite by esteemed painter Henri Fantin-Latour. However, growing debts and expenditures caused the Fitz-James to steadily fall into financial difficulty. At the same time, the duke and duchess's relationship deteriorated and they grew apart.

=== Agricultural studies ===
By 1885, the Duchess had fully withdrawn from Parisian social life and was spending almost all her time in the southern countryside. While living among the rural farmers in land she had recently inherited, she took a deeper interest in local agricultural science. In particular, Marguerite was invested in the problem of the Phylloxera, a pest insect which destroyed grape harvests at staggering rates. Learning of American strains of grape which were resistant to the pest from a local farmer familiar with agriculture, Marguerite adopted the "Americanist" view of combating harmful pests. Rather than applying more chemicals and pesticides, she sought to introduce hardier strains of grape to the region to combat the Phylloxera.

After planting several hundred hectares of imported American varieties of grapevine, Marguerite began writing articles for scientific journals on her techniques in combating the pest and advocating for the importation of more hardy varieties of grapevine.

== Selected works ==
- Les Vignes américaines. Revue des deux Mondes, 3rd period, vol. 44, 1881 (p. 685–694).
- La vigne américaine en Amérique. Revue des Deux Mondes, vol. 45, 1881.
- La vigne américaine en France. Revue des Deux Mondes, vol. 45, 1881.
- La Vigne américaine, le Congrès de Montpellier. Revue des Deux Mondes, vol. 57, 1883.
- La Vigne américaine en 1885. Revue des Deux Mondes, 3rd period, vol. 73, 1886 (p. 919–929).
- Les Congrès viticoles. — 1869 à 1887. Le Correspondant (p. 902–922).
