= Missunde =

Coordinates: 54°31′N 9°43′E

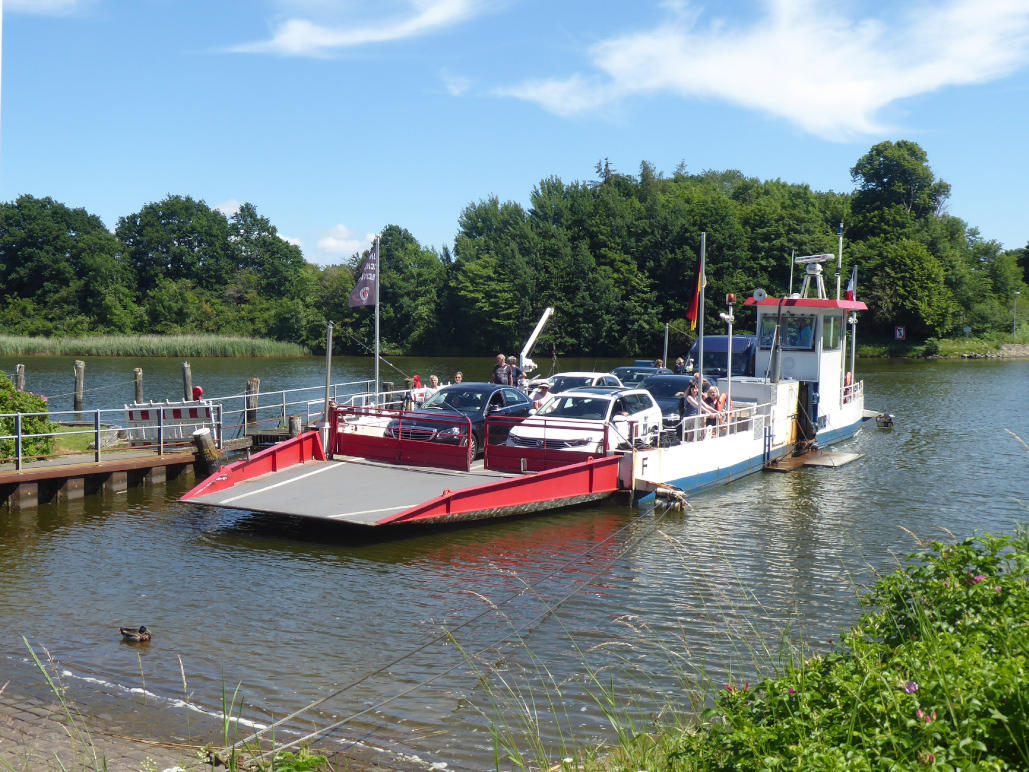
Ferry in Missunde

Missunde (Danish: Mysunde, Old Norse Mjósund "narrow strait") is a village on the Schlei coast of Schwansen in Southern Schleswig in Schleswig-Holstein, Germany, about 7 miles from Schleswig. It is part of the municipality Kosel. It has a ferry over the Schlei to Angeln. Knud Lavard built a fort there in 1120. It is near the east end of the Dannewerk.

The ferry site at Missunde was above all important and up to the 19th century much fought over, since it is at the narrowest place on the Schlei. Missunde was mentioned first in 1115 under the name Versund (= "ferry sound"). Since the Slavic Wends sometimes tried to settle in the area, the ferry site was repeatedly fortified. Thus are in Brodersby (beyond the Schlei in Angeln) the remains of a castle and the Margarethenwalls; but in the middle of the 11th century were several very bloody battles with the Wends.

After King Charles X Gustav of Sweden, together with Brandenburg, had defeated the Polish army near Warsaw in 1656, its troops passed Missunde, where they wreaked destruction on the area. In the Great Northern War at the beginning of the 18th century, war again came to Missunde, and in 1849 in the First and in 1864 in the Second Schleswig War. The 1864 Battle of Mysunde, the first battle of the Second Schleswig War, was memorialized by Erik Henningsen in his painting Captain Hertel at Mysunde. The battle was also an important victory for the Danes, as they held the village against the Prussian infantry despite being outnumbered by 4 to 1. During these battles the inhabitants of Missunde likely fled to the castle in Brodersby.

Since 1960 there has been a vehicle ferry connecting Missunde and Brodersby. In the year 2003 it was renewed.

Until 1928 Missunde belonged to the property district Ornum. Today Missunde has about 500 inhabitants and is set up for tourism. There are a sport boat dock with approximately 30 beds, holiday houses, and catering trade enterprises.
