= Jacquette Löwenhielm =

Swedish noble (1797–1839)

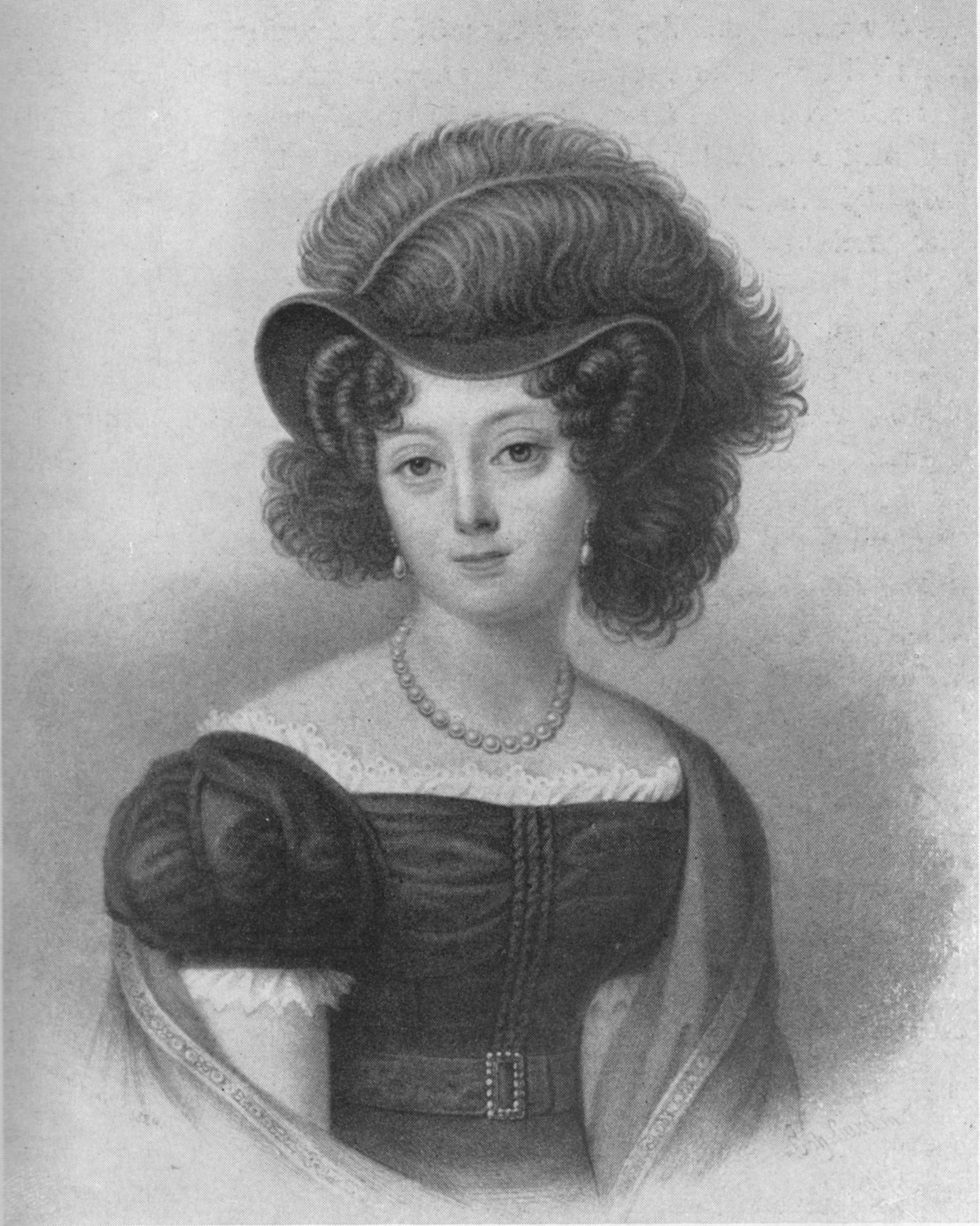
Jaquette Löwenhielm 1824

Gustava Charlotta Jacquette Aurora Gyldenstolpe (4 July 1797 – 7 January 1839, Constantinople) was a Swedish noble and lady-in-waiting. She is known as the mistress of Oscar I of Sweden in circa 1819–1827.

== Biography ==
Jacquette was the daughter of Major General Nils Wexionius, Count Gyldenstolpe (1768–1844), and the salonist Charlotta Aurora De Geer.

Jacquette Gyldenstolpe served as maid of honor to the queen, Hedwig Elizabeth Charlotte of Holstein-Gottorp prior to her marriage. On 18 September 1817, she married Lieutenant General Count Carl Gustaf Löwenhielm and moved with him to his estate in Värmland. The marriage was childless. Jacquette did not like the role of mistress at a country estate, and missed life at court. They moved back to the city when her spouse was appointed chamberlain to the Crown Prince in 1818. At the royal court, Jacquette became a center of the circle around the Crown Prince, alongside her mother, Gustaf Lagebjelke, Mariana Koskull and the wife of the Dutch ambassador, who amused themselves with masquerades and French language amateur theater at Rosersberg Palace. Jacquette and Oscar were pointed out as lovers in many private letters of the time. They behaved informal and intimately with each other and it was noted that Jacquette did not use his title when she spoke to him. Her husband tried to have her removed from court, but was prevented by her mother.

In 1822, Crown Prince Oscar was sent on his trip to Europe to find a bride. Jacquette's husband Carl Gustaf Löwenhielm was a part of the entourage, and while he worked for Josephine of Leuchtenberg to be selected among the candidates, Jacquette's mother worked for Princess Marie of Hesse-Kassel. When Josephine was chosen, Carl Gustaf Löwenhielm was entrusted with the arrangements and made many trips to Bavaria in 1822–23. Upon the arrival of Josephine and the queen Desiree Clary in 1823, Jacquette, similar to the king's mistress Mariana Koskull, was appointed lady-in-waiting to the queen. In 1824, her husband was appointed Swedish envoy to Constantinople, where he remained for three years.

During his absence, Jacquette remained in Sweden. Jacquette bore a daughter by the name of Anna Oscara, who has been pointed out as the daughter of Oscar. The baby was given up to burgher-class foster-parents, and was given their last name. In 1827, Jacquette's husband Carl Gustaf Löwenhielm returned to Sweden and unsuccessfully interrogated her about the rumors of her affair with the crown prince and how the luxurious decoration of her apartment had been financed.

Jacquette divorced Löwenhielm on 1 September 1829 on the grounds of different characters. Her second marriage to the Finnish Baron Uno von Troil (1803–1839) took place on 21 August 1838. Both spouses died within a year of the marriage in Turkey, where Baron von Troil held a diplomatic post. This marriage too was childless.

== Sources ==
- Lars Elgklou (1978). Bernadotte. Historien – eller historier – om en familj. Stockholm: Askild & Kärnekull Förlag (Swedish)
- Robert Braun (1950). Silvertronen. En bok om drottning Josefine av Sverige-Norge. Stockholm: Norlins förlag. sid. 72–79. (Swedish)
- Gyldenstolpe nr 35
