= Konga =

- Location within Kronoberg Location within Sweden
- Coordinates: 56°30′N 15°07′E
- Country: Sweden
- Province: Småland
- County: Kronoberg County
- Municipality: Tingsryd Municipality

Area
  - Total: 1.06 km^{2} (0.41 sq mi)

Population (31 December 2010)
  - Total: 476
  - Density: 448/km^{2} (1,160/sq mi)
- Time zone: UTC+1 (CET)
  - Summer (DST): UTC+2 (CEST)

Konga (Swedish pronunciation: [ˈkʊ̂ŋːa]) is a locality situated in Tingsryd Municipality, Kronoberg County, Sweden with 476 inhabitants in 2010.
