= Carl Gustaf Löwenhielm =

19th century Swedish general and diplomat

Count Carl Gustaf Löwenhielm
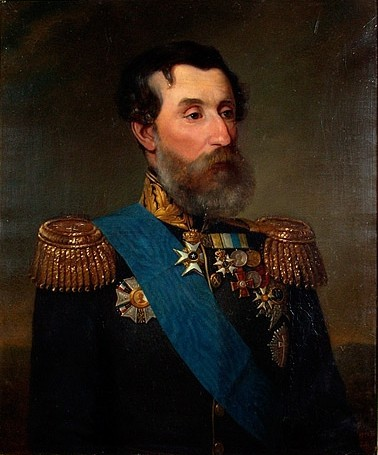
- Portrait of Count Löwenhielm by Carl Wilhelm Nordgren.
- Born: January 30, 1790; Long estate, Grums, Värmland, Sweden
- Died: May 18, 1858 (aged 68); Long estate, Grums, Värmland, Sweden
- Education: Uppsala University
- Spouse(s): Jacquette Aurora Gyldenstolpe (m. 1817; div. 1828) Countess Natalie Alexandra von Buxhoeveden (m. 1840; died 1858)
- Children: 5
- Relatives: Carl Löwenhielm (relative)
- Military career
- Allegiance: Sweden
- Branch: Swedish Army
- Service years: 1809–1856
- Rank: Lieutenant General
- Unit: Life Regiment Hussars
- Commands: 3rd Military District; Swedish-Norwegian auxiliary troops on Funen
- Conflicts: Napoleonic Wars; Battle of Borodino; Battle of Leipzig; Battle of Paris; First Schleswig War
- Awards: Knight and Commander of the Seraphim; Commander of the Polar Star; Knight of the Sword; Grand Cross of the Dannebrog

Count Carl Gustaf Löwenhielm (January 30, 1790 – May 18, 1858) was a Swedish diplomat and Lieutenant general. A close friend and confidant to King Oscar I, he had a distinguished military career fighting in major coalition engagements of the Napoleonic Wars—including the Battle of Borodino and the Battle of Leipzig, later commanding Swedish-Norwegian troops on Funen during the First Schleswig War. As a diplomat, he served as Sweden's minister to the Ottoman Empire, where he negotiated a Black Sea maritime treaty, and spent over a decade as the envoy to the imperial court in Vienna. In his later career, he served as the County Governor of Gothenburg and Bohus County.

== Early life ==
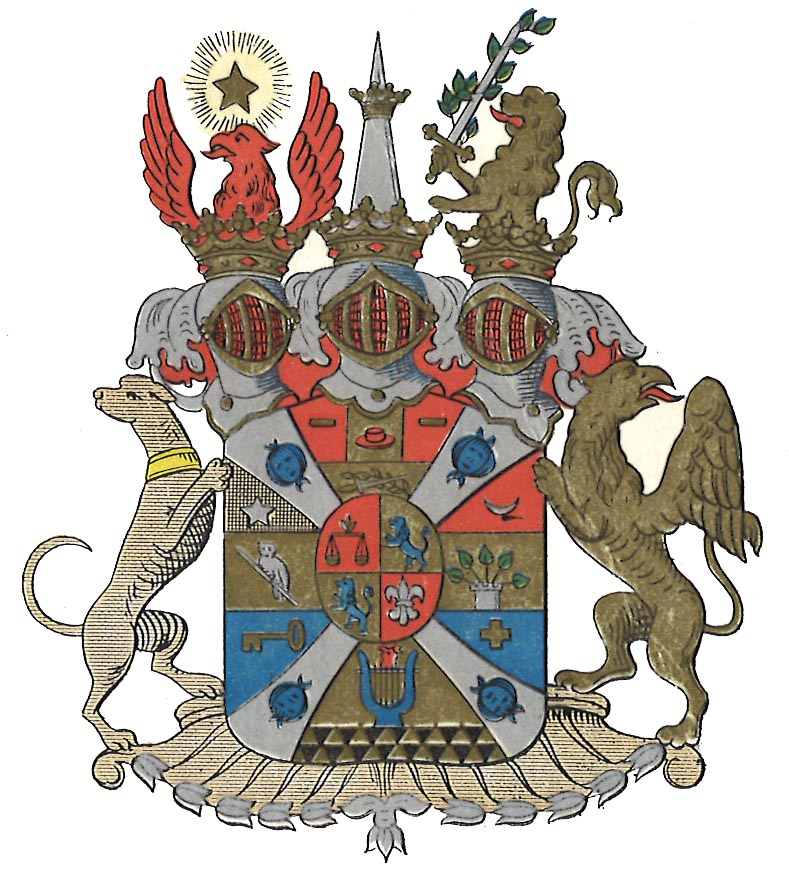
Löwenhielm's coat of arms.

Carl Gustaf Löwenhielm was born at Long (or Lång) in Värmland on January 30, 1790. His father was captain Carl Gustaf Löwenhielm and his mother was Agneta Sofia Wrangel, of the noble Wrangel family. He was a count by birthright and he was born into the comital branch of the Löwenhielm family. In 1807, he enrolled in Uppsala University.

== Military career ==
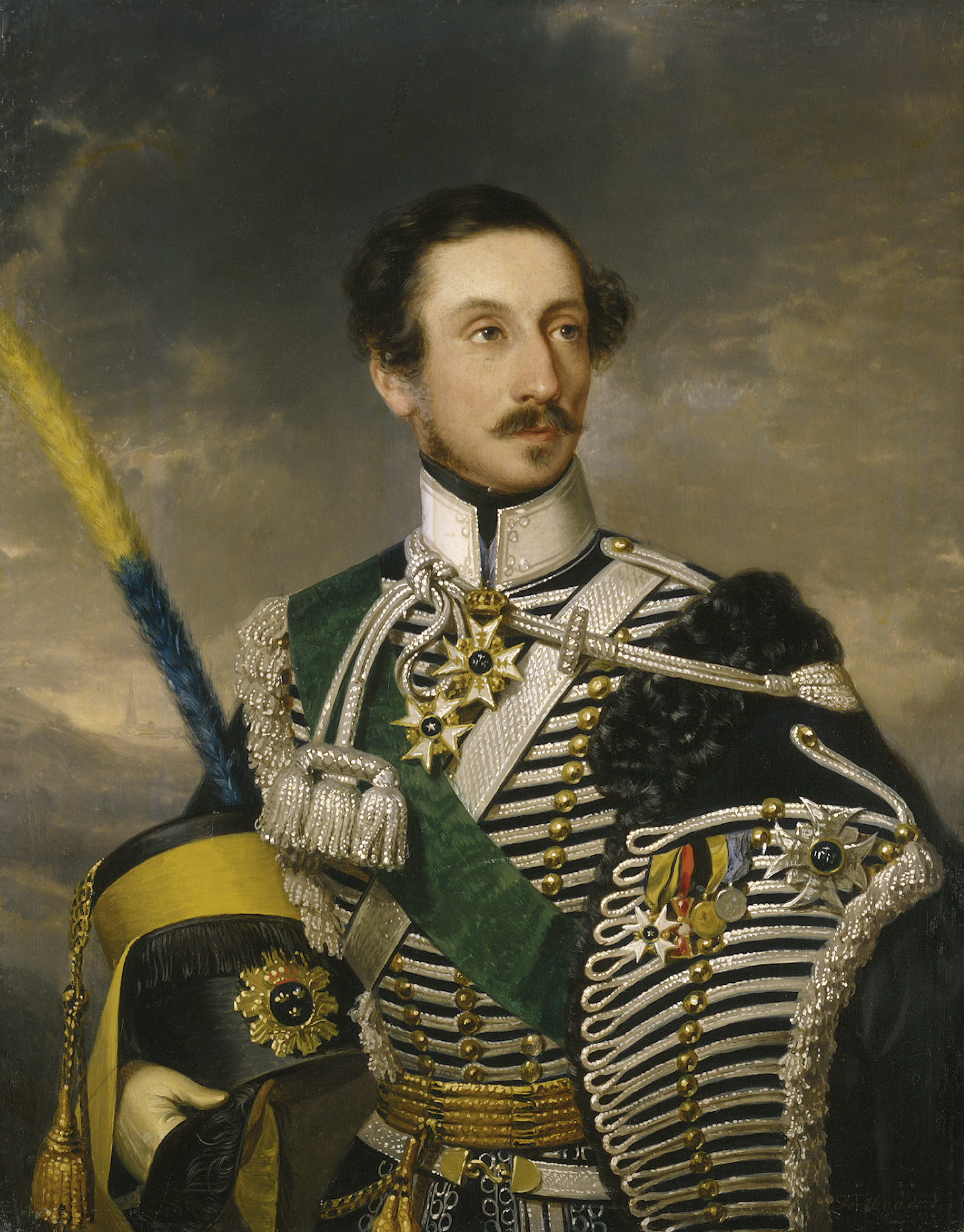
Carl Gustav Löwenhielm painted by Leopold Fertbauer.

Löwenhielm began his military career in 1809 as a cornet in the Life Regiment Hussars. He became a cavalier for the 12-year-old Crown Prince Oscar in 1811, this would lead to a friendship between the two. In 1812, he would be promoted to lieutenant in the aforementioned regiment.

In 1812, Löwenhielm's relative Carl Löwenhielm followed him to Saint Petersburg where he was serving as an attaché. During his time in Russia, he served as an adjutant for Generals Friedrich von Korff, Levin August von Bennigsen, and Emperor Alexander I. Löwenhielm was present at the Battle of Borodino in 1812, Battle of Leipzig in 1813, and the Battle of Paris in 1814. He was awarded a Gold Medal for Bravery in the Field, and two Russian honours which were the "In Memory of the Patriotic War of 1812" Medal and he was made a Knight 4th Class of the Imperial Russian Order of Saint Vladimir for his service during the Napoleonic Wars. Following his service in Russia, Löwenhielm rejoined Crown Prince Oscar's court in 1815. In the same year, he was made a captain (ryttmastare) in the Life Regiment Hussars. In 1818 he was appointed chief of staff to Crown Prince Oscar and in 1821 he was given the colonelcy for the army and general staff. In the same year, he was made a Knight of the Royal Order of the Sword. In 1829, he was made a Commander of the Royal Order of the Polar Star.

In 1835, Löwenhielm was promoted to major general in the army. He was promoted to lieutenant general in 1844, and in 1847, commander-in-chief of the 3rd military district. He was made Knight Grand Cross of the Danish Order of the Dannebrog, and Knight and Commander of the Royal Order of the Seraphim in 1848 and 1849 respectively. Sometime during his life, he was also made a Grand Officer of the French Legion of Honour. During the First Schleswig War in 1848, he became commander-in-chief of the Swedish troops on Funen. He applied for leave in 1854, due to failing eyesight. However, he was only discharged from military service in 1856.

== Diplomatic and administrative career ==
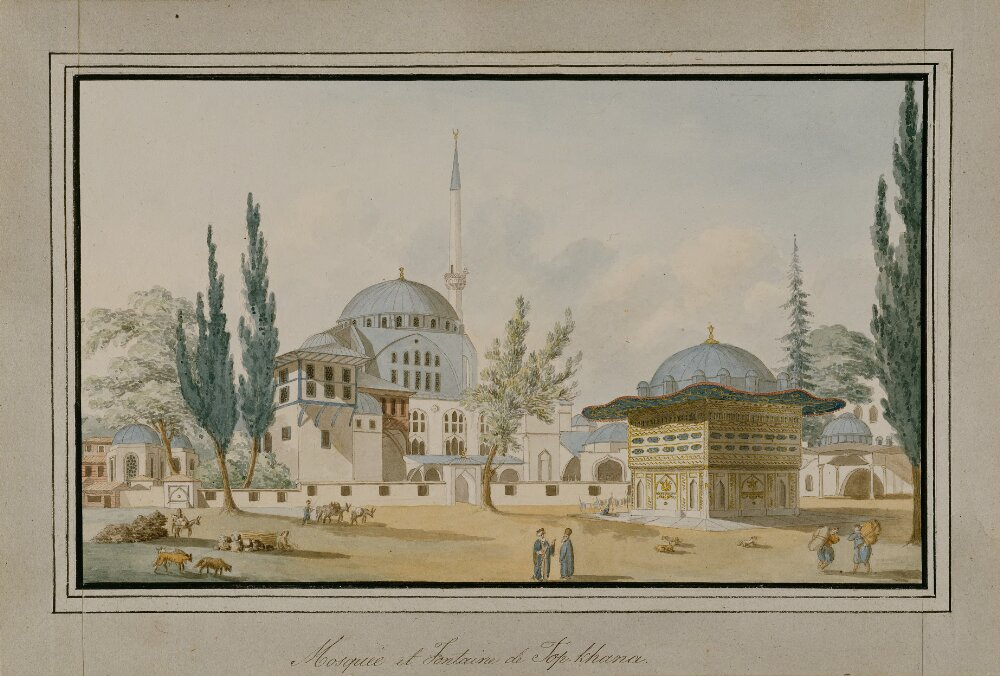
A sketch of a mosque and kiosque by Carl Gustaf Löwenhielm

In the summer of 1822, on behalf of Crown Prince Oscar, Löwenhielm asked for the hand of Josephine of Leuchtenberg, which was successful. In 1824 he was appointed to the equivalent of Swedish ambassador to the Ottoman Empire and served in Istanbul until 1830. Löwenhielm detested his assignment to Turkey and considered the time there a waste of years. He nonetheless managed to accomplish a deal with the Ottoman government in 1827, through which Swedish merchant ships were allowed to pass through the Bosphorus. During his time in Turkey, he produced sketchbooks. After his years in Turkey, from 1830 to 1843, he worked as a Swedish envoy to the Imperial Court in Vienna.

Löwenhielm served as County Governor of Gothenburg and Bohus County between 1843 and 1845. As County Governor, he was unpopular with the bourgeosie of the county and during a visit to the county in 1848, he was the subject of attacks made by a local liberal press.

== Personal life and death ==
Löwenhielm married his first wife, Jacquette Löwenhielm in 1817. She was a mistress of King Oscar I. Despite, Jacquette's relationship with the King, Löwenhielm remained amicable towards him. Their relationship caused Löwenhielm great anguish and the couple divorced in 1828. The marriage did not bear children.

In 1840, Löwenhielm married his second wife Countess Natalie Alexandra von Buxhoeveden (1814-1867), a granddaughter of Friedrich Wilhelm von Buxhoeveden. This time the marriage was a happy one, and as Löwenhielm had inherited a large sum of money from his father he retired from diplomatic duties and settled in Värmland at Long, the family estate.

The couple had 5 children.

- Carl Gustaf Löwenhielm (1841–1858), cadet at Military Academy Karlberg.
- Natalia Löwenhielm (1842–1868), married lieutenant general and state councilor Johan Henrik Rosensvärd.
- Natalia Agnes Giulia Löwenhielm (1845–1892), died unmarried.
- Carl Axel Gudmund Löwenhielm (1848–1848).
- Natalia Elisabet Helena Sofia Löwenhielm (1851–1851).

Died on his estate Long in Värmland on May 18, 1858.

== Personality and character ==
Löwenhielm was described by contemporaries as a unique and highly cultivated individual who defined himself as a steadfast man of duty and a servant of the Crown. As a diplomat, he was characterized by strong self-esteem and unyielding conservatism. He was also recognized as an excellent stylist and a man of shifting moods, possessing a cold and frequently pessimistic view of the world and his peers, which were documented in his private diaries and memoirs.

In his private life, Löwenhielm was straightforward. Toward subordinates who had earned his trust, he was known to be both kind and humorous. In his diplomatic and administrative posts, he applied military discipline. This alienated some colleagues, who upon closer reflection nevertheless realized and acknowledged his honest intentions and recognized his care for the state.

== Orders and decorations ==
=== Swedish honours ===
- (Sweden) Knight and Commander of the Royal Order of the Seraphim (1849)
- (Sweden) Commander of the Royal Order of the Polar Star (1829)
- (Sweden) Knight of the Royal Order of the Sword (1818)
- (Sweden) Gold Medal for Bravery in the Field (1814)

=== Foreign honours ===
- (Denmark) Knight Grand Cross of the Order of the Dannebrog (1848)
- (Russian Empire) Knight 4th Class of the Imperial Russian Order of Saint Vladimir (1814)
- (Russian Empire) "In Memory of the Patriotic War of 1812" Medal (1814)
- (France) Grand Officer of the French Legion of Honour

== See also ==
- List of knights of the Order of the Seraphim
- List of governors of Gothenburg and Bohus County
