= Clemens Johannes Helin I =

English artist

- Born: 25 July 1679
- Died: 16 February 1753 (aged 73)
- Other name: Johan Helin I
- Occupations: Theology and linguistics scholar

Clemens Johannes Helin I or Johan Helin I (25 July 1679 – 16 February 1753) was a Swedish scholar in theology and linguistics. He is the earliest patriarch of the Helin family cadet branch and was one of the founders of Svenska Tungomålsgillet (The Swedish Tongue Guild).

== Biography ==
Clemens Johannes Helin I, born 25 July 1679, was the illegitimate child of Philippe-Louis de Hénin, 7th Count of Bossu (1646–1688) 10th Prince of Chimey, and Katarzyna Scholastyka Sapieha, the daughter of Hetman Kazimierz Jan Sapieha (German: Clemens Johannes Sapieha). He was half brother of Jan Klemens Branicki.

Clemens Johannes Helin I was appointed as Secretary of The Antiques Archives in 1725. Helin was commissioned for the establishment of the Swedish Royal Academy by Chancellor President Anders Johan von Höpken in 1739. Johan was primarily outspoken critic of the "natural sciences" and thus was not included as founding member. Johan Helin l established Svenska Tungomålsgillet (The Swedish Tongue Guild), an opposition movement to the Swedish Royal Academy with theological support. Frederick I of Sweden received a letter from the movement in 1740. Due to the influence wielded by the Swedish Royal Academy within political circles, the Swedish Tongue Guild was a short-lived movement. Johan is noted to have developed friendships with Gustaf Benzelstierna, Jacob Faggot, Samuel Schultze, Johan Göstaf Göstafsson Hallman, and other politically influential individuals during the movements span. His eldest daughter Anna Christina Helin married Johan Cavallius owner of "Kölaboda säteri" and captain over the Kronoberg's Regiment.

== Bibliography ==
- Władysław Konopczyński: Branicki Jan Klemens. W: Polski Słownik Biograficzny. T. 2: Beyzym Jan – Brownsford Marja. Kraków: Polska Akademia Umiejętności – Skład Główny w Księgarniach Gebethnera i Wolffa, 1936, s. 404–407. Reprint: Zakład Narodowy im. Ossolińskich, Kraków 1989, ISBN 83-04-03291-0
- Alina Sztachelska-Kokoczka Magnackie dobra Jana Klemensa Branickiego, 2006
