= Bo Henrik Gustaf Helin =

Swedish editor and advertiser

Bo Henrik Gustaf Helin (1910–1962) was a Swedish editor and advertiser. He was the co-owner of the publication ”Maskulinum”. He was the eighth patriarch of the Helin family.

== Biography ==
Helin was the eldest son of Gustaf Helin and Anna Maria Eklund. He was born in “Västra Ryd socken, (Upplands-Bro Kommun) Stockholms län” (English: Västra Ryd Parish (Upplands-Bro municipality), Stockholm County), a region known for grand estates and hosting military regiments.

His early life was spent at the family's estate in the parish. He later moved to the Kloster Herrgård. The Kloster estate in the early 20th century encompassed the whole urban area of Kloster, Hedemora municipality. In 1937, he married Inga Karin Emilia Engwall, the daughter of Knut Emil Engwall and granddaughter of Victor Theodor Engwall.

Bo Henrik Gustaf Helin was a close friend of writer Björn von Rosen [sv] and commander Pedro Ahlmark [sv]. The three managed “Maskulinum” a monthly paper on all men related matter. The company published advertisement for wealthy socialites and was made out of silk, letter and had marbled cuts. In 1943, Helin was appointed chief editor and chairman of the publication. Bertil Almqvist, another friend of the three, was responsible for the publication's art and page design.

Helin invited Evert Taube to the publication. Taube agreed and three joint papers were published. Evert Taube and Helin had already prior to the guest articles been acquainted by both being friends of Paul Toll.

Count Folke Bernadotte of Wisborg wrote about the Swedish shooting movement. in one issue of the publication. Other contributors to Masculinum included illustrator Adolf Hallman, songwriter Einar Moberg, and author Harry Martinson.
