= Carl Löwenhielm =

Swedish diplomat and nobleman (1772–1861)

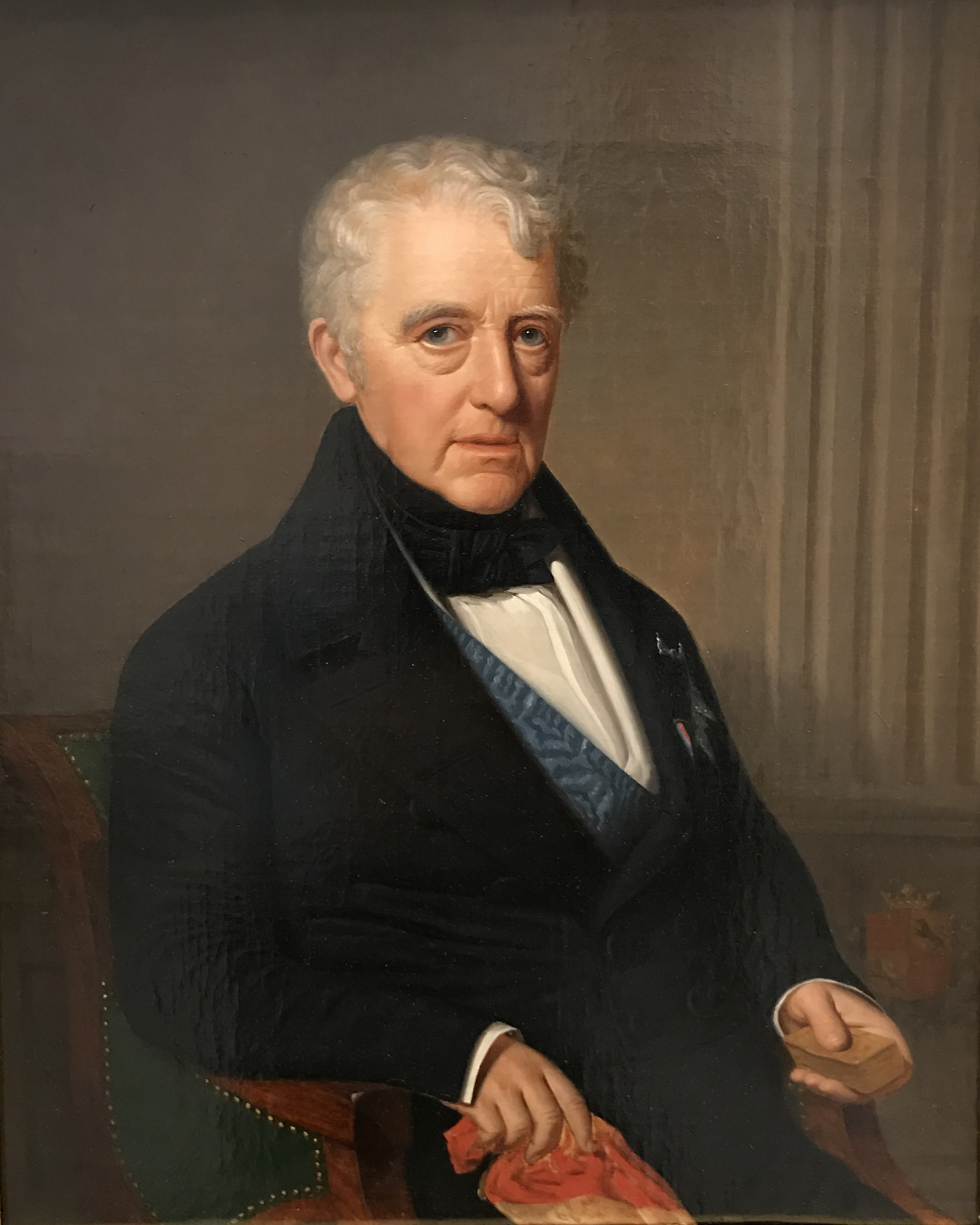
- Born: 3 November 1772; Stockholm, Sweden
- Died: 9 June 1861 (aged 88); Stockholm, Sweden
- Father: Charles XIII of Sweden
- Mother: Augusta von Fersen
- Occupation: Military officer, diplomat, politician

Count Carl Axel Löwenhielm (3 November 1772 – 9 June 1861) was a Swedish military officer, diplomat, and politician.

Löwenhielm was an illegitimate son of King Charles XIII of Sweden and Augusta von Fersen (married to the Chancellor of the Royal Court Fredrik Adolf Löwenhielm) and a half-brother of general and diplomat Gustaf Löwenhielm.

Löwenhielm participated in the war operations in Finland in 1788–1790, in Pomerania in 1807, on the Norwegian border and on Åland in 1809. He was promoted to Lieutenant Colonel in 1808, in 1812 to the General Adjuster, in 1814 to Major General and in 1815 to the Lieutenant-General. Löwenhielm was a member of the Swedish cabinet between 1822–1839 and represented Sweden at the Congress of Vienna.
