= Gustaf Löwenhielm =

Swedish general and diplomat (1771–1856)

His Excellency The High Well-born Count Gustaf Löwenhielm
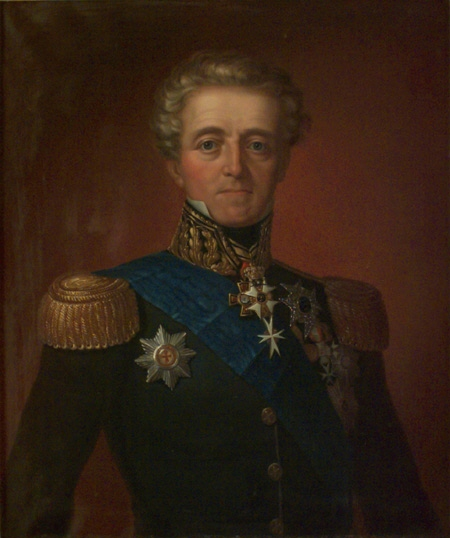
- Gustaf Löwenhielm dressed in the uniform of the Life Guards of Horse, portrayed by Olof Johan Södermark
- Born: Gustaf Carl Fredrik Löwenhielm; 6 October 1771; Stockholm, Sweden
- Died: 29 July 1856 (aged 84); Stockholm, Sweden
- Military career
- Allegiance: Sweden
- Branch: Swedish Army
- Rank: General
- Unit: Life Guards of Horse
- Awards: Royal Order of the Seraphim; Order of the Sword; Lord of the Realm
- Other work: Diplomat

Count Gustaf Carl Fredrik Löwenhielm (6 October 1771 – 29 July 1856) was a Swedish general and diplomat.

== Early life ==
Löwenhielm was born on 6 October 1771 in the Royal Court Parish (Hovförsamlingen), Stockholm County, Sweden, the son of Lord Chancellor, Count Fredric Adolph Löwenhielm (1743–1810) and Countess Augusta Fersen (1754–1846). He was the grandson of Privy Councillor Carl Gustaf Löwenhielm (1701–1768).

== Career ==
Löwenhielm attended the University of Strasbourg from 1781 to 1787. He participated with his regiment in the 1788–90. He was a cavalry inspector 1804–09, colonel and general adjutant in Pomerania and Saxony in 1805–06. In 1808, he was severely wounded at Pyhäjoki and fell into Russian captivity until his release in 1809.

Löwenhielm participated in the election of Charles XIV John to the Swedish throne and served as his envoy to several foreign powers between 1810 until 1837 and as such participated in many important political events. He was also the director of the Royal Theatres (Royal Swedish Opera and the Royal Dramatic Theatre) in 1812-1818 and introduced several lasting reforms to its management.

== Personal life ==
Löwenhielm married Cléonice Ifigenie de Baguet (born on 22 March 1798, in Nîmes, died on 8 May 1853, in Paris) on 18 March 1826, in Paris. She was the daughter of Colonel de Baguet and his wife, née Ducayla.

Löwenhielm was the father of Marguerite Augusta Marie Löwenhielm, duchesse de Fitz-James.

Löwenhielm is buried in Père Lachaise cemetery (Division 14), in Paris.
