= Battle of Mysunde (1864) =

Battle of the Second Schleswig War

- Part of Second Schleswig War
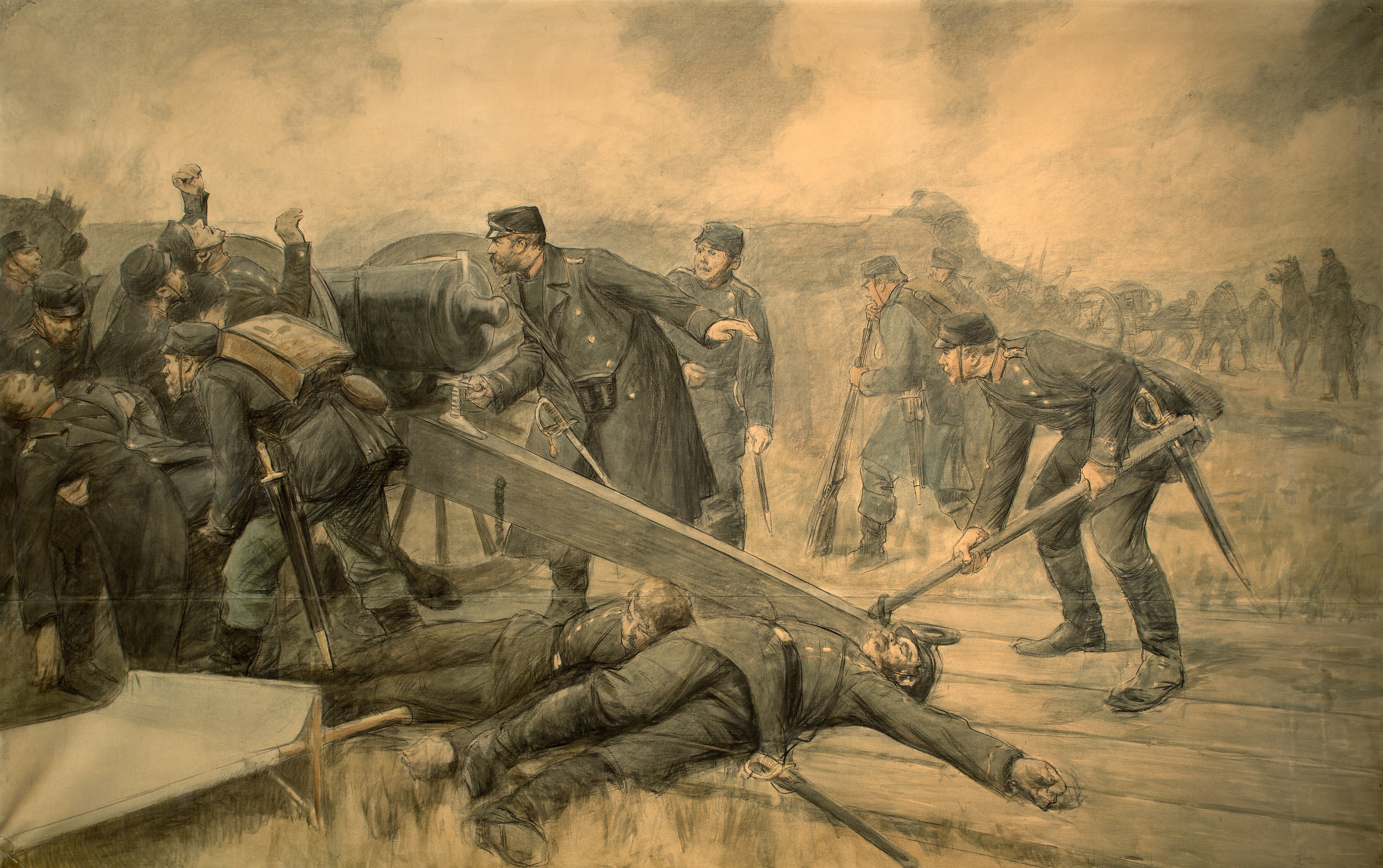
- Captain Hertel at Mysunde; Erik Henningsen, 1914
Date	2 February 1864
Location	Missunde, Schleswig-Holstein, Germany 54°31′10″N 9°43′13″E
Result	Danish victory

Belligerents
Denmark: Duchy of Schleswig; Duchy of Holstein	Prussia

Commanders and leaders
Georg Gerlach	Prince Friedrich Karl

Units involved
18. Regiment, 1. Battalion; 3. Regiment, 1. Battalion; 6. Fortification Battalion	1. Prussian Corps, 10 battalions

Strength
2,500 infantry 20 guns	10,000 infantry 64 guns

Casualties and losses
9 officers killed or wounded 132 enlisted killed or wounded Total: 141 killed or wounded	12 officers killed or wounded 187 enlisted killed or wounded Total: 199 killed or wounded
- Location within Schleswig-Holstein Battle of Mysunde (1864) (Germany)

The Battle of Mysunde on 2 February 1864 was the first battle between the Prusso-Austrian allied army and the Danish army in the Second Schleswig War. The Prussian vanguard force of 10,000 men attempted to break through and outflank the Danish defenses at the Danevirke, but were repulsed by the fortification garrison and two battalions of the Danish army.

== Background ==
Danish public opinion expected the forthcoming war with the German allies to take place at the Danevirke, placing almost mythological belief in the impenetrability of the fortification system. In practice, the fortification system had fallen into disrepair. The barracks for the soldiers had not been built, connecting roads were not constructed, and the obstacles in front of the fortifications had not been put in place. As a result, when the Danish army entered the positions in January, they had a lot of work to do, with the winter frost making digging difficult. In addition, the line of fortifications at the Danevirke was far too long to be adequately defended by the 38,000 man Danish army.

Mysunde itself was a small fishing village of approximately two dozen houses on the south side of the Schlei. It was a part of the eastern fortifications of the Danevirke, but the real importance of the position was due to narrowness of the Schlei at this point. This meant that it was one of the few points where the eastern flank of the Danevirke was not made impenetrable by natural obstacles. Consequently, the defense of the position was of great strategic importance; a breakthrough at the crossing point would allow the Prussians to envelop and surround the Danish forces at the Danevirke, while the Austrians kept the Danes pinned in their positions.

== Battle ==
=== Morning operations ===
The Prussian I Corps under Prince Friedrich Karl of Prussia had begun its advance at 08:00 in the morning on February 2, with the purpose of taking the Danish positions at Kochendorf. However, the Prussians soon discovered that the Danish army had no intention of defending Kochendorf and had retreated northward. By 8:45, the vanguard were able to report that Kochendorf was in Prussian hands. The decision to push on and capture Mysunde was immediately taken. Three Brigades remained in reserve, while the rest of the Corps continued the advance. By 10 o'clock, Major v. Krohn leading the Fusilier Battalion of the 24th Regiment was in sight of the Danish positions at Mysunde.

The Danish position at Mysunde was essentially a series of bastions placed around the village. The two most important bastions; referred to as A and B, were placed on either side of the southern road leading into the village. The position was defended by the 6th Fortification battalion led by Captain Hertel, who had at his disposition 20 cannons and about 100 men, as well as the 1st battalion of the 18th Regiment. Bastion A had 4, 24-pound and 4, 12-pound guns, while Bastion B had 4, 24-pound and 2, 12-pound guns. All of the Danish cannon were the old-fashioned muzzle-loading smoothbore variety, while the Prussians wielded more accurate and long-range breech-loading rifled cannon. The 3rd Brigade was bivouacked 11 km north of Mysunde in Reserve.

=== Initial infantry skirmish ===
The Prussian Vanguard was led by the three Fusilier battalions of the 13th, 15th, and 24th Regiment, as well as the 1st Battalion of the 60th Regiment, and the Westphalian Rifle Battalion. The advance encountered a Danish outpost near Langsø at approximately 10:30. After a brief but intense firefight, the Danish troops retreated back towards Mysunde.

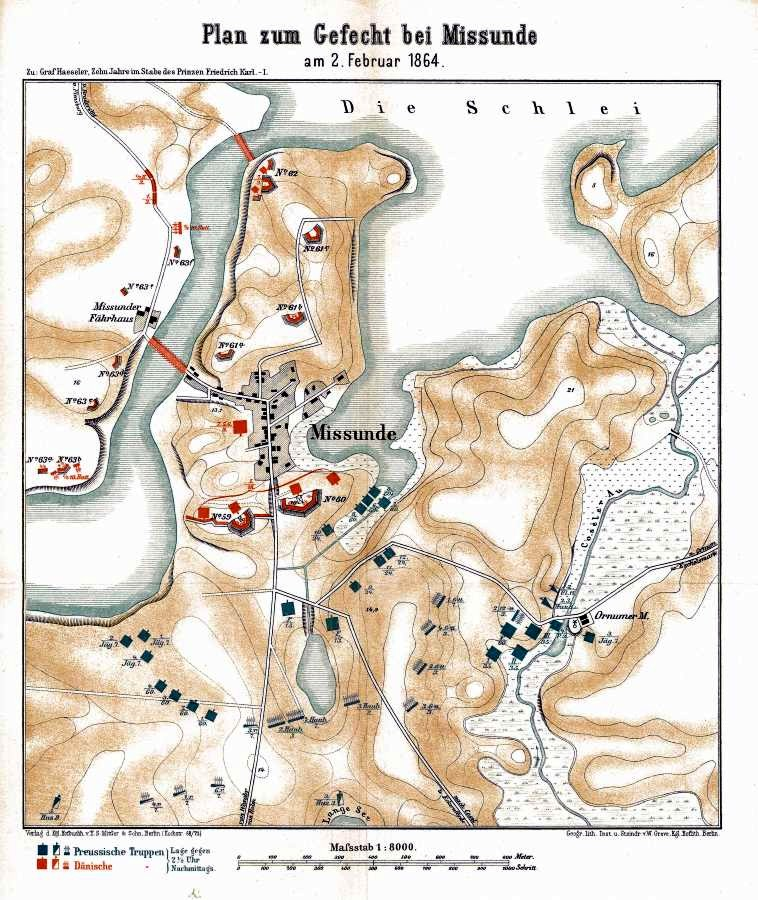
Map of the Battle of Mysunde on 2 February 1864.

A dense fog this morning made it extremely difficult to determine enemy movements, and consequently only a few shots were fired from the Danish guns in the bastions as the Prussians closed in on Mysunde. At 11:30, the 1st Battalion of the 3rd Danish Regiment arrived at Mysunde under the command of Captain Arntz, and along with a squadron of dragoons, the force carried out a reconnaissance in front of the bastions. A thousand paces in front of the bastions, they encountered the fusilier battalions of the 15th and 24th Prussian Regiments and came under intense fire. Lieutenant Hagemann of the 24th Regiment was the first Prussian officer to be killed, but Major v. Krohn led the Fusilier Battalion in a bayonet attack that threw the Danish infantry back. With several officers wounded or killed, Captain Arntz ordered his battalion into position at the bastions. It was only at this point, that the Danish commanders realised that they were facing not just a Prussian reconnaissance force, but an actual assault on the fortifications.

Having successfully thrown back the three Companies of Captain Arntz's battalion, the Prussian Fusiliers continued their advance, occupying on the right flank a fence just a hundred meters from Bastion B and other cover 200 to 250 meters out from the center of the Danish position. A lively exchange of fire played out between the Prussian attackers and the Danish defenders, with scant protection for either side as the trenches were in disrepair. Danish eyewitness accounts from the battle describe having to lie on their belly on the frozen ground while exchanging fire with the Prussians.

=== Artillery duel ===
At around 12:00, the Prussian artillery had begun to arrive in front of Mysunde and it deployed on a ridge in front of the position with a battery of 24 6-pound cannon and 24 howitzers. At 12:45 it opened fire on the bastions, followed shortly after by 16 additional guns from the Reserve artillery. With their numerical superiority, the Prussian command hoped to suppress or drive back the Danish fortification troops by the weight of their fire.

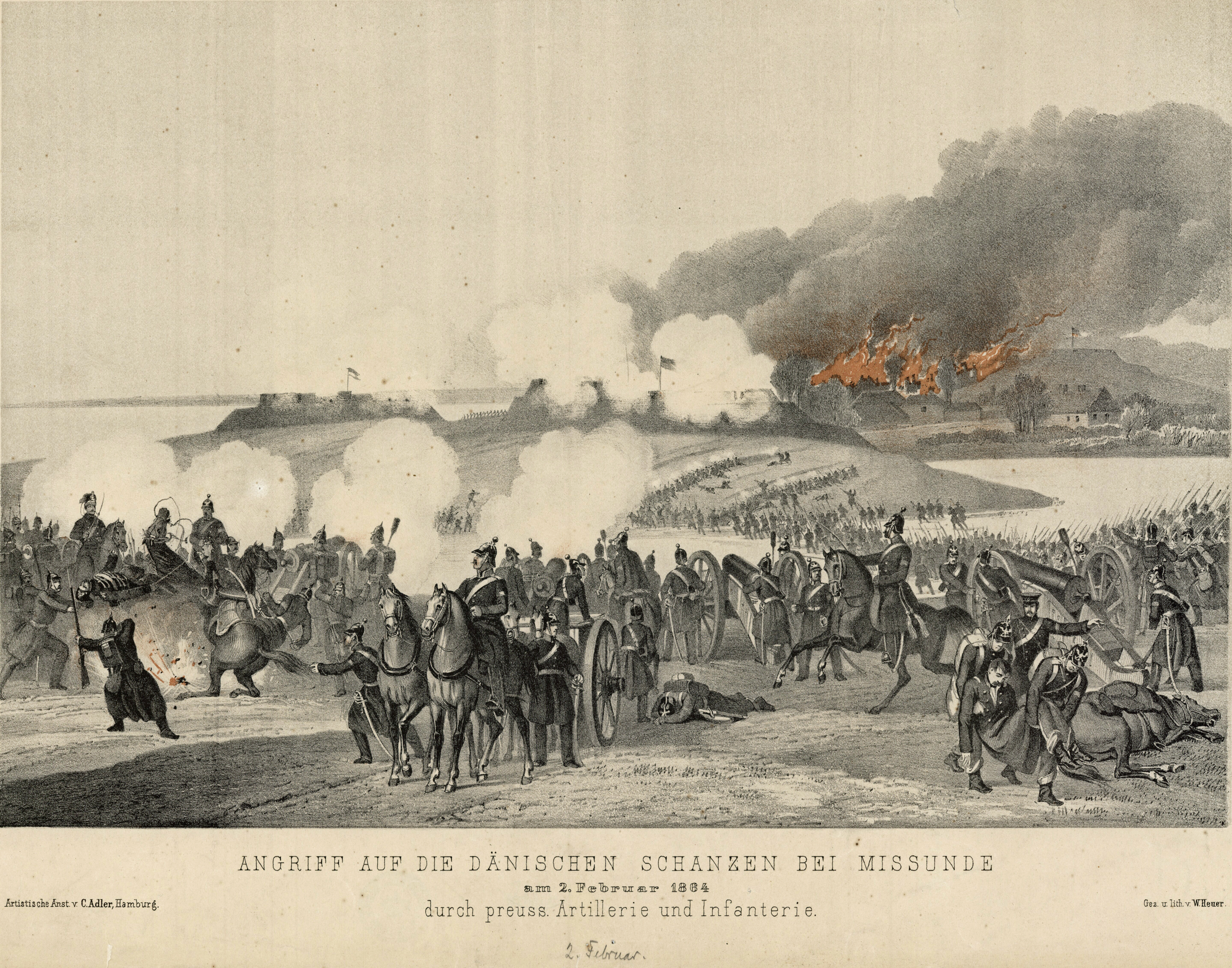
Contemporary illustration, as seen from the Prussian lines. The burning village of Mysunde is seen in the background, the bastions with the Danish defenders are covered in mist on the left side.

An intense artillery duel developed between the 20 Danish cannons in the bastions and the 64 Prussian cannon on the ridges (one Prussian battery reportedly fired more than 300 rounds). However, the fog made identifying and targeting the enemy positions effectively impossible. As the smoke from the cannons mingled with the fog and further obscured the features of the terrain, the artillerymen on both sides were soon reduced to simply aiming at the flashes from the cannon fire of their opponents.

=== The Prussian infantry advance ===
From their positions in the trenches, the Prussian infantry were causing significant casualties among the Danish artillerymen, particularly in the exposed Bastion B. The Danish 3rd Brigade had been ordered to reinforce Mysunde when the artillery opened fire, but they were still too far distant to be of help. Two companies of the 2nd Battalion of 3rd regiment that had been stationed on the coast to the northeast of the village were therefore hurriedly rushed south, while the 10th battery of the Danish army had arrived at noon and had been stationed on the western banks of the Schlei (however, the battery did not play any significant part in the battle).

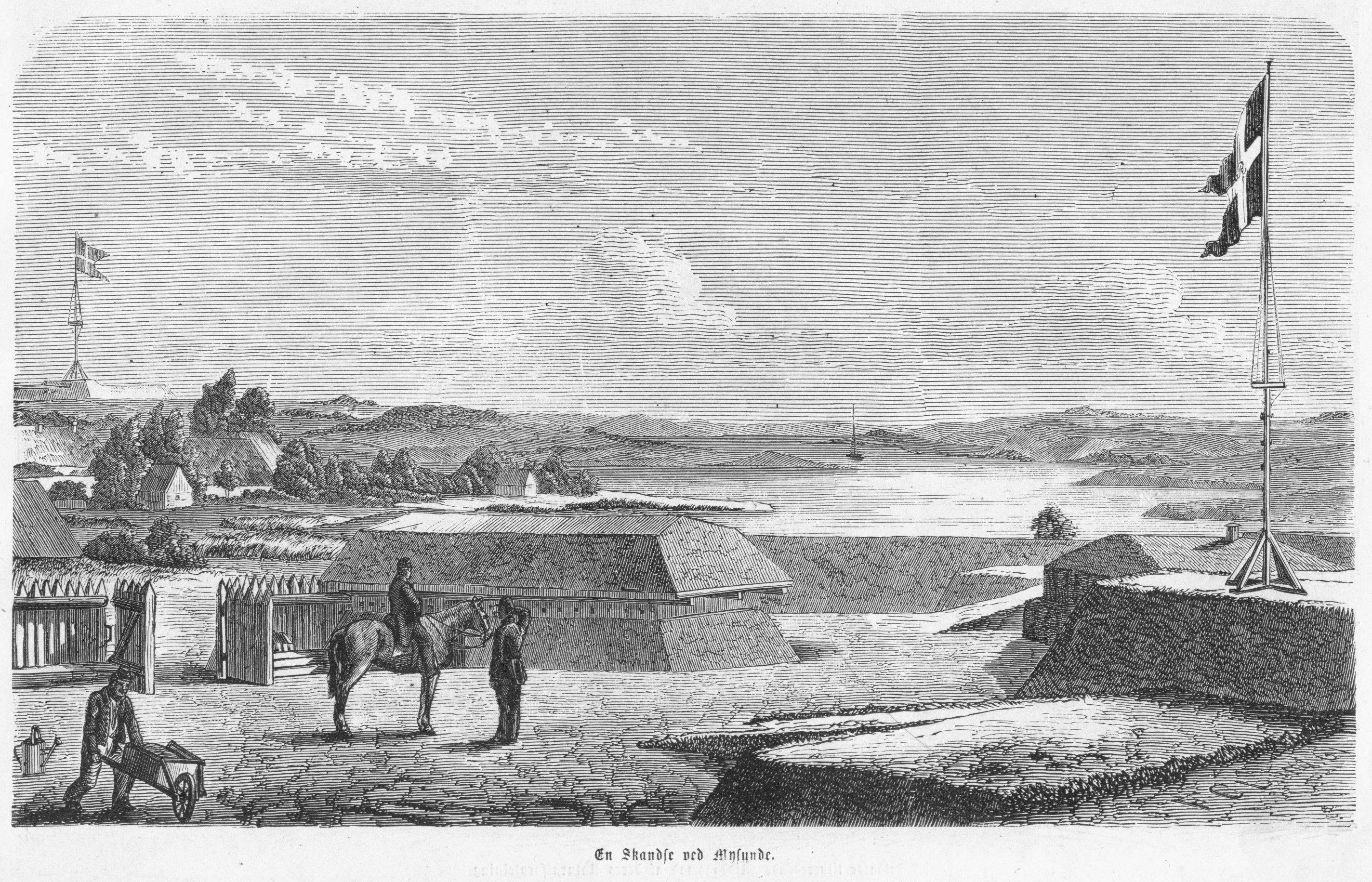
A bastion at Mysunde

To reduce the fire on Bastion B, one company of the 18th Regiment attempted to push back the Prussian Fusiliers taking cover in the fences in front of the bastion, but the assault was repulsed by a withering fire from the Prussian positions.

The Prussian infantry began a methodical advance toward the Danish bastions, while the Prussian howitzers moved forward to a position within 700 meters of the bastions. Three of the Danish cannon in Bastion B were knocked out, but the majority of the Prussian shells went over the Danish positions to hit the village where most of the buildings caught fire. Multiple attempts by the Prussian infantry to form up for an assault and advance across the open terrain in front of the fortifications were met by canister shot and enfilade fire from the Danish bastions, forcing the Prussians to fall back into cover or lie on the ground. In their exposed positions, the Prussian howitzers also suffered heavily. Prussian infantry were able to advance to the coast of the Schlei on the right flank of the Danish positions, but were again repulsed by intense musket fire from the Danish infantry.

A Prussian general assault was expected at any moment. To meet the expected threat, two guns from the west bank were redeployed to cover the central road into Mysunde. The Danish infantry were ordered to prepare for a counterattack with the bayonet, if the Prussians should reach the fortifications.

Instead, the Prussians decided to withdraw. It was apparent that the only way to take Mysunde would be through a frontal assault on the position. While the Prussians had numerical superiority, the inevitably high casualties would have been unacceptable to the Prussian high command in this politically sensitive conflict. At 16:00, the Prussian forces began to pull back.

== Conclusion ==
The Danish army lost 9 officers and 132 enlisted men dead or wounded in the battle while the Prussians lost 12 officers and 187 enlisted men. The majority of the Prussian losses were in the Fusilier Battalion of the 15th Regiment (60 men) and the 2nd Battalion of the 60th Regiment (40 men). A truce was arranged to bury the dead and recover the wounded. The truce allowed the Prussians to extricate a company of around a 100 men who had advanced too far and who were now precariously pinned down too close to the Danish positions. Their escape due to the truce angered the Danish soldiers, although it also amused them to see the Prussians "...running away as fast as they could".

The Prussian army had been repulsed, but the Prince Carl Friedrich attempted to turn the defeat into a positive by emphasizing the difficulty of the terrain and praising the gallantry of his men. The battle was important because it was the first test of the new Prussian army after the reforms of Albrecht Graf von Roon, Edwin von Manteuffel and Helmuth von Moltke. Although defeated, the Prussian infantry and artillery were considered to have performed well during the fighting.

For the Danes, the successful defense of the position prevented the encirclement and entrapment of the Danish army at the Danevirke. The victory boosted the morale of both the troops and the general public, but unfortunately it also strengthened the perception of the Danevirke as an impenetrable defense line. Consequently, the victory here increased the outrage felt by the general public when only four days later General de Meza ordered the Danish army to retreat from the Danevirke. General Gerlach who held command of the 1st Division defending Mysunde reluctantly assumed overall command of the Danish army after the dismissal of De Meza.

== See also ==
- Second Schleswig War
