= Helin family =

German-Swedish family

Helin family (de) Hénin
- Parent family: House of Hénin
- Current region: Belgium; Sweden; Poland
- Origin: Chimay in Hainaut
- Founded: 1679
- Founder: Clemens Johannes Helin I
- Estate: Chimay Castle

The Helin family (English pronunciation: [ˈhɛlɪn]), also known as Helin - Bo in Stockholm, and as von Helin in Mecklenburg-Schwerin was a Swedish family noted as politicians, clergymen, bureaucrats, industrialist.

== Notable members ==
- Clemens Johannes Helin I 1679 –1753
- Clemens Johannes Helin II 1710 – 1775
- Clemens Johannes Helin III 1742 – 1807
- Clemens Johannes Helin IIII 1782 – 1853
- Johan Fridolf Helin 1816 – 1886
