= IMCO =

IMCO may refer to:

- the Intercontinental Manufacturing Company
- the Intermountain Manufacturing Company
- the Julius Meister & Co, Austrian lighter manufacturer
- the Committee on the Internal Market and Consumer Protection of the European Parliament
- the Mexican Institute for Competitiveness or Instituto Mexicano para la Competitividad
- the International Match Corporation, New York, founded 1923. Part of Kreuger & Toll. Bankrupt in 1932.
- the company IMCO Carbide Tool
- the (former) olympic windsurfing class Mistral One Design Class
- the Inter-Governmental Maritime Consultative Organization until 1982, today IMO
- the orthopedic surgical method, Intramedullary Cement Osteosynthesis
