= Ivar Kreuger =

Swedish civil engineer, financier, entrepreneur and industrialist (1880–1932)

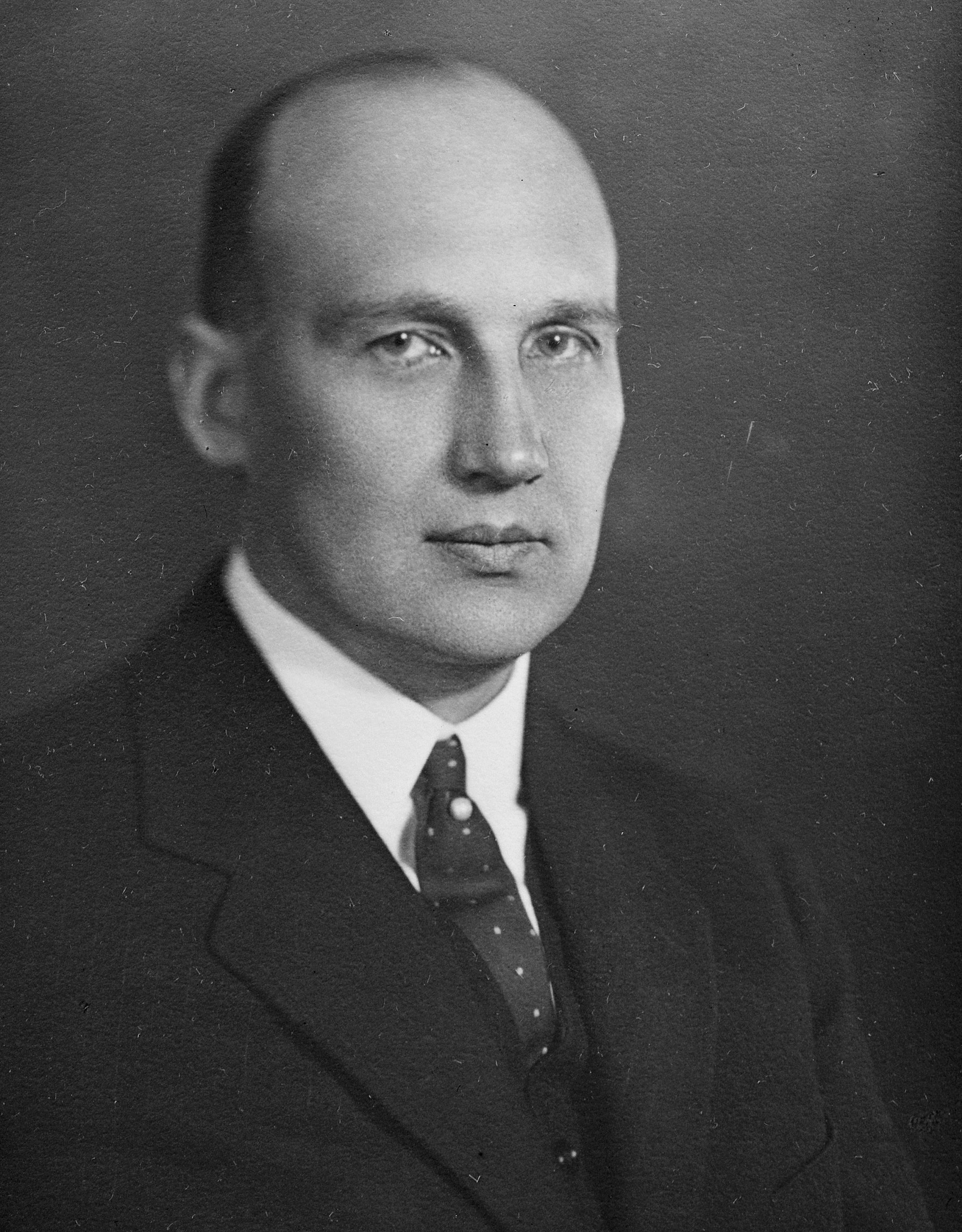
- Kreuger c. 1920
- Born: 2 March 1880; Kalmar, Sweden
- Died: 12 March 1932 (aged 52); Paris, France
- Resting place: Norra begravningsplatsen
- Education: Royal Institute of Technology
- Occupations: Businessman; Industrialist
- Relatives: Torsten Kreuger (brother)

Signature
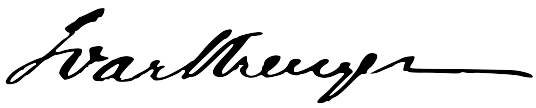

Ivar Kreuger (Swedish: [ˈǐːvar ˈkry̌ːɡɛr]; 2 March 1880 – 12 March 1932) was a Swedish civil engineer, financier, entrepreneur and industrialist. In 1908, he co-founded the construction company Kreuger & Toll Byggnads AB, which specialized in new building techniques. By aggressive investments and innovative financial instruments, he built a global match and financial empire. Between the two world wars, he negotiated match monopolies with European, Central American and South American governments, and finally controlled between two thirds and three quarters of worldwide match production, becoming known as the "Match King".

Kreuger's financial empire has been described by one biographer as a Ponzi scheme, based on the supposedly fantastic profitability of his match monopolies. In a Ponzi scheme, early investors are paid dividends from their own money or that of subsequent investors. Although Kreuger did this to some extent, he also controlled many legitimate and often very profitable businesses. He owned banks, real estate, a gold mine, and pulp industrial companies. He also owned many match companies. Many of them have survived to this day. Kreuger & Toll, for example, was composed of bona fide businesses, and there were others like it. Another biographer called Kreuger a "genius and swindler", and John Kenneth Galbraith wrote that he was the "Leonardo of larcenists". Kreuger's financial empire collapsed during the Great Depression. The Price Waterhouse autopsy of his financial empire stated: "The manipulations were so childish that anyone with but a rudimentary knowledge of bookkeeping could see the books were falsified." In March 1932, he was found dead in the bedroom of his flat in Paris. The police concluded that he had committed suicide, but decades later, his brother Torsten claimed that he had been murdered, which spawned some controversial literature on the subject.

== Early life ==
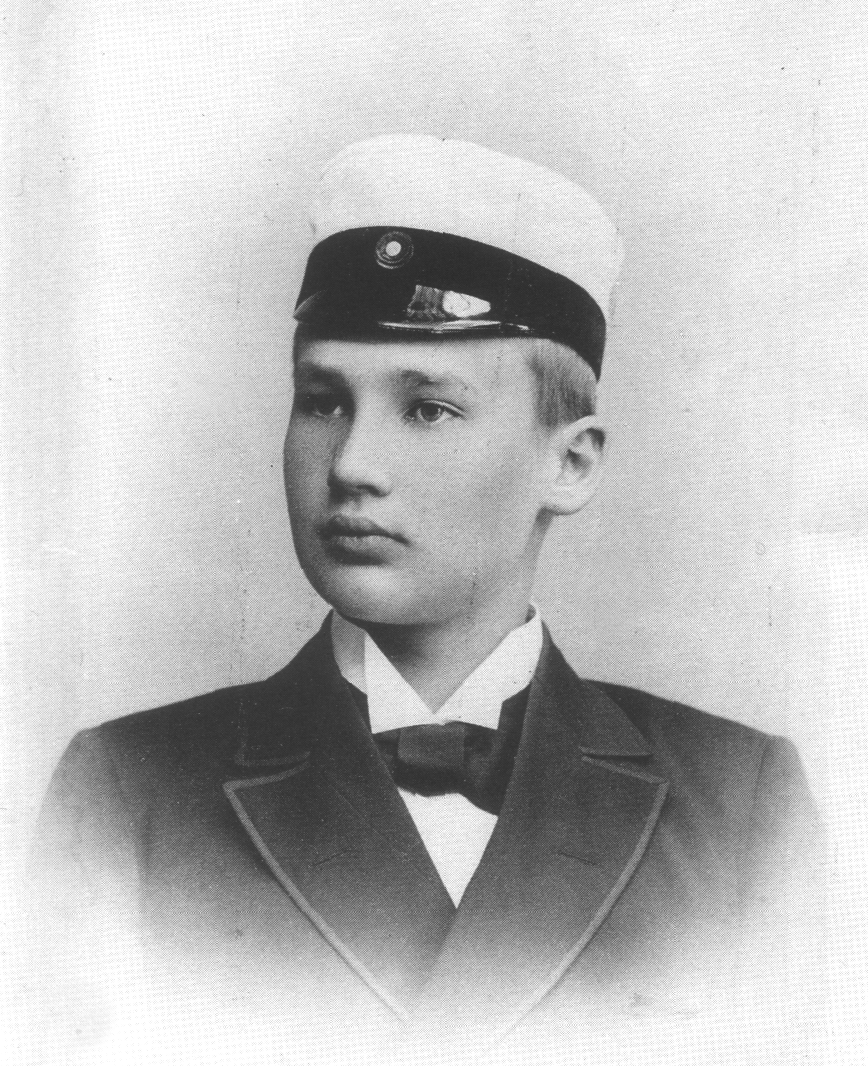
Kreuger as a graduate at the age of 16

Kreuger was born in Kalmar, the eldest son of Ernst August Kreuger, an industrialist in the match industry in that city, and his wife Jenny Emelie Kreuger (née Forssman). He had five siblings.

At school, Ivar skipped ahead two classes by taking private lessons. At age 16, he began studies at the Royal Institute of Technology in Stockholm, from which he graduated with combined master's degrees covering both the faculties of mechanical and civil engineering, at the age of 20.

== Personal life ==
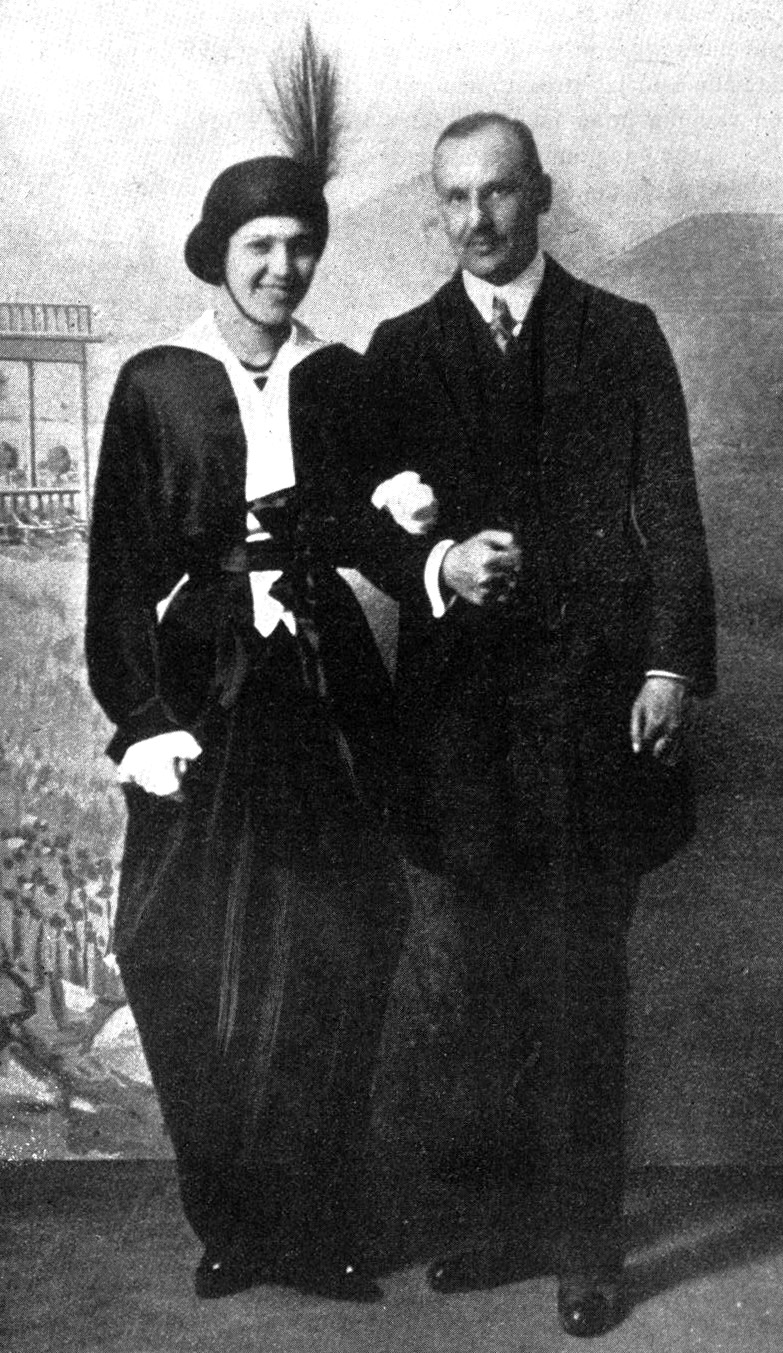
Ingeborg Eberth and Ivar Kreuger. Photo from 1914.

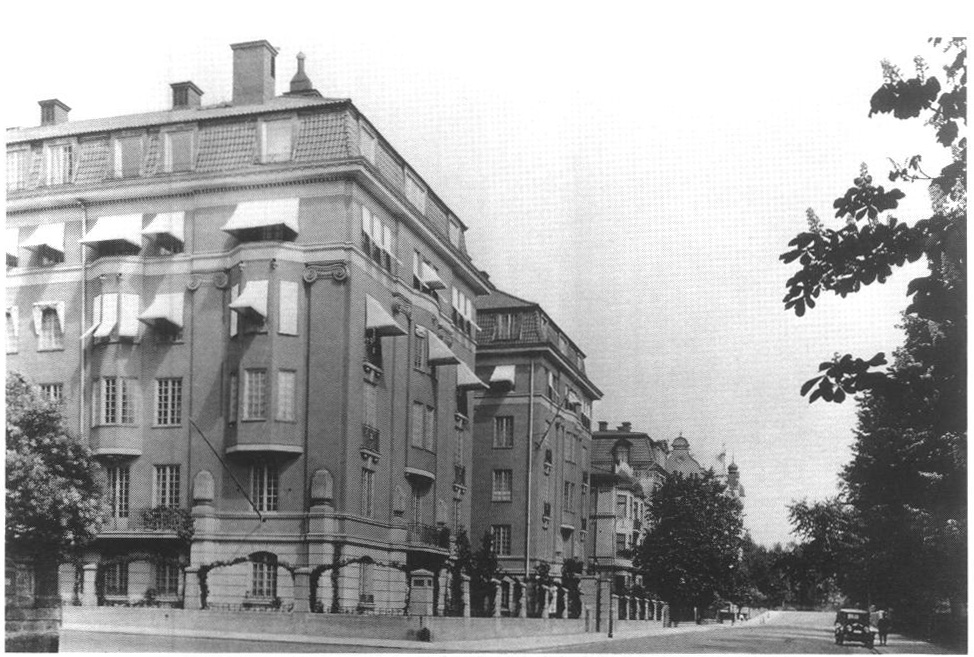
The building with address Villagatan No. 13A & 13B, where Ivar Kreuger had his apartment in Stockholm. Across the street at Villagatan 10, Paul Toll had his residence.

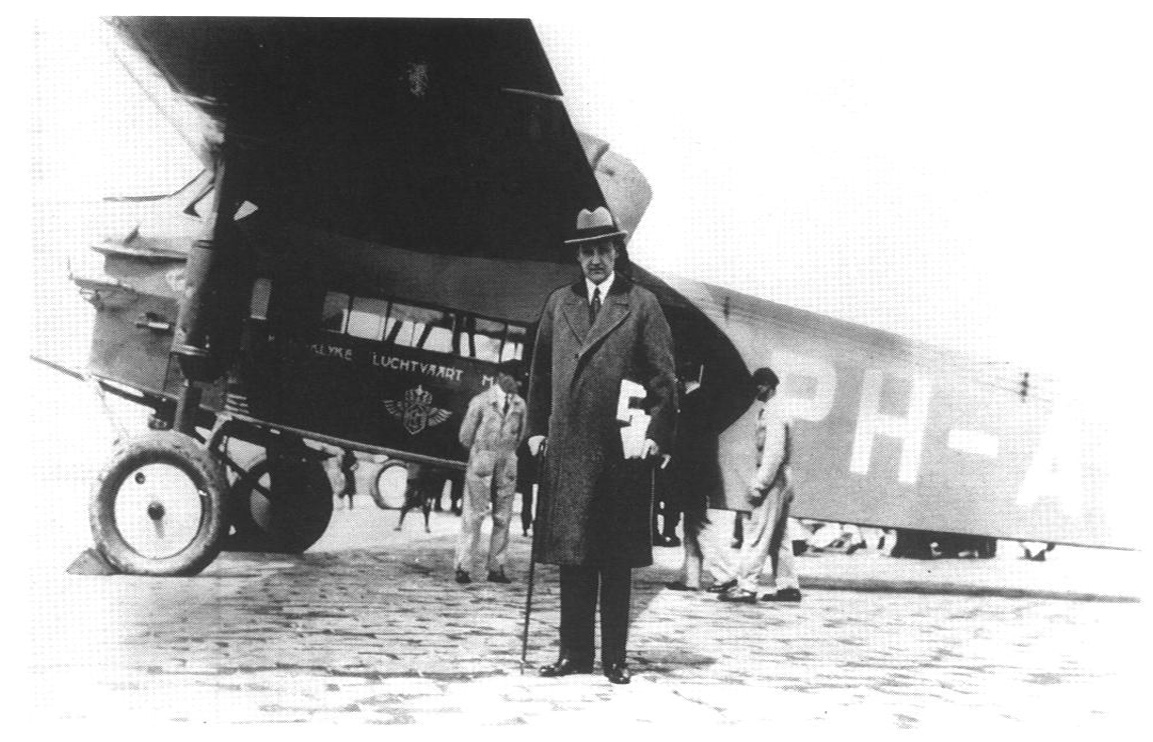
Ivar Kreuger ready for take-off for a business trip in Europe with an early passenger plane

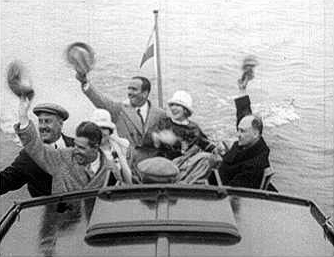
Mary Pickford, Douglas Fairbanks, Charles Magnusson and Ivar Kreuger (to the right) onboard M/Y Loris in Stockholm 1924

Ivar Kreuger never married, but lived for many years in different periods with Ingeborg Eberth (née Hässler), a physical therapist from Stockholm, who first met him there in 1913. According to the book she wrote after Kreuger's death in 1932, he was not interested in marriage or children and was very much focused on his business. She broke off their relationship in 1917 and moved to Denmark, where she married a Danish engineer named Eberth. They had a daughter in 1919, Grete Eberth (later to be an actress in Stockholm, married name Mac Laury). After some years she divorced Eberth and moved back to Stockholm with her daughter, reuniting with Kreuger. Mr. Eberth once kidnapped the daughter in Stockholm and brought her back to Denmark. Shortly thereafter Ingeborg, without notifying the authorities or police, went down to Denmark and brought the daughter back to Sweden by hiring a private fishing boat in Denmark that took them over Öresund to Sweden. The new period with Kreuger lasted until around 1928; after that they just met occasionally. The last time they met was in November 1931, just before Kreuger started on his final trip to America. Eberth received the news about his death in Paris on 12 March 1932, from newspaper headlines the day after.

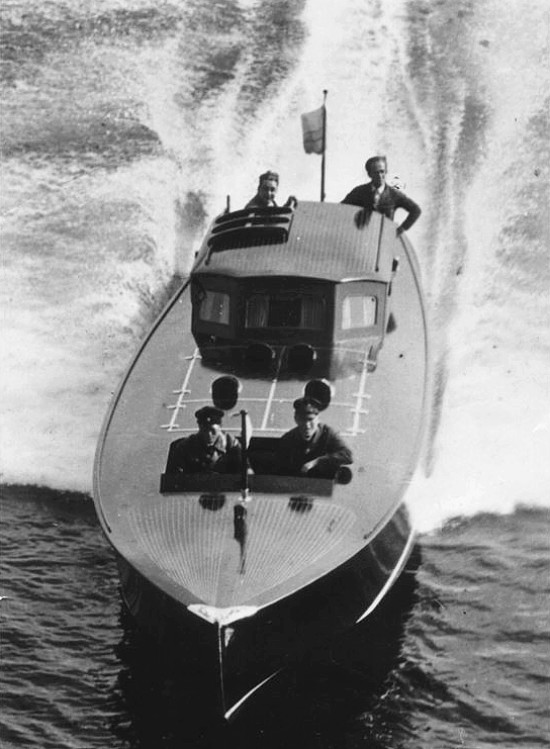
Ivar Kreugers Svalan boat, 1930

Kreuger had private apartments in Stockholm, New York, Paris, and Warsaw, and a country place used during the summer season on the private island Ängsholmen in the archipelago of Stockholm. On business tours in Europe, he preferred to meet his business associates in Paris and then stayed in his flat at 5, Av. Victor Emanuel III (today named Avenue Franklin-D.-Roosevelt). He owned several specially designed motor yachts, among them Elsa built in 1906, Loris (1913), Tärnan (1925), and the most famous, Svalan (Swallow), built at Lidingö in 1928, a 37 ft, 4.9 ton motor yacht, equipped with a V12, 31.9 liter Hispano-Suiza engine from the US company Wright, with 650 HP output, capable of more than 50 knots (≈ 57 mph). A replica of the boat has been built.

He had a large private library in both his apartments in Stockholm and New York and quite a large art collection. The paintings were sold at different auctions held in September 1932, as all of Kreuger's private assets were incorporated into the bankruptcy. The collection in Stockholm comprised 88 original paintings, among them 19 by Anders Zorn and a great number of Dutch masters. The New York collection included paintings by Rembrandt and Anthony van Dyck.

Kreuger became the major shareholder when the Swedish film company AB Svensk Filmindustri (SF) was founded in 1919 and because of that, sometimes met celebrities from the film industry. In June 1924, Mary Pickford and Douglas Fairbanks were invited by SF to Stockholm and were guided around the Stockholm archipelago in Kreuger's motor yacht Loris. A five-minute film sequence of this occasion is stored in SF's film archive. Pickford, Fairbanks, Kreuger, Charles Magnusson (the manager for SF), Greta Garbo and various SF employees appear in the film.

== Early years in the United States ==
After the start of the 20th century, Kreuger spent seven years traveling and working abroad as an engineer in the US, Mexico, South Africa and other countries, but spent most of the time in the US. In South Africa, he ran a restaurant for a short time together with his friend Anders Jordahl, but they soon sold the restaurant. At an early stage, he came in contact with the patented Kahn System for concrete-steel constructions that was exploited by Julius Kahn's Trussed Concrete Steel Company, when working for different engineering companies, among them The Consolidated Engineering & Construction Co. and Purdy & Henderson in New York. This new technique had not been introduced in Sweden at that time. In 1907, he managed to get the representative rights for the system for both the Swedish and the German markets, and at the end of 1907, he returned to Sweden with the goal of introducing the new methods in both countries at the same time. At that time, one of the experts in Sweden in concrete-steel constructions was his cousin Henrik Kreüger working at KTH in Stockholm.

== The building contractor and his innovations ==
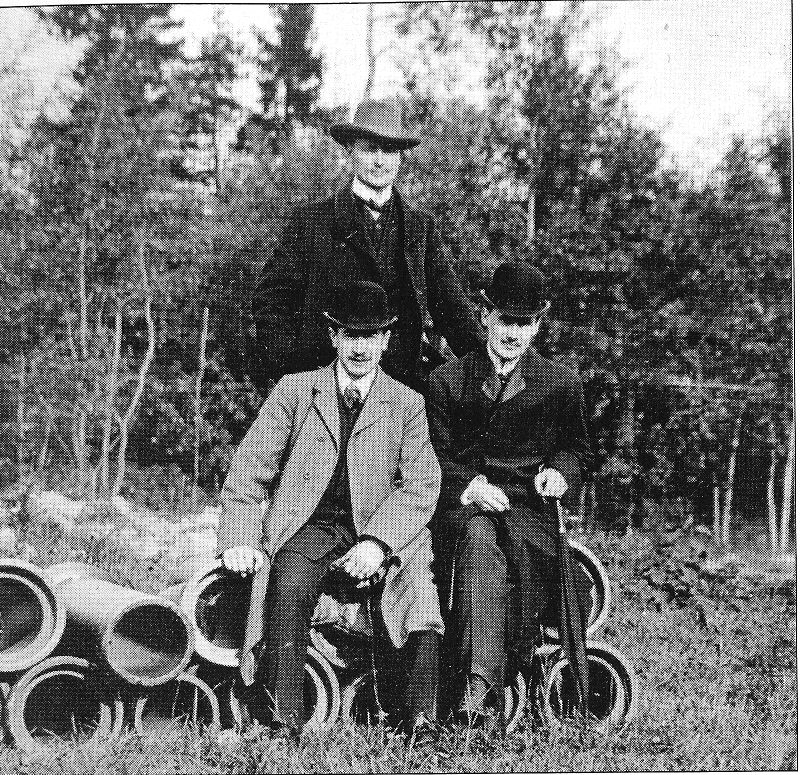
Kreuger & Toll founders Paul Toll (standing), Henrik Kreüger (left) and Ivar Kreuger during an inspection of an overpass in Solna in 1908, one of the first orders for the construction company

In May 1908, Kreuger formed the construction firm Kreuger & Toll in Sweden with the engineer Paul Toll, at that time working for the construction company Kasper Höglund AB, and his cousin Henrik Kreüger, working at the faculty of civil engineering at KTH, as a consulting engineer for the company. In Germany, he formed the company Deutsche Kahneisengesellschaft together with a colleague from his time in America, Anders Jordahl.

The concrete-steel construction method of constructing buildings was not fully accepted in Sweden at that time and in order to market the new technique, Kreuger held several lectures and wrote an illustrated article on the subject in a leading engineering magazine, Teknisk Tidskrift. The new technology was a success and the firm won several prestigious contracts, such as the construction of the Stockholm Olympic Stadium (1911–12); the foundation work for the new Stockholm City Hall (1912–13) and the department store NK (1913–14) in Stockholm. The chief engineer behind these advanced projects was Henrik Kreüger.

Innovation in the construction business also included a definite commitment to finish the building on time. Hitherto the financial risk of delays were assumed by the clients. Kreuger & Toll was the first firm in Europe to commit to finish projects by a fixed date, thus shifting the risk to the builder, who after all was in the best position to reduce delays. When Kreuger won the contract to build a six-story "skyscraper", he promised that if construction wasn't finished by a particular date Kreuger & Toll would give the client a partial refund of $1,200 (about $18,000 in today's currency) for each late day. It is noteworthy that Kreuger & Toll's entire capital would have covered just two days of being late. The client, in turn, agreed to pay a bonus for every day the building was finished before the due date. Kreuger & Toll finished early and subsequently earned completion bonuses for every project. Within a few years, Kreuger & Toll was seen as the best building company in Sweden and one of the top firms in all of Europe.

Within six years after its incorporation, Kreuger & Toll earned annual profits of around $200,000 and was paying a substantial dividend of 15%. In 1917, the company was split into two separate companies: Kreuger & Toll Construction AB, with the majority of shares owned by Paul Toll, and Kreuger & Toll Holding. Ivar Kreuger was not among the board members in the construction company. How much of Paul Toll's company Ivar Kreuger owned has not been revealed—just that Paul Toll owned 60% in 1917 and, around 1930, 66% of the construction company. Kreuger & Toll Construction Co. has never shown up in any Kreuger & Toll Holding organisation charts.

Kreuger & Toll Holding became his financial holding company, with Ivar Kreuger as the general manager and major share holder. He controlled it with a tight grip. The board of directors consisted of Ivar, his father, Paul Toll and two very close colleagues.

After Ivar got involved in his father's match factories in Kalmar, he became more focused on "constructing" new companies or taking control of other corporations – usually paying with his own securities instead of cash – rather than buildings and bridges. Thus, by 1927, Ivar had bought banks, mining companies, railways, timber and paper firms, film distributors, real estate in several European cities as well as a controlling stake in L.M. Ericsson & Co., Sweden's leading phone company. He controlled about 50% of the world market in iron ore and cellulose. He owned mines all over the world including the Boliden mine in Sweden, which had one of the richest gold deposits outside South Africa in addition to other minerals.

Kreuger formed Swedish Match by merging his father's business with other match factories he had quietly bought during World War I. Its initial capital was around $10 million ($180 million in 2025 dollars) and Ivar owned about half of it, held all senior positions and controlled the board of directors.

The Swedish banker Oscar Rydbeck sv became a close associate and an important teacher for Ivar in the financing business. He worked for Kreuger & Toll as a consultant from around 1912 until the Kreuger Crash in 1932 and was a member of its board of directors. For not having carried out his duties as a director he went to jail for 10 months after Ivar's death.

== Match business ==
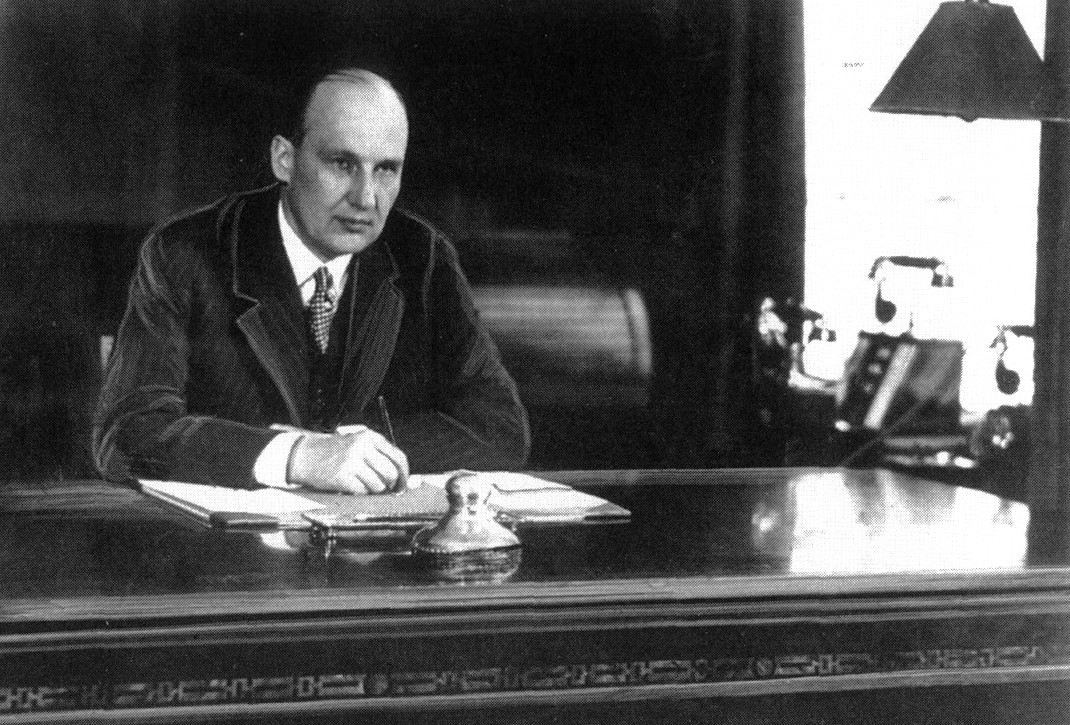
Ivar Kreuger in the headquarters of Swedish Match, the Matchstick Palace, in Stockholm around 1930

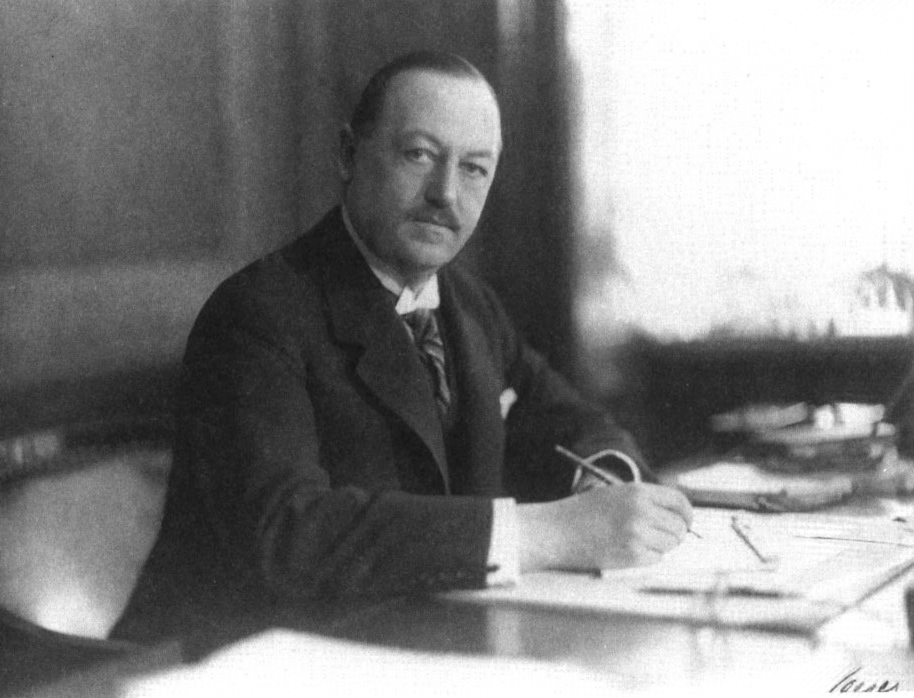
Oscar Rydbeck, Ivar Kreuger's banker. Photo: around 1930.

In 1911 and 1912, the Kreuger family match factories in Kalmar, Fredriksdal and Mönsterås, run by his father Ernst Kreuger, uncle Fredrik Kreuger and his brother Torsten Kreuger, encountered financial problems. Kreuger was then advised by his banker Oscar Rydbeck to turn the factories into a stock corporation in order to raise more capital. This was the starting point for the reformation of the Swedish match industry as well as the major match companies in Norway and Finland. The goal was to get control of the entire match industry in Scandinavia.

With the family match factories as the base, Kreuger first founded the Swedish corporation AB Kalmar-Mönsterås Tändsticksfabrik in 1912. His father, Ernst, and uncle Fredrik, became the major shareholders and his brother Torsten was appointed the general manager. Ivar became a member of the board.

A merger between this company with several other small match companies in Sweden, the company AB Svenska Förenade Tändsticksfabriker was founded in 1913 with Ivar Kreuger as the general manager. Later, by merging with the largest match company in Sweden, AB Jönköping-Vulcan, Svenska Tändsticks AB (Swedish Match) was founded in 1917. Ivar had originally tried to convince AB Jönköping-Vulcan to merge in December 1912, but they had not been interested as Vulcan was the dominating match company in Sweden. Ivar then started to acquire all of the match companies as well as most of the raw material companies he could find in and around Sweden and then finally got AB Jönköping-Vulcan to accept the merger. He had been so persuasive in arguing for the merger that he managed to overvalue his side of the deal so that it was essentially the smaller organization taking over the larger one. It was his first big venture in inflating values, which became his prime tactic thereafter.

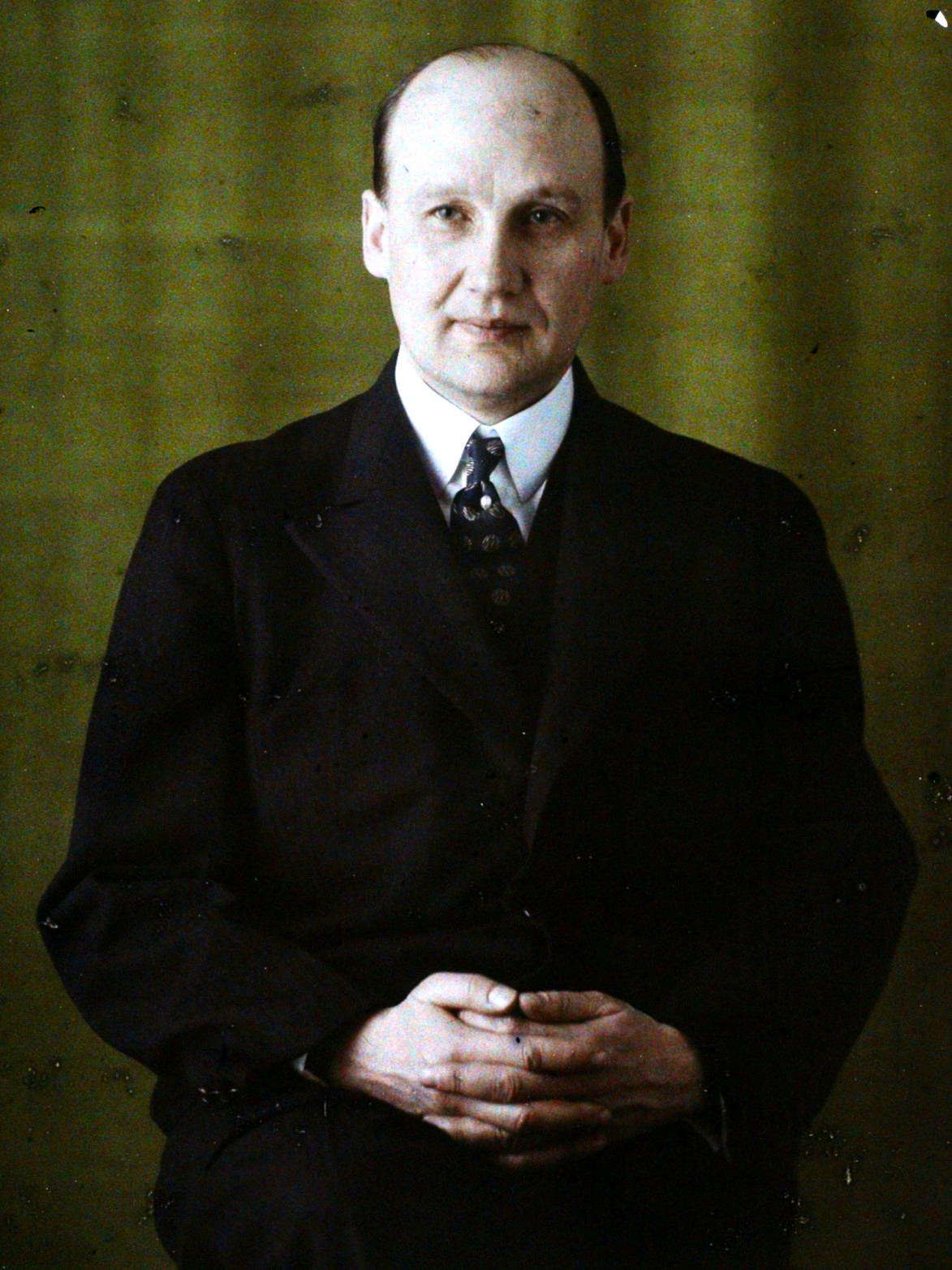
1930 Autochrome by Georges Chevalier

One of the main designers behind this operation, besides Ivar, was his banker Rydbeck. The total number of shares in the new company was 450,000. Ivar Kreuger personally owned 223,000 shares and his new holding company, Kreuger & Toll Holding AB, 60,000.

This company group now covered the entire match industry in Sweden, including all the major companies that manufactured the production machines used in the factories. The total number of employees working in match production in Sweden in 1917 was around 9000. It also had control over major companies supplying the raw material for the match industry. During this time Kreuger also acquired the largest match manufacturing companies in Norway (Bryn and Halden) and in Finland (Wiborgs and Kekkola).

However, Kreuger not only "acquired" companies but also introduced a new way of thinking in the Swedish match industry with large scale production facilities as well as ideas to increase efficiency in production, administration, distribution, and marketing.

He managed to unite the Swedish match industry as well as the major match companies in Norway and Finland. With this new company structure the match industry in Scandinavia became a major competitor to large manufacturers elsewhere. Ivar's methods resembled those John D. Rockefeller used in the formation of the Standard Oil Trust transforming dozens of struggling factories into a strong and profitable monopoly. The methods had become illegal in the USA because of anti-trust laws, but were not against the law in Sweden at the time.

A German chemist had invented phosphorus matches in 1832 but they were dangerous because the yellow phosphorus used was poisonous and because it was in the match head and thus could easily light by accident. The Swedes improved on the design by using a safer red phosphorus, which they put on the striking surface of the matchbox. They called them "safety matches". They made Sweden the leading exporter of matches and made matches the most important Swedish export.

It should be remembered that in the early part of the 20th century matches were a necessity for smoking and the lighting of stoves and gas appliances among other uses, and therefore demand for them was highly inelastic, meaning that a monopolist could raise prices (and hence profits) significantly without much affecting the quantity sold.

By expanding the Swedish Match company through acquisition of government-created monopolies, the Swedish company became the world's largest match manufacturer. Kreuger set up an affiliate to Kreuger & Toll AB in the United States, and together with Lee, Higginson & Co. in New York, formed the International Match Corporation. This group eventually came to control almost 75% of the world production in matches.

== Other business ==
From 1925 to 1930, years when many countries in Europe were suffering after the First World War, Kreuger's companies gave loans to governments to speed up reconstruction. As a security, the governments would grant him the match monopoly in their country. This means that Kreuger gained a monopoly in match production, sales, or distribution, or a complete monopoly. The monopoly agreements differed from country to country. The capital was raised to a large extent through loans from Swedish and American banks, combined with issuing a large amount of participating debentures. Kreuger also often moved money from one corporation he controlled to another.

Kreuger did not limit himself to matches, but gained control of most of the forestry industry in northern Sweden and planned to become head of a cellulose cartel. He also attempted to create a telephone monopoly in Sweden.

After founding the pulp manufacturer SCA, in 1929 Kreuger was able to acquire the majority shares in the telephone company Ericsson; the mining company Boliden (gold); major interests in the ball bearing manufacturer SKF; the bank Skandinaviska Kreditaktiebolaget and others.

Abroad he acquired Deutsche Unionsbank in Germany and Union de Banques à Paris in France, often with the acquired company's own money. These maneuvers were made both necessary and possible by his invention, decades ahead of his time, of Enron-style financial engineering, which reported profits when there were none and paid out ever increasing dividends by attracting new investment and/or looting the treasury of a newly acquired company.

By 1931, Kreuger controlled some 200 companies. However, the Stock Market Crash of 1929 turned out to be a major factor in exposing his accounting that ultimately proved fatal to both him and his empire.

In the spring of 1930, he visited the United States and gave a lecture about the situation in world economics at the Industrial Club of Chicago with the title "The transfer problem and its importance to the United States". He was invited by President Hoover to the White House to discuss the subject and in June he was awarded the title Doctor of Business Administration by Syracuse University, where he had worked as a young chief engineer when Archbold Stadium was built there in 1907.

In 1929, at the peak of his career, the Kreuger fortune was thought to be worth 30 billion Swedish kronor, equivalent to approximately US$100 billion in 2000, and consisting of more than 200 companies. In the same year, the total loans made by Swedish banks were barely 4 billion SEK.

== Financial innovations and financial engineering ==
Obtaining a monopoly for the production and/or sale of matches in return for loans to governments was, in its essence, not a new way of doing business. Such schemes had been around for a long time (e.g. the Mississippi Bubble of John Law, and the South Sea Bubble) but Kreuger was very creative inventing new ways of financing business, while making sure that he kept control of his companies.

=== B-shares ===
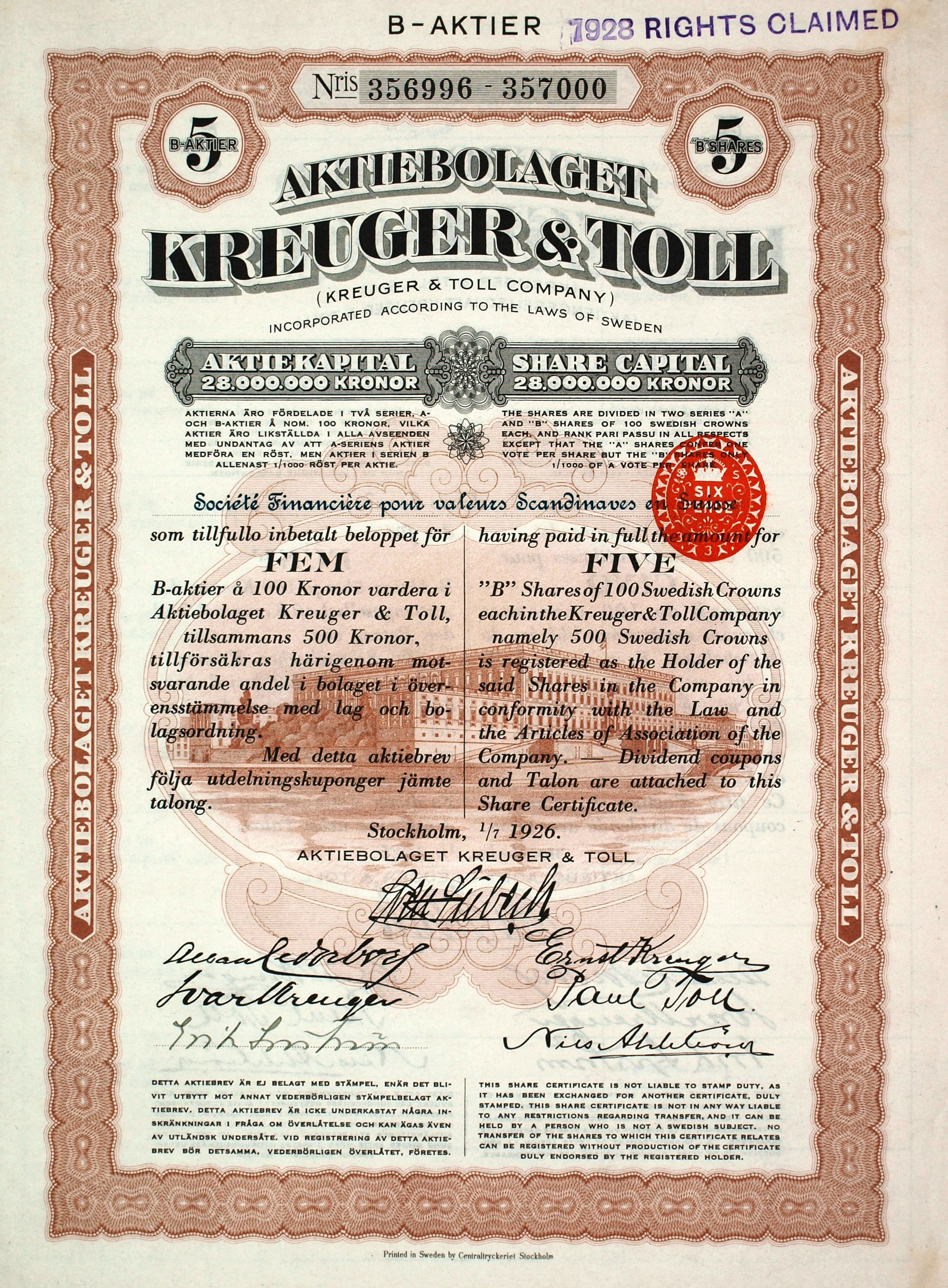
B-share of the AB Kreuger & Toll, issued 1 July 1926

Kreuger financed his activities by selling shares and bonds of his companies as well as through large bank loans, mainly the last two. The use of debt in addition to equity is called leverage and it magnifies both gains and losses.

With respect to selling shares, he invented dual class ownership shares since he did not want to lose control of his companies. He called the class of shares with reduced voting power B shares. One of Kreuger's biographers, Frank Partnoy, called it "an ingenious piece of financial engineering". Ivar began with Swedish Match where he divided the common shares into two classes. Each class would have the same claim to dividends and profits, but the B shares would carry only 1/1000 of a vote, compared to one vote for each A share. In this way Ivar could double the size of his capital, while diluting his control by just a fraction of a percent.

Presently such shares are sometimes called A Shares with the B Shares having more voting power, as is the case with Google for instance where they carry ten times more voting power than the A Shares.

As already stated, these types of shares are used to this day although, unlike in Kreuger's time, there are often restrictions in some markets and/or jurisdictions nowadays. The New York Stock Exchange, for example, allows companies to list dual-class voting shares. Once shares are listed, however, companies are not allowed to reduce the voting rights of the existing shares or issue a new class of superior voting shares.

There is a wide range of dual-class share structures and their use between countries. In Canada, for example, an estimated 20% to 25% of companies currently listed on the TSX make use of some form of dual-class share structure or special voting rights. In the United States on the other hand, where rules on dual-class shares are much more restrictive and investor opposition is more vocal, just over 2% of companies issue restricted shares.

=== Convertible gold debentures ===
Ivar and Lee Higginson & Co., his investment banker in the US, decided to have International Match issue new securities called convertible gold debentures. "Debenture" is a debt instrument not secured by physical collateral or assets. They were issued to mature in 20 years and they were payable in either dollars or gold, at the holder's option. These bonds gave investors the right to receive annual interest payments of 6.5 percent from International Match, which was an attractive rate at the time.

Finally, these debentures were convertible, which meant that they could be converted into shares. If International Match performed well and the value of the shares increased, investors could switch from the debentures to the more valuable shares. The convertible feature made these securities particularly attractive: they have both downside protection (because in the case of bankruptcy the bond holders were paid before the shareholders) and upside potential. In other words, the best of both worlds. "Ivar and Lee Higginson had designed their first financial mousetrap."

Ivar's popularity helped Lee Higginson sell $15 million of International Match gold debentures, at a price of $94.50 for each $100 of principal amount. Investors paid $94.50 in return for the right to receive interest of $6.50 per year for 20 years (6.5 percent of the hundred dollars principal amount.). The deal raised a total of $14,175,000, i.e. 94.5 percent of $15 million.

=== American Certificates ===
Kreuger invented another financial instrument, which continues to be used and is nowadays known as American depositary receipts. That issue was called Kreuger & Toll "American Certificates". American investors had never seen an investment like this. It was part bond, part preferred stock, and part profit sharing option. The certificates enabled investors to gain exposure to a foreign company that had been paying dividends of 25 percent. It would be backed by the largest private loan to a foreign government (i.e. Germany) ever. Even in the midst of the growing panic investors went crazy for the issue and promised to buy 28 million dollars of the new securities. And this happened two days after Black Monday in 1929.

=== Binary foreign exchange option ===
The second Poland agreement also contained some extraordinary protection for International Match including a binary foreign exchange option, a kind of derivative contract, to protect International Match from any declines in the value of the dollar: "International Match Corporation shall have the right to obtain payment of interest in Dutch guilders or US dollars according to its choice and for all such payments one dollar shall be counted as 2½ guilders."

To retain control of Garanta, a company established to facilitate his deals, Ivar created another innovative financial provision, which meant that during the first four years until 1 October 1929, International Match Corporation had the right to appoint the managing director of Garanta who alone was entitled to sign for the company. On or after 1 October 1929, International Match Corporation had the right to acquire 60 percent of the shares at par. This option term secured both initial control over Garanta and the right to own a majority of Garanta's shares in the future.

=== Off balance sheet entities ===
This term means that details of an enterprise do not appear in the parent company's financial statements. Some of these entities were more or less secret. The associated debt, called "off balance sheet obligations", didn't appear in any financial statements of the companies Ivar controlled other than in summary form, if at all. Albert D. Berning of the firm Ernst & Ernst, International Match's auditor, rationalized it at the shareholder's meeting in 1926. He said "it is only customary to consolidate the assets and liabilities of companies in such a balance sheet when a substantial majority of the outstanding shares are owned by the parent company. Where less than such a majority is owned, the shares are included as investments." This invention gained rapid acceptance by others, e.g. Goldman Sachs and Lehman Brothers. The former issued 250 million dollars' worth of complex securities (equivalent to about $4.7 billion in 2025 dollars) in 1929. Lehman issued similar obligations, which immediately rose 30 percent. Enron used them extensively and in the 2008 financial crisis they played a major role in bringing down Bear Stearns and Lehman Brothers.

== Gambling ==
Despite the large number of bona fide companies Kreuger controlled, he was an avid gambler.

He speculated with his personal funds and, especially, with the money of the corporations he controlled. Kreuger treated most of his companies as if they were exclusively his personal property. He frequently transferred funds from one corporation to another with little formality. A number of dummy corporations and holding companies (e.g. Garanta and Continental Investment Corporation) helped him to hide what he was doing. He also used other people as front men to conceal his actions, for example when he acquired almost half of the outstanding shares of Diamond Match Company so as not to raise anti-trust concerns in the US. Towards the end, in 1932, when he frantically gambled with the securities of corporations he controlled in the vain attempt to reverse their falling prices, he played the markets himself and had friends help him in the effort to prop up share prices. Between the end of February and early March 1932 he needed to make over $10 million ($240 million in 2025 dollars) for payments, including Kreuger & Toll dividends.

His speculations were in foreign currencies, equities and derivatives and he also signed loan agreements with governments not knowing where the funds would be coming from. For example, the majority stake he had bought in a chemical company in Griesheim, Germany, returned 15 times his investment after two years when the company became part of I. G. Farben. Part of his attraction for investors were the high dividends Kreuger & Toll paid. Therefore, he also had to make sure that he had the money to pay those dividends.

It has never been established how much Kreuger lost in these frantic efforts in early 1932, but it has been estimated to be between $50 million and $100 million (c$. 1.8 billion and $2.4 billion in 2025 dollars).

His first sovereign loan went to Poland, and when Kreuger signed the agreement he had no idea where the funds would come from.

He made a deal with Germany for a $125 million-dollar loan ($2.4 billion in 2025 dollars) with the conditions that Germany sign the Young Plan and, of course, award him a match monopoly. (He already controlled 70% of German match production before the loan agreement.) When he signed the contract, again he had no idea where he would obtain the huge amount; however, he was lucky. Prime Minister Aristide Briand of France decided to repay a previous $75 million-dollar loan from Ivar before it was due. Incredibly, the French agreed to pay this sum by April 1930, just before Ivar's first payment to Germany was due. That payment gave Ivar enough cash to make his first installment. Either he had negotiated a sweetheart rescue deal with Prime Minister Briand, or he was incredibly lucky. He also made $5M (c$. 96 million in 2025 dollars) due to the way the loan to France was structured. (It had been discounted and although France received only $70 million it was obligated to pay back $75 million.)

== Companies controlled by Kreuger, c. 1930 ==
Kreuger controlled around 400 companies, therefore the following list is highly selective.

- Kreuger & Toll AB. Holding company for most corporations Kreuger controlled. (Notable exceptions include Diamond Match Company, of which he owned almost half the outstanding shares, Ohio Match Company and I.G. Farben.)
- Svenska Tändsticks Aktiebolaget-STAB
- International Match Corporation, US. Holding company for countries outside Europe. Founded in 1923.
- Diamond Match, US
- Ohio Match, US
- Stora Kopparbergs Bergslags AB
- Svenska kullagerfabriken (Ball bearing company)
- LKAB (Mining company)
- Bolidens Gruv AB (Mining company, mainly gold.)
- Hufvudstaden AB (Real estate company. Main interests in Stockholm City. Founded by Ivar Kreuger 1915.)
- Telefon AB L.M. Ericsson
- SCA (Cellulose industry.)
- Högbroforsens Industri AB (Cellulose industry.)
- Sirus A/G
- Szikra Ungar. Zundholzfabriken
- Alsing Trading Co, England
- SF (Movie industry.)
- Skandinaviska Kreditaktiebolaget
- Stockholms Inteckningsgaranti AB
- Trafik AB Grängesberg-Oxelösund (Railroad company.)
- Deutsche Bank
- Union de Banques à Paris
- Banque de Suède et de Paris
- Hollandsche Koopmansbank
- Aktienbauverein Passage
- AG für Hausbesitz
- Bank Amerykański w Polsce, Poland

== Kreuger group loans to foreign states, 1925–1930 ==
The total loans by Kreuger to foreign states have been estimated to US$387m in 1930, corresponding to about US$7.1 – 10.4 bn in 2013 currency.

- Poland I, 1925: $6m and Poland II, 1930: $32.4m
- Free State Danzig, 1930: $1m
- Greece I, 1926: £1m and Greece II, 1931: £1m
- Ecuador I, 1927: $2m and Ecuador II, 1929: $1m
- France, 1927: $75m
- Yugoslavia, 1928: $22m
- Kingdom of Hungary, 1928: $36m
- Germany, 1929: $125m
- Latvia, 1928: $6m
- Romania, 1930: $30m
- Lithuania, 1930: $6m
- Bolivia, 1930: $2 m
- Estonia, 1928: SEK 7.6m
- Guatemala, 1930; $2.5m
- Turkey, 1930: $10m
- Part of the "Young-loan" to Germany, 1930: US$15m

Kreuger planned to issue a loan of $75m to Italy, known as the "Italian Bond" in 1930 but the deal was never completed.

== End of the Kreuger empire and death ==
In March 1931, during a meeting at the German Ministry of Finance in Berlin, Swiss banker Felix Somary already warned of a bankruptcy of Kreuger's match company. By mid-1931, rumours spread that Kreuger & Toll and other companies in Kreuger's empire were financially unstable. In February 1932, Kreuger turned to Sveriges Riksbank for the second time in his life to support him in raising a large increase in his loans. At this time his total loans from Swedish banks were estimated at half of the Swedish reserve currency, which had started to have negative effects on the value of the Swedish currency in the international financial market. In order to grant him more loans, the government required that a complete statement of accounts of Kreuger's entire company group be presented, as the bank's (Sveriges Riksbank) own calculations showed that Kreuger & Toll finances were far too weak to give him more loans.

At that time, Ivar Kreuger was in the United States and was asked to return to Europe for a meeting with the chairman of the Riksbank, Ivar Rooth. He had left Sweden for the last time on 23 November 1931 and returned to Europe on the ship Ile de France, arriving in Paris on 11 March 1932. The meeting with Ivar Rooth was scheduled to take place on 13 or 14 March in Berlin. He met with Krister Littorin (vice president of Kreuger & Toll holding) and his own banker Oscar Rydbeck in Paris on 11 March to prepare for the Berlin meeting. But the day after, he was found dead in bed in his apartment at Avenue Victor Emanuel III. After questioning Kreuger's servants (his French maid, Mademoiselle Barrault, and the janitor who had had contact with Kreuger in the morning) the French police and a physician came to the conclusion that he had shot himself some time between 10:45 a.m. and 12:10 p.m. A 9mm semi-automatic gun was found on the bed beside the body.

He left a sealed envelope in the room, addressed to Krister Littorin, which contained three other sealed envelopes – one addressed to his sister Britta; one to Sune Schéle; and one addressed to Littorin. In the letter to Littorin (for some reason written in English although Littorin was his closest Swedish colleague), he wrote:

I have made such a mess of things that I believe this to be the most satisfactory solution for everybody concerned. Please, take care of these two letters also see that two letters which were sent a couple of days ago by Jordahl to me at 5, Avenue Victor Emanuel are returned to Jordahl. The letters were sent by Majestic – Goodbye now and thanks. I K.

Kreuger was interred in Norra begravningsplatsen in Stockholm.

== Murder allegations ==
While his family believed Ivar Kreuger to have been murdered, it was only more than 30 years after his death that many previously classified Kreuger & Toll documents and Ivar Kreuger documents were made public. Based on these and his insight in his brother's business and life, Ivar's brother Torsten Kreuger wrote a book in 1963 (2nd edition) called Kreuger & Toll, describing how Kreuger & Toll had been taken over, and how then the other Kreuger companies were taken over too. In 1965, Torsten Kreuger published Sanningen om Ivar Kreuger (published in English as: "Ivar Kreuger: The Truth at Last") arguing that his brother Ivar had been murdered. Recently, more books have been written saying more documents have re-appeared or were finally released to public scrutiny, and supporting Torsten Kreuger's assertions that his brother was murdered: Därför mördades Ivar Kreuger ('The Reason for the Murder of Ivar Kreuger') (ISBN 91-7055-019-0) (1990), and Kreuger-Mordet: En utredning med nya fakta ('The Kreuger Murder: An Investigation with New Facts') (ISBN 91-630-9780-X) (2000).

== Kreuger Crash ==
Kreuger's death precipitated the Kreuger Crash which hit investors and companies worldwide, but particularly hard in the United States and Sweden. In 1933 and 1934, the U.S. Congress passed several security reform legislations that were meant to prevent a repeat of the Kreuger Crash. These bills were largely successful in their mission and the American financial industry did not witness frauds of the same magnitude until the Enron scandal and Bernard Madoff's Ponzi scheme.

A Foreign Affairs report from 1930 had judged that of the $630m worth of assets the company claimed to have, $200m came from the match business, $30m were in the bank, and the other $400m were merely categorized as "other investments". When the company finally went bankrupt at the end of March 1932, claimed assets of $250m turned out to be non-existent.

Prior to the crash, Kreuger had issued thousands of participating debentures. These were very popular, and a firm public belief in the rising Kreuger empire convinced contemporary Swedes to invest in these "Kreuger papers". Following the Kreuger crash, both the debentures and shares became worthless, and several thousand Swedes and small banks lost their savings and investments as a result. Large investors and suppliers apart from share holders, received a total of 43% back. The banks related to the Wallenberg family company group, Stenbeck company group, and Handelsbanken took over most of the companies in the Kreuger empire. Swedish Match recovered shortly after the crash as did most of the industrial companies within the Kreuger empire. Swedish Match received a large government guaranteed loan that was fully repaid after several years. IMCO in US however did not survive. The liquidation took nine years and was eventually finished in 1941.

== Legacy ==
One biographer called him a genius and swindler. John Kenneth Galbraith wrote "Boiler-room operators, peddlers of stocks in the imaginary Canadian mines, mutual-fund managers whose genius and imagination are unconstrained by integrity, as well as less exotic larcenists, should read about Kreuger. He was the Leonardo of their craft." Ivar himself admitted to some extent that not all was above board when he said, "I've built my enterprise on the firmest ground that can be found—the foolishness of people." Andrew Beattie said: "Ivar Kreuger is still a bit of an enigma in history. ...At times it seemed that he was a solid, if ruthless, businessman, and at other times he appeared every inch a scam artist. Between those times, he either built a match monopoly that overreached or orchestrated one of the biggest pyramid schemes in history."

Accounting standards and auditors' responsibility for the accuracy of financial statements evolved over time. Corporations resisted publishing audited financial statements. US Steel defied convention when it published its first audited financial statements in 1903. Indeed, accountants in the early 1900s "fiercely resisted efforts to impose strict accounting standards". It was not until the US Securities Acts of 1933 and 1934—both heavily influenced by Kreuger's actions—that generally accepted accounting principles (GAAP) began to be established. Only in the 1970s and 1980s were auditors forced to accept more responsibility for the veracity of financial statements, but loopholes continued to exist (and probably still do).

Kreuger got the nickname "Saviour of Europe" by lending about $400 million (equivalent to c. $6 billion today) to rebuild their shattered economies after World War I. He invented new financial instruments to help him raise funds and, of course, make him money. Indeed, many consider him to be the father of modern financial schemes. Oscar Rydbeck, his Swedish banker, said Ivar was the third richest man in the world. He, however, claimed "money as such means nothing to me". He controlled many legitimate, profitable businesses, some of which still exist to this day. (Examples include Swedish Match, Ericsson, Boliden AB, Europe's largest gold mine, Skandinaviska Banken, largest ball-bearing manufacturer in the world SKF, largest iron ore mine in the world LKAB, Swedish Film Industry SF Studios, one of largest forestry companies in the world SCA, Hufvudstaden, Stora Kopparberg AB, Deutsche Bank.) "Kreuger & Toll kept few accounting records despite the fact that it was a multibillion-dollar international conglomerate with over 400 subsidiaries."

== Influence in popular culture ==
Ayn Rand's 1934 play Night of January 16th features a powerful Scandinavian tycoon recognizably modeled after Kreuger. It was later adapted into a 1941 film of the same name, albeit with numerous script alterations.

Graham Greene's novel England Made Me (1935) also references the businessman. However, in the 1973 film adaptation of Greene's novel, the setting is changed from Sweden to Germany.

The pre-code film The Match King (1932) is a fictionalized account of Kreuger's life. His rise and subsequent downfall are also mentioned by characters in another pre-code film Forgotten (1933).

His life was dramatised in the 1959 television play The Fabulous Money Maker.

The character Gregor Antonescu in Terence Rattigan's play Man and Boy is partly based on Kreuger.

== See also ==
- Kreuger & Toll
- List of unsolved deaths
- The Match King, 1932 film based on Kreuger's life
