= Torsten Kreuger =

Swedish industrialist (1884–1973)

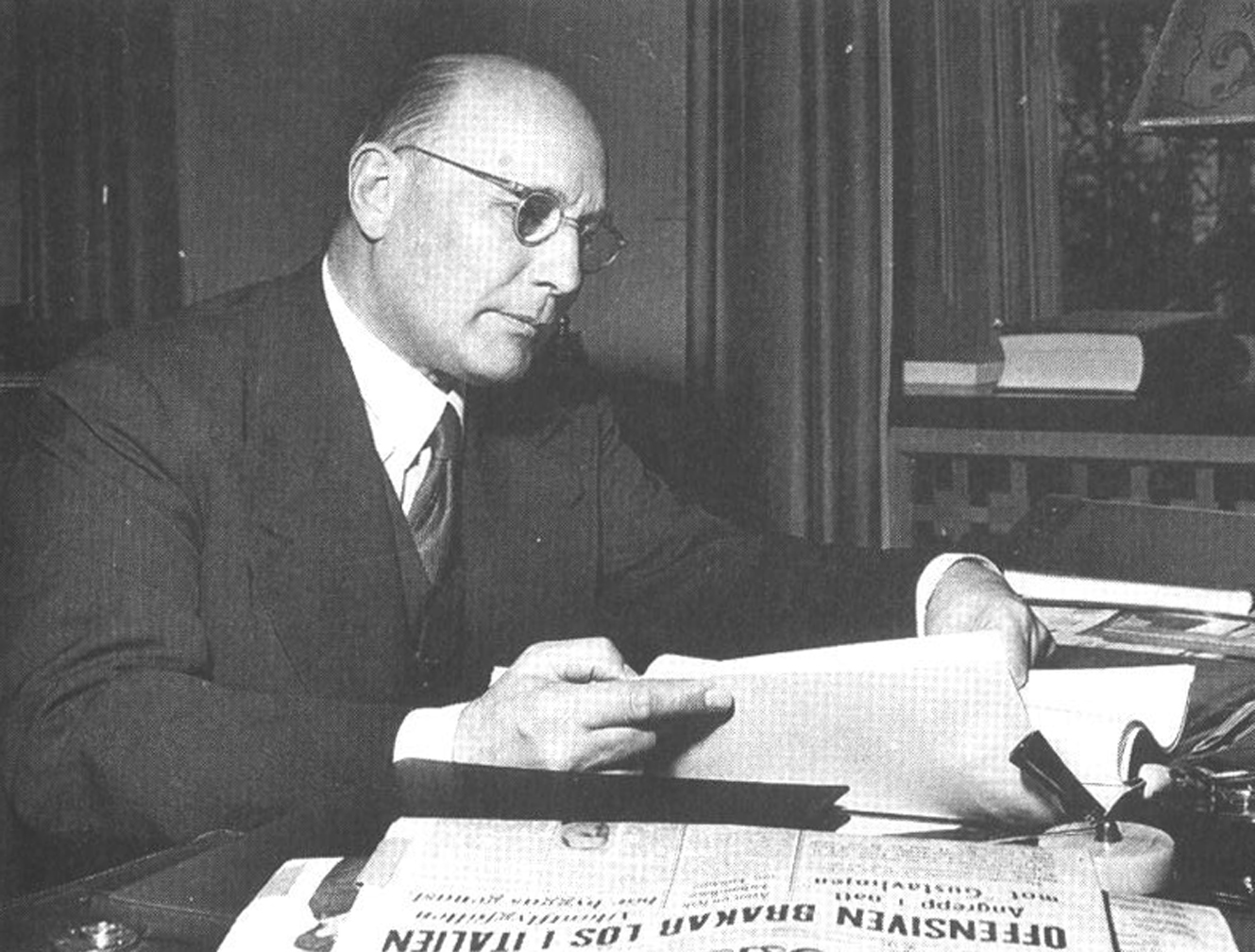
- Kreuger in 1943
- Born: 17 June 1884; Kalmar, Sweden
- Died: 12 October 1973 (aged 89)
- Education: engineer
- Alma mater: Chalmers University of Technology; KTH Royal Institute of Technology
- Occupations: industrialist, newspaper owner and banker
- Relatives: Ivar Kreuger (brother)

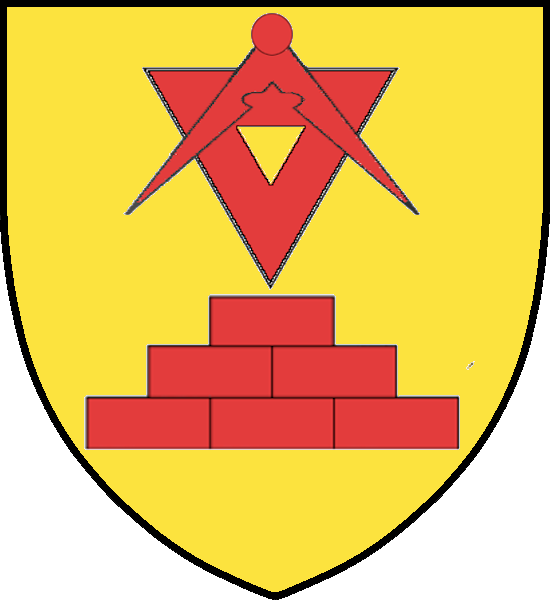
COA for Torsten Kreuger

Torsten Kreuger (17 June 1884 – 12 October 1973) was a Swedish engineer, industrialist, newspaper owner and banker.

== Personal life ==
Kreuger was born in Kalmar, a son of Ernst August Kreuger, and a brother of Ivar Kreuger. He was married three times, first to Elsa Anna Cecilia Tamm (from 1913), second to Mary Wilhelmina Nobel (from 1934), and third to Diana Blanchfleure Hedberg (from 1942).

=== Issue ===
With Diana Blanchfleure Hedberg

- 6 Sten Kreuger (b. 1944)
- 7 John Kreuger (b. 1945)

⚭: Estelle Ax:son Johnson (b.?) m.?- div.?; member of the Ax:son Johnson Family
⚭: Princess Irina of Romania, third daughter of King Michael I of Romania and his wife Queen Anne, m. 1983 - div. 2003

  - Michael Torsten de Roumanie-Kreuger (b. 1984) ⚭ Tara Marie Littlefield
    - Kohen de Roumanie-Kreuger (b. 2012)
  - Angelica Margareta Bianca de Roumanie-Kreuger (b. 1986) ⚭ Richard Robert Knight (div. 2018)
    - Courtney Bianca Knight (b. 2007)
    - Diana Knight (b. 2011)

== Career ==
Kreuger graduated from the Chalmers University of Technology in 1905, and undertook further studies at the KTH Royal Institute of Technology. On behalf of his father and uncle he established and developed the match factory Kalmar tändsticksfabrik, and was also involved in a factory for producing machinery for match production.

During the 1920s he became interested in acquiring ownership of newspapers. He was owner of the newspapers Stockholms Dagblad and Aftonbladet, and for a short period also Stockholms-Tidningen. In 1932 he was sentenced to prison for fraud.
