= Paul Toll =

Swedish engineer

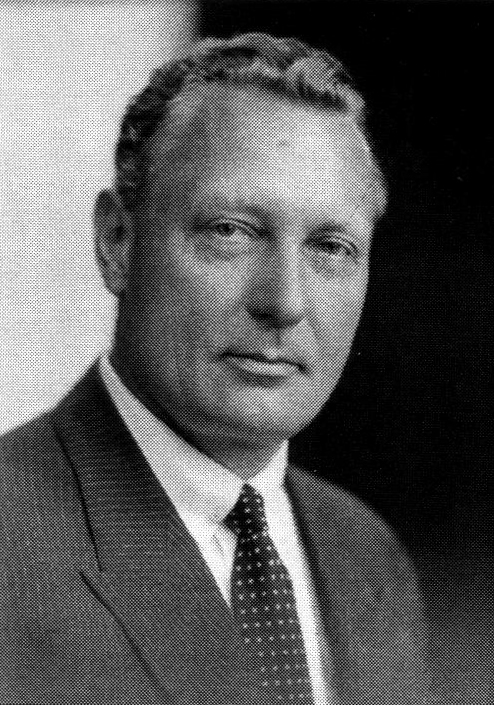
Paul Toll, 1932.

Paul Sequens Esaias Toll (September 7, 1882 in Småland – July 3, 1946) was a Swedish construction engineer and co-founder, together with Ivar Kreuger, of the construction company Kreuger & Toll.

Paul Toll was born in the parish of Berga in Kronoberg County, Småland. The name Toll springs from the small village Tollstad, south of Alvestra in the province of Östergötland, Sweden. In 1913, he married Gunhild Engwall, with whom he raised six children.

Together with Ivar Kreuger, Paul Toll formed the engineering and construction company Kreuger & Toll in 1908. Toll played the main role in the construction projects while Ivar Kreuger handled the business contacts and marketing of the company. When he met Ivar Kreuger in early 1908, Ivar offered him the position of joint owner in a newly established company. Paul wrote a letter to his father Karl Toll on 23 March 1908 to give him some information about Ivar and probably to ask his father for advice on what to do, as Paul Toll was working for another company at that time: (translated to English), "After a 7-year period working as a trainee in America, engineer Kreuger, that is his name, has worked with a lot projects with concrete steel in different places around the world. He has now made me an offer to become his joint owner." This was the starting point for one of the world's most famous companies, not in the construction business but as a holding company mainly in the match industry with the name Kreuger & Toll AB that did not include the construction business.

After some years Ivar Kreuger became more focused in founding large corporations. To start with in the match-industry to save the Kreuger family match factories around Kalmar that was facing financial problems in 1912 and later in other industries. In 1917 Ivar founded the company Kreuger & Toll Construction AB, run and owned (60%) by Paul Toll. Ivar owned a small part of that company, how much is not known. Kreuger & Toll AB then became a holding company, run by Ivar Kreuger. Paul and Ivar, however kept a close contact over the years as Ivar insisted on keeping Paul as a member of the board for Kreuger & Toll AB, handling the Kreugers construction business within the subsidiary real estate company Hufvudstaden AB. The construction business grow rapidly both within and outside Sweden.

The construction company mainly worked in Scandinavia but also had a small company in Russia, registered in 1911, with Ludvig Nobel as a member of the board and the office in Sankt Petersburg. Ivar Kreuger was behind the economic work to set up the company and Paul handled the construction work. An industrial building for ASEA was set up in the city of Jaroslav north east of Moscow with a number of other buildings. However the Russian business came to a sudden stop in 1916 due to internal company problems just before the Russian Revolution broke out in 1917 when all subsidiaries whose main company was outside Russia were forbidden to have any activities in Russia, and all foreign property was confiscated.

In 1932 when the Kreuger Crash came, most parts of the holding company went bankrupt but Kreuger & Toll Construction AB survived, but suffered from the bad reputation that the name 'Kreuger' had got. Paul then changed the company name to just Toll Construction AB and continued to work with new projects. The construction company's most famous projects, going back to early 1910, were the NK warehouse (1913–14), the Stockholm Olympic Stadium (1911–12) and the Södersjukhuset hospital (1944) in Stockholm. Henrik Kreüger, Ivars Kreuger's cousin, was working as a consultant and chief engineer for the company from the start in 1908 and played a major role in the construction business success.

Paul was a member of the board for the Kreuger & Toll holding company all along until the Kreuger Crash in 1932 but did not participate much in these discussions, as he was occupied with the continuously growing construction business. To what extent Ivar was involved in the construction business beyond 1917, when the Swedish Match had been founded and the Russian subsidiary company was closed down, is not clear but he certainly had business contacts that the Kreuger & Toll Construction AB could benefit from, and Ivar and Paul often met in their free time.

Paul Toll built up a large company group of his own during the years 1917 until 1932 by acquiring other construction related companies and developing the business. By 1930 he had control over a large company group including Sand & Grus AB (including Jehander), Svenska Murbruks AB, Kasper Höglund AB, Kanal & Invallningsbolaget, Haga tegelbruk, Ölands Cement AB among others. The real estates Karlavägen 57 (Stockholm), Kommendörsgatan 16 (Stockholm), the farmland estates Husby at Munsö, Äleby at Selaön and Fållnäs in Sorunda (Stockholm) were some of his private properties. The family had their private residence at Villagatan 10 (Stockholm) just across the street where Ivar Kreuger had his apartment at Villagatan 13A & B, and a summerhouse they called "Hagen", bought in 1917, in the north eastern part of the island of Lidingö outside Stockholm.

== Sources ==
- Toll, Magnus: Paul Toll 1882-1946, ingeniör-entreprenör. 1996. Swedish language. No ISBN. Private book, written by Magnus Toll, 1925–1997, youngest son of Paul Toll and his wife Gunhild, née Engwall. The booklet was distributed to family-members, i.g. all descendants of Paul Toll and his wife Gunhild.
