= Henrik Kreüger =

Swedish engineer

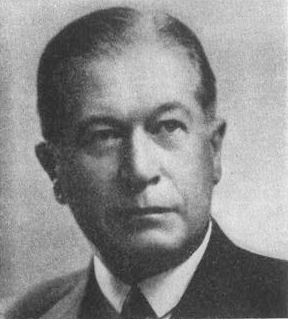
Henrik Kreüger, around 1930–40

Henrik Kreüger (1882–1953) was born in Kalmar, Sweden, and obtained his M.Sc. in civil engineering in 1904 at the Royal Institute of Technology in Stockholm.

After graduating, he worked for the construction company Fritz Söderbergh in Stockholm until 1908, when he went back to the university to work as an employed teacher at the faculty for civil engineering. In parallel he also worked as a consulting engineer for the construction company Kreuger & Toll that started their business in 1908, a couple of months after Ivar Kreuger had returned from America. Henrik Kreüger and Ivar Kreuger formed an affiliate to the US company Trussed Concrete Steel Company in Sweden early 1908, but later Ivar decided to form his own construction company to become independent of the US company. However, Ivar preferred to form this new company (Kreuger & Toll) together with engineer Paul Toll that had several years of practical experience in the construction business. Henrik Kreüger then came to work as a consulting engineer responsible for the basic design work and calculations. The three partners Ivar, Paul and Henrik, won several prestigious contracts such as the construction of the Stockholm Olympic Stadium (1911–12), the foundation work for the new Stockholm City Hall (1912–13) and the department store NK (1913–14) in Stockholm.

Kreüger made important contributions in the area of ventilation and insulation at the faculty of civil engineering, where he was a professor from 1914 to 1943. Kreüger served as Rector of the Royal Institute of Technology in Stockholm from 1931 to 1943. Henrik Kreüger was a first cousin of Ivar Kreuger.

His parents were Oscar Lorentz Kreuger (born 1848), married in 1874 to Ebba Sparre af Söfdeborg (born 1855). Oscar Lorentz Kreuger was a brother to Ernst August Kreuger, the father to Ivar Kreuger.

== References and notes ==
- "Kreüger, Henrik", Nationalencyklopedin, on-line edition. (requires subscription). Retrieved December 27, 2007.
- "Henrik Kreüger", Nordisk familjebok, Volume 36 (Supplement, Globe - Kövess), 1924, column 1202.
- Toll, Magnus: Paul Toll 1882-1946, ingeniör-entreprenör. 1996.
- Thunholm, Lars-Erik (2002). Ivar Kreuger: the match king. Translated by Thiel, George. Stockholm: Fischer. ISBN 91-7054-958-3. SELIBR 8505964.
