= IMCO Carbide Tool =

American manufacturing company

Coordinates: 41°35′54″N 83°32′44″W

IMCO Carbide Tool Inc.
- Type: Private (family owned)
- Industry: Cutting tools
- Founded: 1977
- Headquarters: Perrysburg Twp, Ohio
- Key people: Perry Osburn, President & CEO; Matthew S. Osburn,
- Products: End mills, drills, burs
- Website: www.imcousa.com

IMCO Carbide Tool is an American manufacturing company that researches, designs and manufactures high-performance cutting tools for a variety of applications in the aerospace, automotive, medical, petrochemical, and manufacturing industries. Founded in 1977 by Lawrence R. Osburn and headquartered in Perrysburg Twp, Ohio, IMCO serves a diverse customer base of small job shops to large production operations around the world.

== History ==
IMCO Carbide Tool is a family-owned and -operated company founded in 1977 by Lawrence R. Osburn. With his wife and two sons, Perry and Matthew, Osburn built his business in general-purpose end mills, burs, routers and drills for the automotive and manufacturing industries.

The sons served as company vice presidents, until Perry succeeded his father as President in 1984, with Matthew continuing as Vice President in charge of factory set-up, production processes, hiring, training, inventory management, supplier relations and quality oversight. As the machining industry was challenged by engineered materials with difficult-to-machine characteristics and more demanding specifications and tolerances, the brothers turned their focus on developing tools to meet those challenges.

IMCO began to research and develop end mills, working with customers to create tools capable of much higher performance with new and emerging high-speed machining technologies. Versatile tools dubbed Streaker M2 end mills were introduced in 1988. Streakers were designed especially for working in aluminum. A notoriously "soft" metal, aluminum tends to meld in the intense heat of the cutting zone before the chips can be evacuated. This causes the chips to congeal in the cutting zone, requiring downtime to clear the blockage and, often, replace the tool. Tests with customer shops showed that Streakers eliminate this clogging problem.

IMCO's M7 Omega-6 end mills, introduced in 2000, were designed to resolve problems in achieving high surface finishes, especially in hard-to-machine materials. Soon thereafter, IMCO launched another new product called enDURO M5 end mills, developed especially for working in and finishing aerospace alloys (titanium, stainless steels) and high-silicon aluminum. This line includes three- and five-flute designs to accommodate varying needs for chipload, chip evacuation and finish quality.

== Products ==
IMCO tools are designed, tested, sourced and manufactured in the U.S. for machining in a wide range of materials, such as aluminum, carbon and stainless steel, tool steels, titanium, cast iron, high-temperature alloys, copper and magnesium alloys, brass, bronze, composites, plastics, and graphite. IMCO tool categories include high-performance and general-purpose end mills, burs, drills, countersinks, rougher/finishers, reamers, routers, die trimmers and custom-made, special purpose precision tools for industrial applications. The company also performs custom modifications to off-the-shelf cutting tools.

IMCO Carbide Tool products begin with "blanks," or rods of micrograin carbide or ultra-fine micrograin carbide, because of its extreme hardness and favorable heat resistance.

IMCO specializes in high-performance end mills designed with variable fluting. Varying flute geometries break up the harmonics, or multiple mechanical frequencies that develop as tools spin and can cause tool instability and failure. Variable fluting breaks up harmonics and keeps the tool balanced as it turns for optimum tool stability. This, in turn, enables the tool to cut with greater precision.
