= Kreuger & Toll =

Swedish construction and holding company (1908–1968, merger)

Kreuger & Toll was a construction and holding company founded on May 18, 1908, by two Swedish engineers, Ivar Kreuger and Paul Toll, with Henrik Kreüger working as a consultant and chief engineer.

== History ==
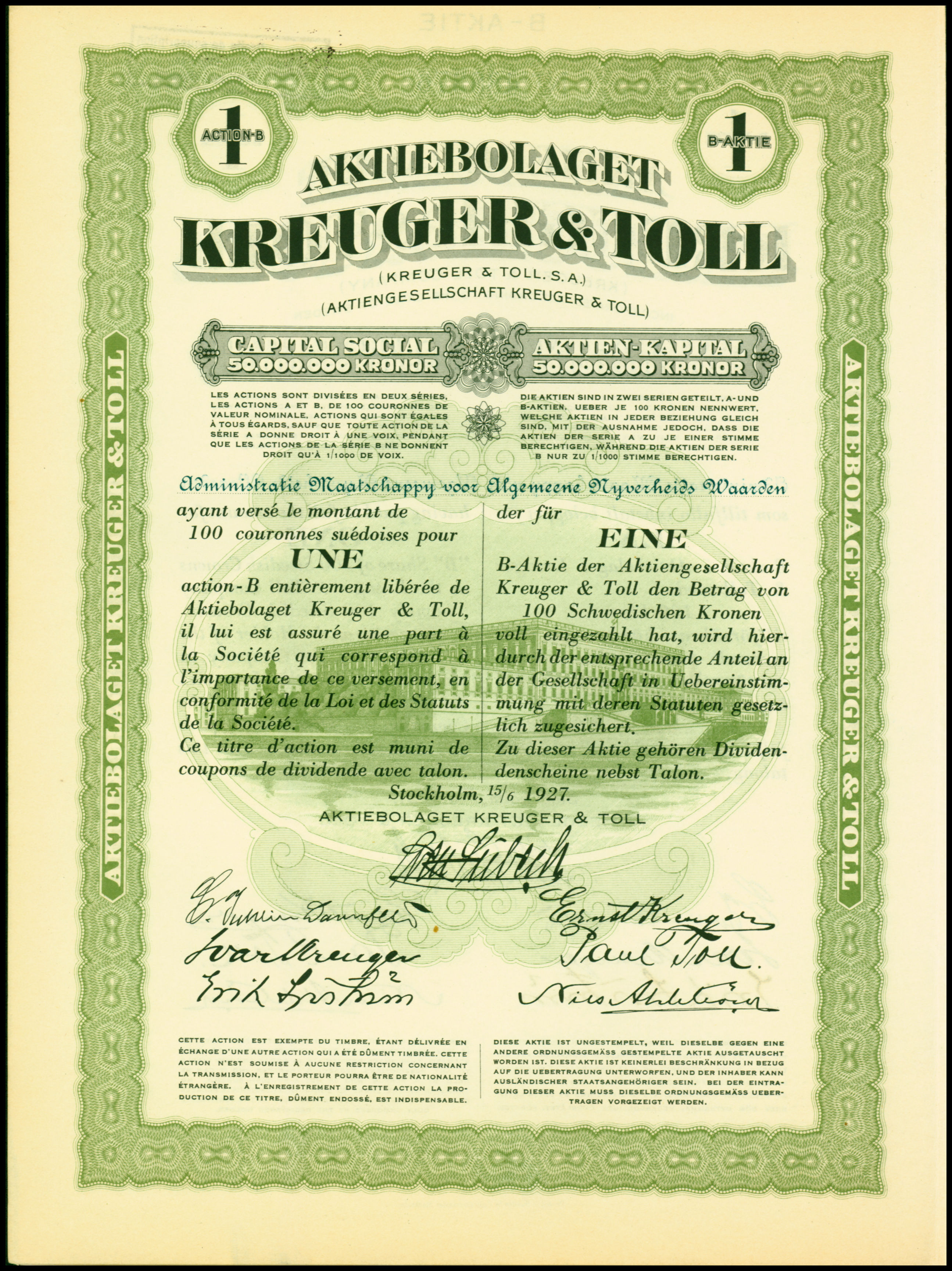
Share of the Aktiebolaget Kreuger & Toll, issued 15. June 1927

Early 1908, Ivar and his cousin Henrik Kreüger planned to establish a construction company that would work for the US company Trussed Concrete Steel Co. on the Swedish market to represent its new building methods based on reinforced concrete. At the same time Henrik Kreüger had introduced Paul Toll to Ivar. It turned out that Ivar formed the company with Paul, who had several years of practical experience in the construction business as an engineer, and was later site manager for the Swedish construction company Kasper & Höglund AB.

The company was founded as a construction company with the name Kreuger & Toll on May 18, 1908, by Ivar Kreuger and Paul Toll with a total start capital of 10,000 SEK. The company was set up with Kreuger owning 60% and a profits being split 50/50. The original capital was raised by the banker Oscar Rydbeck that became Ivar's main bank contact and economic adviser all along until the so-called Kreuger crash in April 1932. On August 10, 1911, the company changed to AB with the registered name Kreuger & Toll AB.

In 1917 Kreuger & Toll AB was divided in two parts: Kreuger & Toll Construction AB, run by Paul Toll, and the holding company Kreuger & Toll AB, run by Ivar Kreuger. At the same time Swedish Match was founded. In parallel Kreuger started to invest in a number of industrial companies, mainly in the Swedish industry. In 1923 Kreuger founded the holding company IMCO (International Match Corporation) together with Lee, Higginson & Co. in New York City. IMCO handled the Kreuger match business in America, South America and other countries outside Europe.

During the year 1930, 64% of the entire trade on the Stockholm stock exchange was related to Kreuger companies, which also were involved in complicated international financial operations.

In April 1932, a month after Kreuger's suicide, most of the Kreuger empire went bankrupt as well as Ivar Kreuger himself, who left nothing behind for his family. All of Kreuger's personal belongings, including houses, boats, furniture, paintings, etc., was sold at several auctions in 1932. Kreuger & Toll Construction AB however survived, as this company did not belong to the holding company, although the financial connections between these companies was never fully clarified. The company changed its name to Toll Construction AB. The company merged with another Swedish construction company in 1968. Swedish Match was reconstructed in 1936 with the help of government guaranteed loans that was repaid within a couple of years, but IMCO did not survive. The work with the bankruptcy took nine years, and was not completed until 1941. One of the reasons for the long investigation time was that the documentation was insufficient, transactions were difficult to follow and complex cross-ownerships between the companies that was almost impossible to straighten out. Ivar Kreuger also had made complex transactions that no one else except himself knew about. Only Kreuger had the full view of how the company was built up.

A summary of the economics for the holding company Kreuger & Toll AB, including the American holding company IMCO, excluding the construction business within Kreuger & Toll Construction AB, was carried out in 1943, showing the following figures:

- Actual profits generated from 1917–1932: 151 million SEK (in year 2007 equal to 4 000 million SEK)
- Actual return value to owners of shares and debentures, 1917–1932: 668 million SEK (in year 2007 equal to 18 500 million SEK)

To cover this huge gap, analysts have claimed that Ivar Kreuger's intention was probably to slowly increase the match prices as soon as he had gained control of the entire match production in the world, parallel with the increased profits from his industrial companies that soon became a large part of the holding company's business, and continuously increasing during 1930, while the match industry had a tendency to slowly decrease in importance.

Swedish Match and Kreuger & Toll AB holding company headquarters was the Tändstickspalatset (Matchstick Palace) with the address Västra Trädgårdsgatan 15 in Stockholm, where Ivar Kreuger had his Swedish office. The house was built by Kreuger & Toll Construction AB. The main office for the Swedish Match remained in the same building until 1991.

== Persons behind the foundation of Kreuger & Toll in 1908 ==
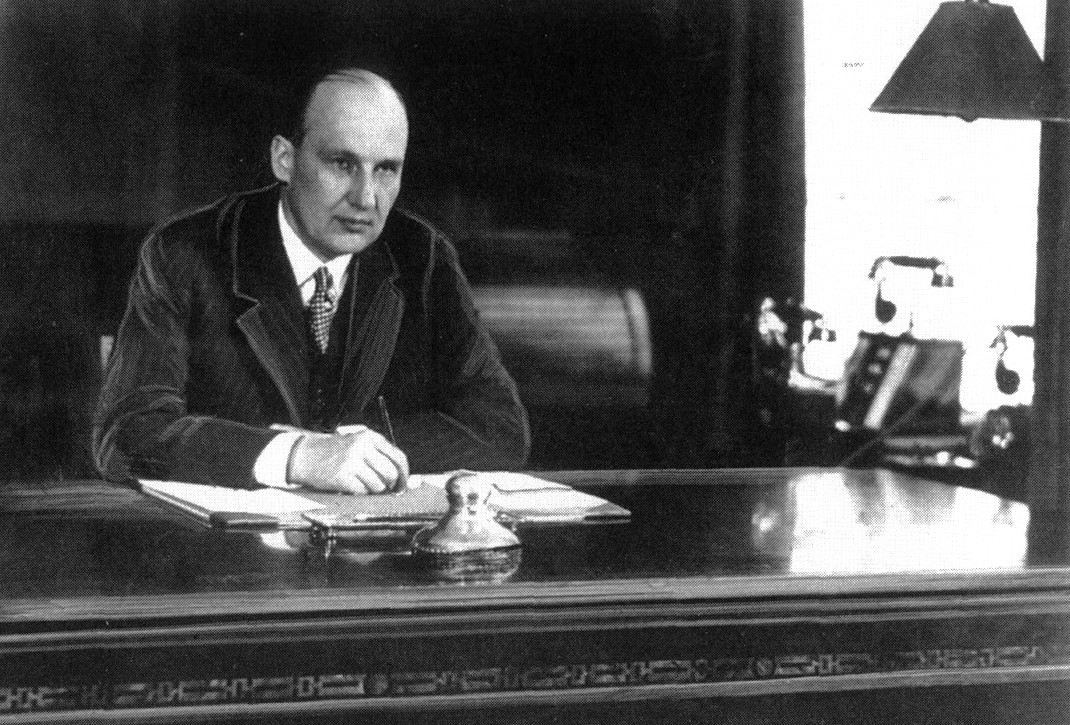
Ivar Kreuger (1880–1932).

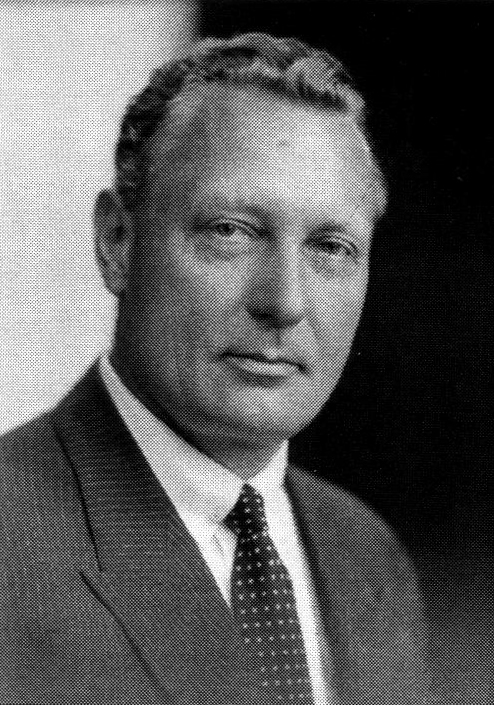
Paul Toll (1882–1946).

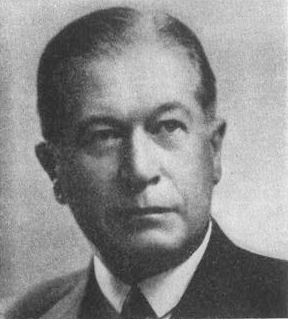
Henrik Kreüger (1882–1953).

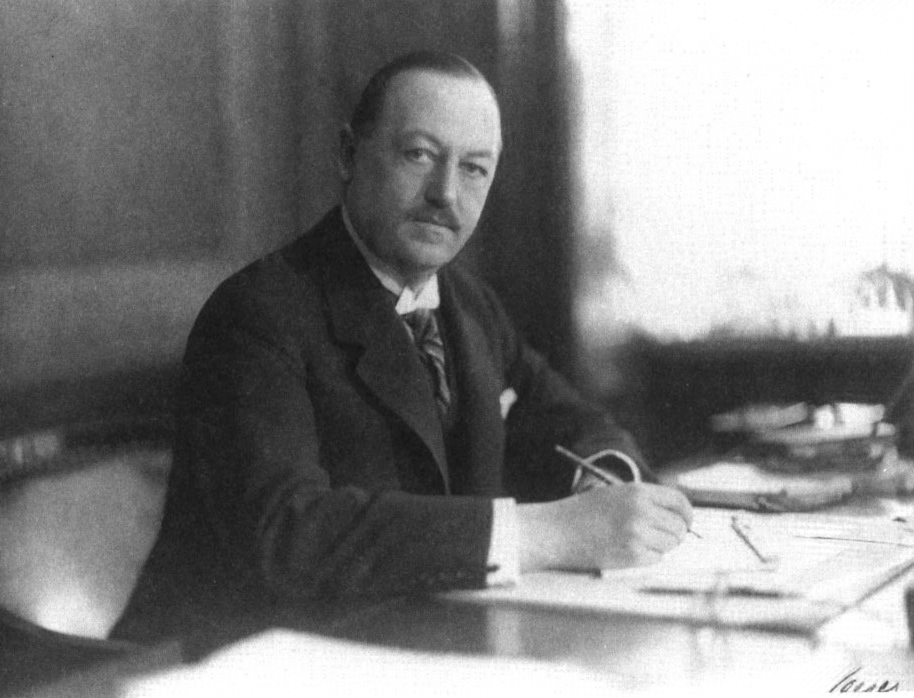
Oscar Rydbeck (1878–1951), banker.

== See also ==
- Kreuger crash
