= Peter Wallenberg =

Peter Wallenberg may refer to:

- Peter Wallenberg, Sr. (1926–2015), Swedish business leader
- Peter Wallenberg, Jr. (born 1959), Swedish businessman and racing driver

== See also ==
- Peder Wallenberg (born 1935), Swedish businessman and architect
