= Erik Belfrage =

Swedish diplomat (1946–2020)

- Born: Erik Jean Christian Antoine Belfrage; 13 April 1946; Paris, France
- Died: 18 April 2020 (aged 74); Stockholm, Sweden
- Education: Stockholm School of Economics
- Occupation(s): Diplomat, banking executive, political consultant
- Relatives: Frank Belfrage (brother)

Erik Jean Christian Antoine Belfrage (13 April 1946 – 18 April 2020) was a Swedish diplomat, banking executive, and political consultant. He had a career as a diplomat, working for the Swedish Ministry for Foreign Affairs from 1970 to 1987, before moving into the private sector as vice president at Skandinaviska Enskilda Banken and advisor to Investor AB. Belfrage held various leadership roles, including chairman positions at the Swedish Institute of Management, Centre for European Policy Studies, and the Swedish Institute of International Affairs, and played a significant role in the International Chamber of Commerce's initiatives on responsible business conduct.

== Early life and education ==
Belfrage was born on 13 April 1946 in Paris, France, the son of envoy Kurt-Allan Belfrage and his wife Renée (née Puaux). His brother, Frank Belfrage, is an economist and diplomat. Belfrage attended the Stockholm School of Economics from 1964 to 1968 and received a civilekonom degree in 1970.

== Career ==
Belfrage worked in the Ministry for Foreign Affairs from 1970 to 1987 as a diplomat in Geneva, Washington, D.C., Bucharest, Stockholm, and Paris. In 1987, he became vice president at Skandinaviska Enskilda Banken and as an adviser to Investor AB. Belfrage also served as an advisor to Peter Wallenberg and the Wallenberg family between 1987 and 2012.

He was the chairman of the Swedish Institute of Management (Institutet för Företagsledning), the Centre for European Policy Studies, and the Swedish Institute of International Affairs, chairman of the Sigtuna School Foundation, a board member of Saab AB and Scandinavian Airlines (SAS), and vice chairman of the International Chamber of Commerce's Finance Commission in Paris. Belfrage was also a member of the Trilateral Commission and a board member of the Jacques Delors Institute.

As the chair of the International Chamber of Commerce's Global Commission on Responsible Business Conduct, Belfrage played a key role in shaping the efforts that have, in recent years, positioned the ICC and the global business community as natural participants in multilateral discussions on sustainable development—encompassing economic, social, and environmental aspects. Belfrage also served as an advisor to two of ICC's global chairs, Peter Wallenberg from 1989 to 1990 and Marcus Wallenberg from 2006 to 2007. From 2013 to 2019, he was the chair of ICC's association of European national committees.

== Personal life ==
In 1993, Belfrage married Anna Carlberg (born 1953).

== Death ==
After suffering from COVID-19 during its pandemic, Belfrage died at Saint Göran Hospital in Stockholm on 18 April 2020.

== Awards ==
- Grand Decoration of Honour in Silver for Services to the Republic of Austria (1997)
- International Chamber of Commerce Sweden Medal of Merit (31 March 2023)
