= Jacob Wallenberg (1892–1980) =

Swedish banker (1892–1980)

Jacob Wallenberg KmstkVO KmstkNO
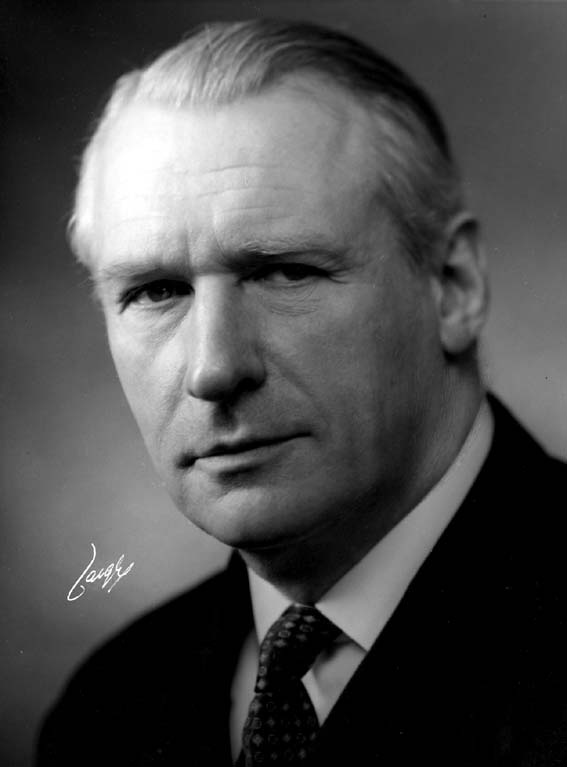
- Jacob Wallenberg during the 1960s
- Born: 22 September 1892; Stockholm, Sweden
- Died: 1 August 1980 (aged 87); Stockholm, Sweden
- Education: Stockholm School of Economics
- Occupation: Banker
- Children: Peder Wallenberg
- Parent(s): Marcus Wallenberg; Amalia Wallenberg
- Relatives: Marcus Wallenberg Jr. (brother); Peter Wallenberg Sr. (nephew); Marc Wallenberg (nephew)

Jacob "Juju" Wallenberg KmstkVO KmstkNO (27 September 1892 – 1 August 1980) was a Swedish banker and industrial leader. Wallenberg held various central positions in Stockholms Enskilda Bank. He was also chairman of the board of several companies, including Stora Kopparbergs Bergslag and Orkla Mining Company. From 1934 to 1944 he was a member of the Swedish governmental commission for trade with Germany.

== Early life ==
Wallenberg was born in Stockholm, Sweden, the son of Marcus Wallenberg Sr. and his wife Amalia (née Hagdahl) and brother of Marcus Wallenberg Jr. He grew up in Östermalm in Stockholm and spent many summers at Malmvik Estate in Lovön. The tradition in the family was patriarchal, but privately Jacob Wallenberg was subordinate to his mother, the matriarch Amalia, whose birthday the family still celebrates May 29 each year. He moved away from home only when he approached 30 years old, and then just upstairs in the house at Strandvägen 27. After six years of education at the Royal Swedish Naval Academy, Wallenberg became a naval officer in 1912 (later sub-lieutenant in the Swedish Navy reserve in 1920) and graduated from the Stockholm School of Economics in 1914. Wallenberg worked for various banks in Basel, London and New York City from 1915 to 1918 before becoming assistant director of Stockholms Enskilda Bank in 1918.

== Career ==
Wallenberg became Vice CEO of the Stockholms Enskilda Bank and a member of its board of directors in 1920 eventually becoming its CEO on 31 March 1927. He was CEO until 1946 and then vice chairman of the board from 1946 to 1950 and chairman from 1950 to 1969.

Wallenberg was in the early 1930s a board member of Vikmanshytte bruks AB, AB Diligentia, Stockholms Rederi AB Svea, Stockholm-Västerås-Bergslagens Nya Jernvägsaktiebolag, Göta kanalbolag AB, Investor AB, Wedevågs bruks AB, Svenska obligationskreditaktiebolaget AB, International Bk te in Amsterdam and Società Esercizi Telefonici. In the late 1930s, Wallenberg was chairman of the board of Svenska Tändsticks AB and board member of AB Diligentia, AB Obligations-Intressenter, AB Separator, AB Svenska Kullagerfabriken (SKF), Göta kanalbolag, Stockholm-Västerås-Bergslagens Nya Jernvägsaktiebolag, August Stenman AB, Svenska Personal-Pensionskassan, Svenska obligationskreditaktiebolaget AB, Wikmanshytte Bruks AB and Kreutoll Realization Co. He was also voting trustee in the International Match Realization Co. Ltd and was on the board of the National Institute of Economic Research (from 1937) and of the Maritime Museum in Stockholm (from 1939).

Wallenberg was in the mid-1940s chairman of the board of Svenska Tändsticks AB, Svenska Ostasiatiska Kompaniet, AB International Harvester Co. and August Stenman AB. Wallenberg was vice chairman of the board of the Swedish Bankers' Association (Svenska Bankföreningen), Svenska Personal-Pensionskassan and Stora Kopparbergs Bergslags AB. Wallenberg was a board member of AB Diligentia, AB Obligations-Intressenter, AB Separator, AB Svenska Kullagerfabriken, Stockholm-Västerås-Bergslagens Nya Jernvägsaktiebolag, August Stenman AB, Stora Kopparbergs Bergslags AB, Svenska obligationskreditaktiebolaget AB, Wikmanshytte Bruks AB, Kreutoll Realization Co. Furthermore, Wallenberg was board member of Försäkrings AB Skandia-Freja, Göta Kanalbolag, Kopparfors AB and Orkla Grube AB. He was also a member of the government commission for trade agreements with Germany from 1934 to 1944.

Wallenberg was in the mid-1950s chairman of the board of Förvaltnings AB Providentia, AB Investor, AB International Harvester Co., Kemi-Intressen AB, Nordiska Kompaniet (NK), Stora Kopparbergs Bergslags AB, Svenska Diamantbergborrnings AB, AB Svenska Kullagerfabriken, AB Svenska Ostasiatiska Kompaniet, Svenska Tändsticks AB and Wifstavarfs AB, the Royal Swedish Yacht Club (KSSS). He was vice chairman of the board of Försäkrings AB Skandia-Freja, Göta kanalbolag and Orkla Gruve AB. Wallenberg was board member of AB Iggesunds Bruk, Kopparfors AB, AB Separator, August Stenman AB, Wikmanshytte Bruks AB, the Nobel Foundation and the Knut and Alice Wallenberg Foundation.

Wallenberg was in the mid-1960s chairman of the board of Förvaltnings AB Providentia, AB Investor, AB International Harvester Co., Kemi-Intressen AB, Koppartrans olje AB, Orkla Grube AB, AB Separator, Stora Kopparbergs Bergslags AB, AB Svenska Kullagerfabriken, AB Svenska Ostasiatiska Kompaniet, Svenska Tändsticks AB, Wifstavarfs AB and AB Astra from 1957. In the late 1960s, Wallenberg was also chairman of the board of Bergvik & Ala AB. He was a board member of AB Iggesunds Bruk, Nordiska Kompaniet (NK), Skandia, Göta kanalbolag, Wikmanshytte Bruks AB, the Nobel Foundation (from 1952), the Knut and Alice Wallenberg Foundation and King Gustaf V's Jubilee Fund. Wallenberg was treasurer of the Cancer Society in Stockholm. In the late 1960s, Wallenberg became chairman of the board of the Knut and Alice Wallenberg Foundation.

Wallenberg was appointed by the Stockholm School of Economics Association as a member of the Stockholm School of Economics Board of Directors which is the school's highest executive body, where he was treasurer from 1931 to 1955 and vice chairman from 1938 to 1965. He was chairman of the school's deliberative body from 1943 to 1968.

== Personal life ==
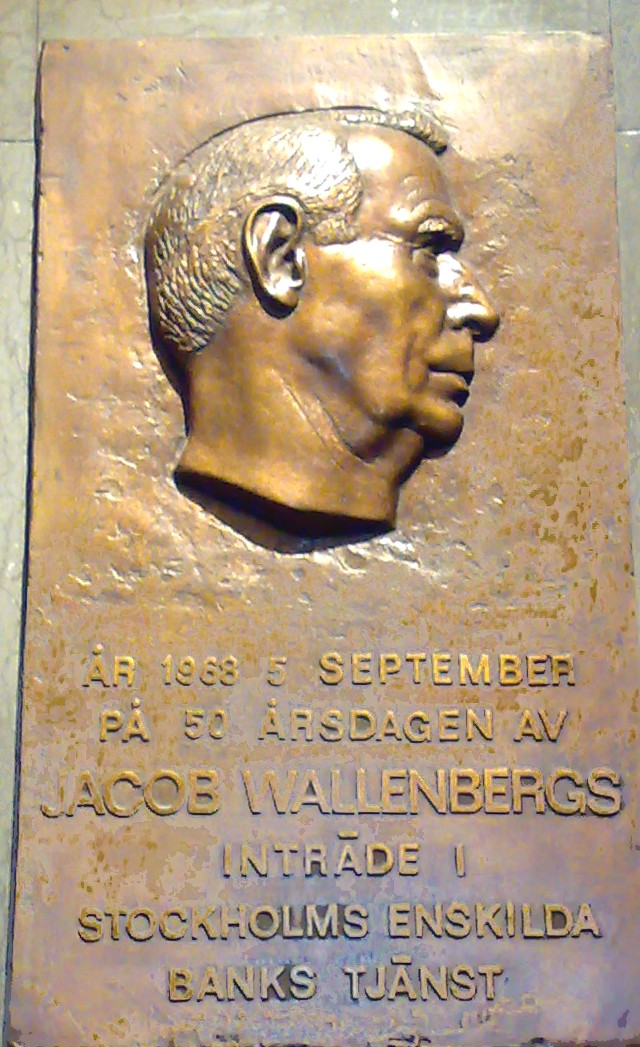
Memorial to Jacob Wallenberg in the entrance hall of SEB's headquarter in Stockholm.

Wallenberg remained unmarried during his life. He had one son, Peder Wallenberg, who was born as a son of the marriage between John-Henry Sager and his wife Madeleine (née Sörensen), but was adopted in 1975 by his biological father Jacob Wallenberg. Peder Wallenberg had a couple of board positions in his father's companies, when Jacob was alive, but remained outside the direction of the Wallenberg sphere, especially after he received his inheritance.

Wallenberg donated a major part of his fortune to two foundations: the Marcus and Amalia Wallenberg Memorial Fund Foundation (Stiftelsen Marcus och Amalia Wallenbergs Minnesfond), which he named to honor his parents, as well as the Jacob Wallenberg Foundation, the Special Fund (Jacob Wallenbergs Stiftelse, Särskilda Fonden). After the death of his parents, Wallenberg inherited Malmviks Estate in Lovön, which became one of his permanent homes. In 1978 he donated Malmvik Estate to the Marcus and Amalia Wallenberg Memorial Fund Foundation.

Jacob Wallenberg's biggest hobby was sailing. For over thirty years, from the mid-1920s, he came to dominate the sailing in the Nordic waters, with several victories in Round Gotland Race and its predecessor, the Visby Yacht Race. His boats, built at August Plym's boatyard in Neglinge, Saltsjöbaden, were named Refanut. The favorite sailor, for half a century, Calle Lindberg from Möja, he appreciated greatly, as well as boat builders Tore Holm and Arvid Laurin. He also participated in the course race and then preferably in the 10mR, which was an Olympic Class. He was chairman of the Royal Swedish Yacht Club (KSSS) for many years and initiated in 1962 Jacob Wallenberg's Naval Academy Fund (Jacob Wallenbergs Sjökrigsskolefond) for the education of students at the Royal Swedish Naval Academy.

== Awards and decorations ==
=== Swedish ===
- (Sweden) Illis Quorum, 18th size (1976)
- (Sweden) King Gustaf V's Jubilee Commemorative Medal (1948)
- (Sweden) Commander Grand Cross of the Order of the Polar Star (17 August 1945)
- (Sweden) Knight of the Order of the Polar Star (1928)
- (Sweden) Commander Grand Cross of the Order of Vasa (23 November 1956)
- (Sweden) Commander 1st Class of the Order of Vasa (6 June 1935)
- (Sweden) Commander of the Order of Vasa (6 June 1931)
- (Sweden) Knight 1st Class of the Order of Vasa (1919)

=== Foreign ===
- (Italy) 1st Class / Knight Grand Cross of the Order of Merit of the Italian Republic (18 January 1972)
- (Nazi Germany) Order of the German Eagle with Star (1941)
- (Denmark) Commander 1st Class of the Order of the Dannebrog
- Commander of the Order of the White Rose of Finland
- (France) Knight of the Legion of Honour

== Honours ==
- Honorary member of the Royal Swedish Society of Naval Sciences (1947)
- Honorary member of the Royal Swedish Yacht Club (1952)
- Member of the Royal Society of Sciences in Uppsala (1955)
- Honorary Doctor of Economics, Stockholm (1956)
- Honorary member of the Royal Swedish Academy of Engineering Sciences (1957)
- Honorary Doctor of Medicine, Stockholm (1960)
- Member of the Royal Swedish Academy of Sciences (1961)
- Honorary member of the Royal Swedish Academy of Letters, History and Antiquities (1972)

== See also ==
- Wallenberg family

Business positions
| Preceded by Joseph Nachmanson | CEO of Stockholms Enskilda Bank (SEB); 1927–1946 | Succeeded by Marcus Wallenberg Jr. |
| Preceded by Robert Ljunglöf | Chairman of Stockholms Enskilda Bank (SEB); 1950–1969 | Succeeded by Marcus Wallenberg Jr. |
