= 2019 TCR Scandinavia Touring Car Championship =

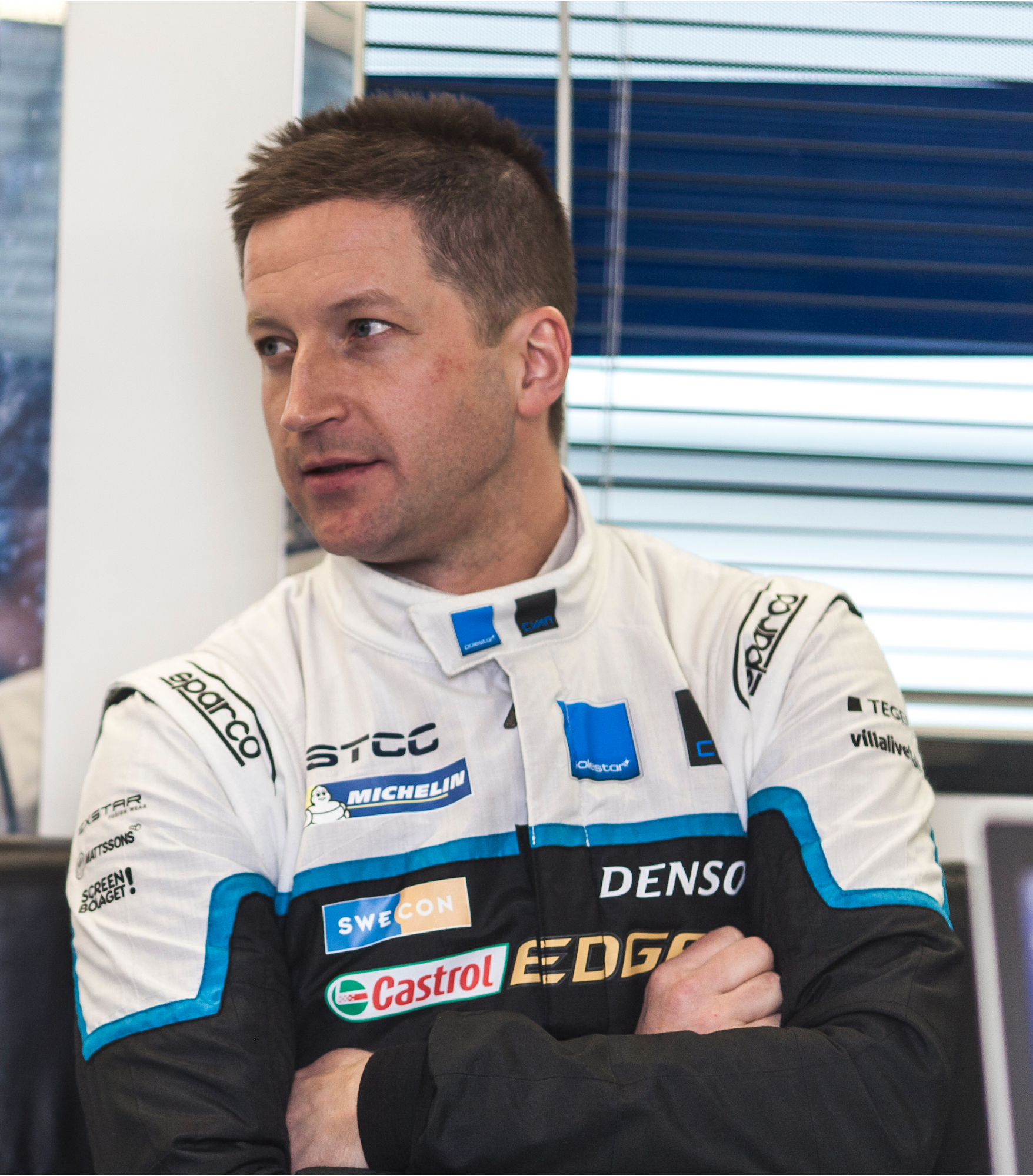
Robert Dahlgren won the Drivers' championship.

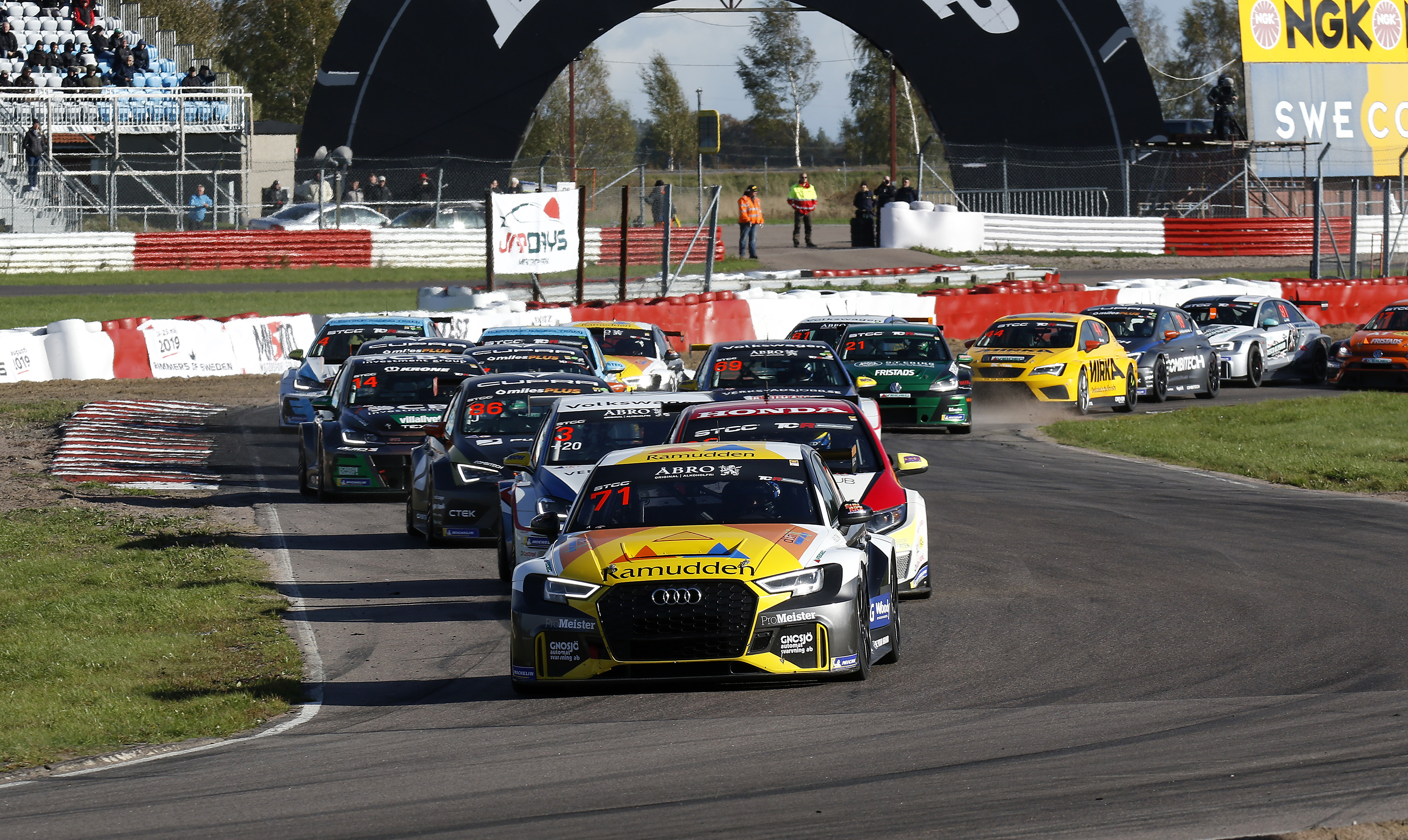
Tobias Brink placed second in the Drivers' championship.

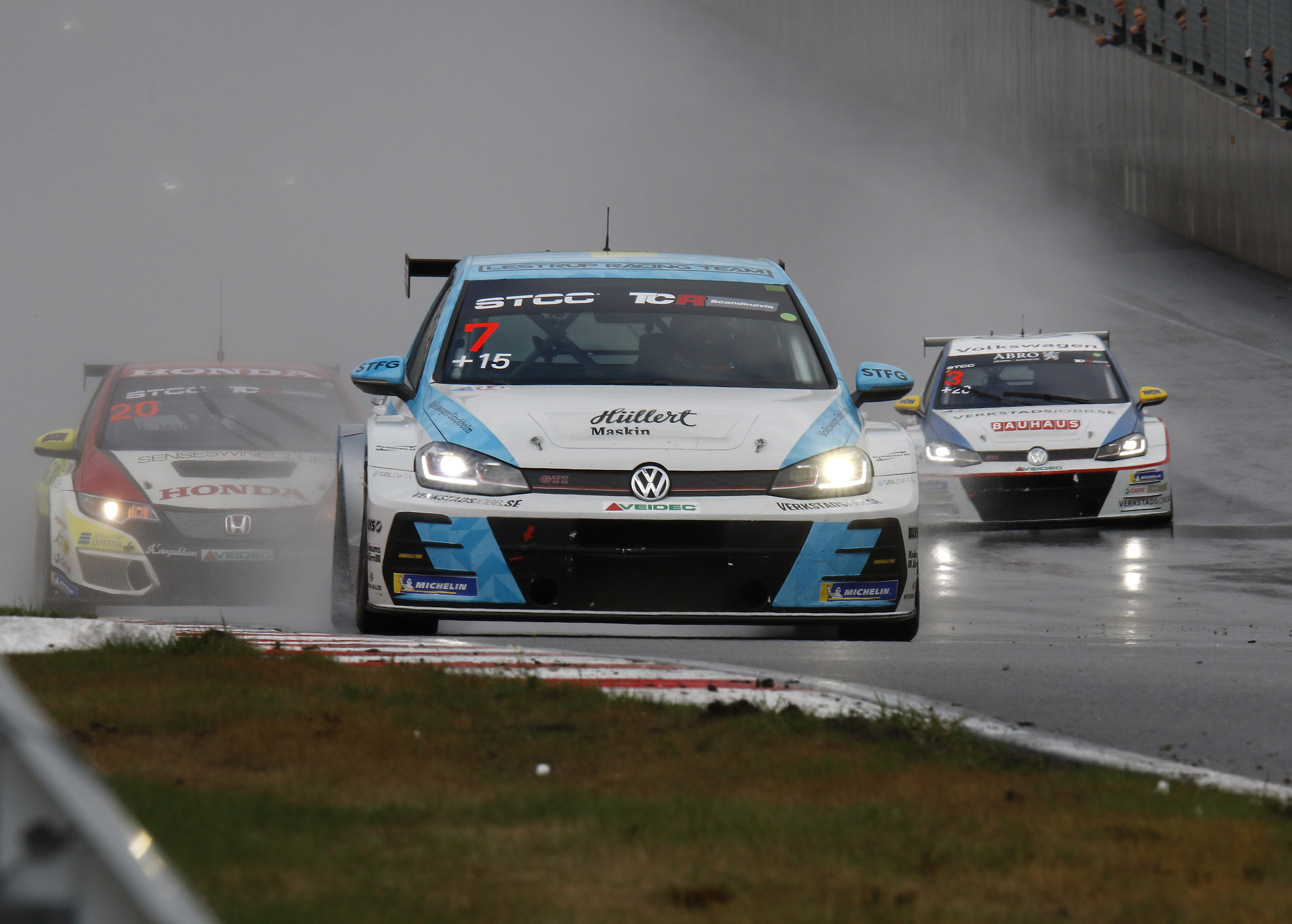
Andreas Wernersson, Tobias Brink's teammate, placed third in the Drivers' championship.

The 2019 TCR Scandinavia Touring Car Championship was the ninth overall season of the Scandinavian Touring Car Championship season, the third under the internationally recognised TCR formula, and the first with its new promoter. The season started at Ring Knutstorp on 4 May and ended at Mantorp Park on 5 October, after six rounds across Sweden and Denmark.

During the off-season, the national governing body of motorsport in Sweden, Svenska Bilsportförbundet (SBF), was informed on 6 February 2019 that promotor Scandinavian touringcar corporation AB, which was responsible for the promotion of the Scandinavian Touring Car Championship, declared bankruptcy. TCR Scandinavian Series AB, in cooperation with the circuits and SBF, took over as promoter of the STCC-series.

== Teams and drivers ==
Team	Car	No.	Drivers	Rounds
(Sweden) / PWR Racing (Note: Car No. 2 and 19 entered as PWR Racing and car No. 59 entered as Poker Racing for Charity.); (Sweden) / Poker Racing for Charity	CUPRA León TCR	2	(Sweden) Robert Dahlgren	All
(Sweden) / PWR Racing; (Sweden) / Poker Racing for Charity	CUPRA León TCR	19	(Sweden) Mikaela Åhlin-Kottulinsky	All
(Sweden) / PWR Racing; (Sweden) / Poker Racing for Charity	CUPRA León TCR	37	(Sweden) Daniel Haglöf	7
(Sweden) / PWR Racing; (Sweden) / Poker Racing for Charity	CUPRA León TCR	59	(Sweden) Peter "Poker" Wallenberg	1−5, 7
(Sweden) Brovallen Design	Audi RS3 LMS TCR	3	(Estonia) Andre Kiil	1−2
(Sweden) Brovallen Design	Audi RS3 LMS TCR	23	(Sweden) Alex Andersson	4
(Sweden) Brovallen Design	Audi RS3 LMS TCR	99	(Sweden) Tobias Johansson	5
(Sweden) Brink Motorsport	Audi RS3 LMS TCR	4	(Sweden) Andreas Wernersson	All
(Sweden) Brink Motorsport	Audi RS3 LMS TCR	51	(Sweden) Hannes Morin	All
(Sweden) Brink Motorsport	Audi RS3 LMS TCR	71	(Sweden) Tobias Brink	All
(Denmark) Massive Motorsport	Honda Civic Type R TCR (FK8)	5	(Denmark) Casper Elgaard	6
(Denmark) Insight Racing	Honda Civic Type R TCR (FK2)	6	(Denmark) Jonas Lynge	2, 4
(Denmark) Insight Racing	Alfa Romeo Giulietta Veloce TCR	10	(Norway) Kristian Sætheren	6-7
(Denmark) Insight Racing	Alfa Romeo Giulietta TCR	11	(Denmark) Louise Frost	1−2, 4−5
(Denmark) Insight Racing	Alfa Romeo Giulietta TCR	11	(Denmark) Martin Jensen	6
(Denmark) Madbull Racing	SEAT León TCR	7	(Denmark) Kim Lund	2, 6
Team Hyundai Denmark	Hyundai i30 N TCR	8	(Denmark) Marco Gersager	6
(Sweden) Micke Kågered Racing	Volkswagen Golf GTI TCR	17	(Sweden) Tomas Engström	1−2, 4−5, 7
(Sweden) Micke Kågered Racing	Volkswagen Golf GTI TCR	21	(Sweden) Andreas Ahlberg	All
Honda Racing Sweden	Honda Civic TCR (FK2)	20	(Sweden) Mattias Andersson	All
(Sweden) Experion Racing Team	Volkswagen Golf GTI TCR	22	(Sweden) Albin Wärnelöv	1−2, 4−7
(Italy) Target Competition	Hyundai i30 N TCR	26	(Sweden) Jessica Bäckman	2

== Calendar ==
On 31 October 2018, a provisional calendar was announced which increased the events from six events to seven. Five events were confirmed with "midnight sun" race confirmed at the Skellefteå Drive Centre which will make its début. Anderstorp Raceway was confirmed as the second round of the championship on 8 November 2018. Jyllands-Ringen in Denmark was added to the calendar as the sixth round on 26 November 2018. The series last visited Denmark during the 2012 season at the same venue. With the calendar changes the Rudskogen circuit in Norway was dropped from the calendar.

=== Race calendar and results ===
Round		Circuit	Location	Date	Pole position	Fastest lap	Race winner	Winning team
1	R1	(Sweden) Ring Knutstorp	Kågeröd, Skåne	3–4 May	(Sweden) Mikaela Åhlin-Kottulinsky	(Sweden) Mikaela Åhlin-Kottulinsky	(Sweden) Mikaela Åhlin-Kottulinsky	(Sweden) PWR Racing
1	R2	(Sweden) Ring Knutstorp	Kågeröd, Skåne	3–4 May		(Sweden) Robert Dahlgren	(Sweden) Andreas Wernersson	(Sweden) Brink Motorsport
2	R1	(Sweden) Anderstorp Raceway	Anderstorp, Jönköping	1–2 June	(Sweden) Robert Dahlgren	(Sweden) Robert Dahlgren	(Sweden) Robert Dahlgren	(Sweden) PWR Racing
2	R2	(Sweden) Anderstorp Raceway	Anderstorp, Jönköping	1–2 June		(Sweden) Tobias Brink	(Sweden) Andreas Ahlberg	(Sweden) Micke Kågered Racing
3	R1	(Sweden) Skellefteå Drive Centre	Skellefteå, Västerbotten	14–15 June	(Sweden) Andreas Wernersson	(Sweden) Robert Dahlgren	(Sweden) Andreas Wernersson	(Sweden) Brink Motorsport
3	R2	(Sweden) Skellefteå Drive Centre	Skellefteå, Västerbotten	14–15 June		(Sweden) Andreas Wernersson	(Sweden) Robert Dahlgren	(Sweden) PWR Racing
4	R1	(Sweden) Falkenbergs Motorbana	Bergagård, Halland	13–14 July	(Sweden) Robert Dahlgren	(Sweden) Robert Dahlgren	(Sweden) Tobias Brink	(Sweden) Brink Motorsport
4	R2	(Sweden) Falkenbergs Motorbana	Bergagård, Halland	13–14 July		(Sweden) Robert Dahlgren	(Sweden) Andreas Wernersson	(Sweden) Brink Motorsport
5	R1	(Sweden) Karlskoga Motorstadion	Karlskoga, Örebro	17–18 August	(Sweden) Robert Dahlgren	(Sweden) Mattias Andersson	(Sweden) Mattias Andersson	Honda Racing Sweden
5	R2	(Sweden) Karlskoga Motorstadion	Karlskoga, Örebro	17–18 August		(Sweden) Mikaela Åhlin-Kottulinsky	(Sweden) Tobias Brink	(Sweden) Brink Motorsport
6	R1	(Denmark) Jyllands-Ringen	Silkeborg	7–8 September	(Sweden) Robert Dahlgren	(Sweden) Robert Dahlgren	(Sweden) Robert Dahlgren	(Sweden) PWR Racing
6	R2	(Denmark) Jyllands-Ringen	Silkeborg	7–8 September		(Sweden) Robert Dahlgren	(Sweden) Andreas Ahlberg	(Sweden) Micke Kågered Racing
7	R1	(Sweden) Mantorp Park	Mantorp, Östergötland	4–5 October	(Sweden) Tobias Brink	(Sweden) Tobias Brink	(Sweden) Mattias Andersson	Honda Racing Sweden
7	R2	(Sweden) Mantorp Park	Mantorp, Östergötland	4–5 October		(Sweden) Andreas Wernersson	(Sweden) Andreas Wernersson	(Sweden) Brink Motorsport

== Championship standings ==
=== Drivers' Championship ===
Pos	Driver	KNU (Sweden)		AND (Sweden)		SKE (Sweden)		FAL (Sweden)		GEL (Sweden)		JYL (Denmark)		MAN (Sweden)		Pts
Pos	Driver	RD1	RD2	RD1	RD2	RD1	RD2	RD1	RD2	RD1	RD2	RD1	RD2	RD1	RD2	Pts
1	(Sweden) Robert Dahlgren	2^{4}	6	**1**^{1}	5	2^{2}	1	**2**^{1}	3	**2**^{1}	Ret	**1**^{1}	3	3^{2}	4	252
2	(Sweden) Tobias Brink	3^{3}	4	3^{5}	2	5^{5}	5	1^{2}	4	5	1	2^{3}	2	**2**^{1}	Ret	223
3	(Sweden) Andreas Wernersson	5^{5}	1	2^{2}	7	**1**^{1}	3	5	1	9	4	3^{4}	6	5	1	218
4	(Sweden) Andreas Ahlberg	4^{2}	2	6	1	3^{3}	4	6^{5}	5	3^{3}	2	4^{5}	1	7	11	196
5	(Sweden) Mattias Andersson	7	3	4^{3}	6	6	8	4^{4}	2	1^{2}	5	8	4	1^{3}	2	189
6	(Sweden) Mikaela Åhlin-Kottulinsky	**1**^{1}	Ret	5^{4}	10	4	2	3^{3}	7	4^{5}	3	6	5	6^{5}	3	167
7	(Sweden) Tomas Engström	6	5	12	4			7	6	8^{4}	Ret			9	6	60
8	(Sweden) Hannes Morin	8	7	13	12	Ret^{4}	6	9	8	7	7	7	10	8	5	59
9	(Sweden) Albin Wärnelöv	Ret	9	8	8			8	12	6	6	DSQ	8	10	7	41
10	(Sweden) Peter "Poker" Wallenberg	9	8	11	11	7	7	12	10	11	9			12	10	22
11	(Sweden) Jessica Bäckman			7	3											21
12	(Sweden) Daniel Haglöf													4^{4}	9	16
13	(Denmark) Casper Elgaard											5^{2}	DSQ			14
14	(Norway) Kristian Sætheren											9	7	11	8	8
15	(Denmark) Jonas Lynge			9	9			10	9							7
16	(Sweden) Tobias Johansson									10	8					5
17	(Denmark) Louise Frost	10	Ret	10	13			11	13	DNS	10					3
18	(Denmark) Marco Gersager											11	DNS			2
19	(Denmark) Martin Jensen											10	Ret			1
20	(Estonia) Andre Kiil	Ret	DNS													0
21	(Denmark) Kim Lund			14	14											0
22	(Sweden) Alex Andersson							13	11							0

Championship points were awarded on the results of each race at each event as follows:

Position	**1st**	**2nd**	**3rd**	**4th**	**5th**	**6th**	**7th**	**8th**	**9th**	**10th**
Race	25	18	15	12	10	8	6	4	2	1
Qualifying (Race 1)	5	4	3	2	1					

Colour	Result
Gold	Winner
Silver	Second place
Bronze	Third place
Green	Points classification
Blue	Non-points classification
Blue	Non-classified finish (NC)
Purple	Retired, not classified (Ret)
Red	Did not qualify (DNQ)
Red	Did not pre-qualify (DNPQ)
Black	Disqualified (DSQ)
White	Did not start (DNS)
White	Withdrew (WD)
White	Race cancelled (C)
Blank	Did not practice (DNP)
Blank	Did not arrive (DNA)
Blank	Excluded (EX)

**Bold** – Pole
Italics – Fastest Lap

=== Teams' Championship ===
Pos.	Team	KNU (Sweden)		AND (Sweden)		SKE (Sweden)		FAL (Sweden)		GEL (Sweden)		JYL (Denmark)		MAN (Sweden)		Pts
Pos.	Team	RD1	RD2	RD1	RD2	RD1	RD2	RD1	RD2	RD1	RD2	RD1	RD2	RD1	RD2	Pts
1	(Sweden) Brink Motorsport	3	1	2	2	1	3	1	1	5	1	2	2	2	1	443
1	(Sweden) Brink Motorsport	5	4	3	7	5	5	5	4	7	4	3	6	5	5	443
2	(Sweden) PWR Racing - SEAT Dealer Team	1	6	1	5	2	1	2	3	2	3	1	3	3	3	414
2	(Sweden) PWR Racing - SEAT Dealer Team	2	Ret	5	10	4	2	3	7	4	Ret	6	5	6	4	414
3	(Sweden) Micke Kågered Racing	4	2	6	1	3	4	6	5	3	2	4	1	7	6	263
3	(Sweden) Micke Kågered Racing	6	5	12	4			7	6	8	Ret			9	11	263
4	Honda Racing Sweden	7	3	4	6	6	8	4	2	1	5	8	4	1	2	193
5	(Sweden) Experion Racing	Ret	9	8	8			8	12	6	6	DSQ	8	10	7	46
6	(Denmark) Insight Racing	10	Ret	9	9			10	9	DNS	10	9	7	11	8	35
6	(Denmark) Insight Racing			10	13			11	13			10	Ret			35
7	(Sweden) Poker Racing for Charity	9	8	11	11	7	7	12	10	11	9			12	10	33
8	(Sweden) SEAT Dealer Team - PWR Racing													4	9	24
9	(Italy) Target Competition			7	3											21
10	(Denmark) Massive Motorsport											5	DSQ			14
11	(Sweden) Brovallen Design	Ret	DNS					13	11	10	8					9
12	Team Hyundai Denmark											11	DNS			3
13	(Denmark) Madbull Racing			14	14											0

Colour	Result
Gold	Winner
Silver	Second place
Bronze	Third place
Green	Points classification
Blue	Non-points classification
Blue	Non-classified finish (NC)
Purple	Retired, not classified (Ret)
Red	Did not qualify (DNQ)
Red	Did not pre-qualify (DNPQ)
Black	Disqualified (DSQ)
White	Did not start (DNS)
White	Withdrew (WD)
White	Race cancelled (C)
Blank	Did not practice (DNP)
Blank	Did not arrive (DNA)
Blank	Excluded (EX)

**Bold** – Pole
Italics – Fastest Lap
