= Jacob Palmstierna =

Swedish banker (1934– 2013)

Friherre Carl Jacob Palmstierna (28 April 1934 – 22 April 2013) was a Swedish banker. He was CEO of Skandinaviska Enskilda Banken (SEB) from 1976 to 1989.

== Early life ==
Palmstierna was born on 28 April 1934 in Lund, Sweden, the son of Hovjägmästare, Friherre Carl Palmstierna and his wife Anne-Marie (née von Essen). He grew up on the family estate of Maltesholm Castle. His grandmother Ruth von Essen was the youngest daughter of André Oscar Wallenberg, the founder of Stockholms Enskilda Bank (SEB) (the forerunner of the Skandinaviska Enskilda Banken AB) and Palmstierna's employer for 30 years, and where he was CEO for 13 years. Palmstierna passed studentexamen in Sigtuna in 1953 and graduated from the Wharton School of the University of Pennsylvania in Philadelphia in 1957. In 1959, Palmstierna graduated from the Stockholm School of Economics and the year after he was hired by Stockholms Enskilda Bank (SEB).

== Career ==
Palmstierna was appointed Deputy Bank Director in 1965 and Bank Director in 1968. Palmstierna was appointed Deputy CEO of Stockholms Enskilda Bank in 1969, and of the Skandinaviska Enskilda Banken AB (SEB) in 1972. He was then appointed CEO of Skandinaviska Enskilda Banken AB in 1976.

On 22 July 1989, Svenska Dagbladet published the first in a series of articles, which dealt with the circumstances surrounding the villa attached to his post as CEO of SEB, which Palmstierna had rented from the bank for ten years, and which was to develop into the so-called Palmstierna affair. The affair attracted a lot of attention and became a serial in the media for several months. Upon Palmstierna's entry, as CEO of SEB, the bank had bought his villa in Djursholm and rented it to him for SEK 3,000 per month. At that time, the rental amount was considered extremely advantageous, as it corresponded to the cost of a two-room apartment in the outskirts of Stockholm, which had prompted the Swedish Tax Agency to investigate the arrangement. Then, in an interview with the newspaper, Palmstierna expressed that the rent for the villa was marketable, that is, perfectly normal, escalated the affair. It reached a peak, when a few days later it turned out that the Palmstierna leased a villa in the same area for a monthly rent of SEK 30,000. On 21 September 1989, the police conducted a house search at the Palmstierna's office. His confidence as a banker was considered to be exhausted and he received no support or defense from the Wallenberg family or the bank's board, which led him to submit his resignation application on 14 November 1989. Palmstierna felt betrayed by the Wallenberg family in connection with the affair, the heir Peter Wallenberg Sr. in particular. In his outspoken memoirs from 2010, he speculates whether this was due to conflicts they had within the company group. Palmstierna himself had stood closest to the father Marcus Wallenberg Jr., with whom his son Peter had a complicated relationship with.

In the early 1990s, Björn Wahlström had been assigned the task of saving the state-owned Nordbanken. Wahlström became chairman, Palmstierna deputy. They brought in Hans Dalborg as CEO and together they made a cleaning effort that earned the taxpayers several billions. Palmstierna were crucial to the bank's metamorphosis. He was the one with the most banking experience. As chairman between 1992 and 2000, he then co-founded the mergers in Norway, Denmark and Finland, which became today's Nordea, the largest bank in the Nordic countries.

He was a board deputy of AB Nordströms linbanor and chairman of the board of Loomis AB (from 2007), Linderödsåsens Kraft AB, Piren AB, Catena, Siemens-Elema AB, VBB AB and some of its subsidiaries. Palmstierna was a board member of Företagskapital AB, Goodyear Svenska AB, Rank Xerox AB, Orkla ind A/S, AB Electrolux, Saléninvest AB, AB Nymölla, Kopparfors AB, Arvid Nordqvist HAB, Stora Kopparbergs Bergslags AB, A Johnson & Co HAB, NCC AB, Tetra Laval, ICB Shipping, Avesta Sheffield, Burenstam & Partners AB, Maltesholms Förvaltnings AB, Industrial and Financial Systems (IFS) AB, Skåneskogens Utvecklings AB, Skandinaviska Enskilda Banken AB (SEB) and some of SEB's foreign subsidiaries.

He was also treasurer of the Stockholm School of Economics Association (Handelshögskoleföreningen) and a member of the Stockholm School of Economics Board of Directors (Handelshögskolan i Stockholms direktion). Palmstierna was chairman of the German-Swedish Chamber of Commerce.

== Personal life ==
Palmstierna was married five times. In 1960, he married Anna Hamilton (born 1935). In 1966, he married Catharina von Knorring, the daughter of Holger von Knorring and Jeanne-Marie von Troil. In 1981, he married Caroline Hebbe (born 1930). In 1989, he married Annika Wallenberg, the daughter of Stig Jansson and Karin (née MasOlle). He met his fifth and last wife, Hanne, in the late 1970s. They decided to separate from their partners to live together, but changed their minds shortly thereafter and did not see each other for 13 years, before they took up the relationship again.

At the age of 32, in 1966, Palmstierna took over the family estate of Maltesholm Castle outside Kristianstad. His son Niclas took over the castle after his father's death.

== Awards ==
- Honorary Doctor of Business, Stockholm School of Economics (Hon. D.B) (1989)
- SSE Research Award, Stockholm School of Economics Institute for Research (1996)

== Bibliography ==
- Palmstierna, Jacob (2008). Jacobs stege: triumfer och nederlag i en bankmans liv (in Swedish). Stockholm: Ekerlid. ISBN 9789170920882. SELIBR 11197580.
- Palmstierna, Jacob; Persson, Sven (2009). Egendomspraktikan: om konsten att ärva, driva och vidareutveckla en stor egendom (in Swedish). Stockholm: Ekerlid. ISBN 9789170921223. SELIBR 11594517.

Business positions
Preceded by Lars-Erik Thunholm	CEO of Skandinaviska Enskilda Banken (SEB); 1976–1989	Succeeded by Bo Ramfors
