= Börje Ekholm =

Swedish-American business executive (born 1963)

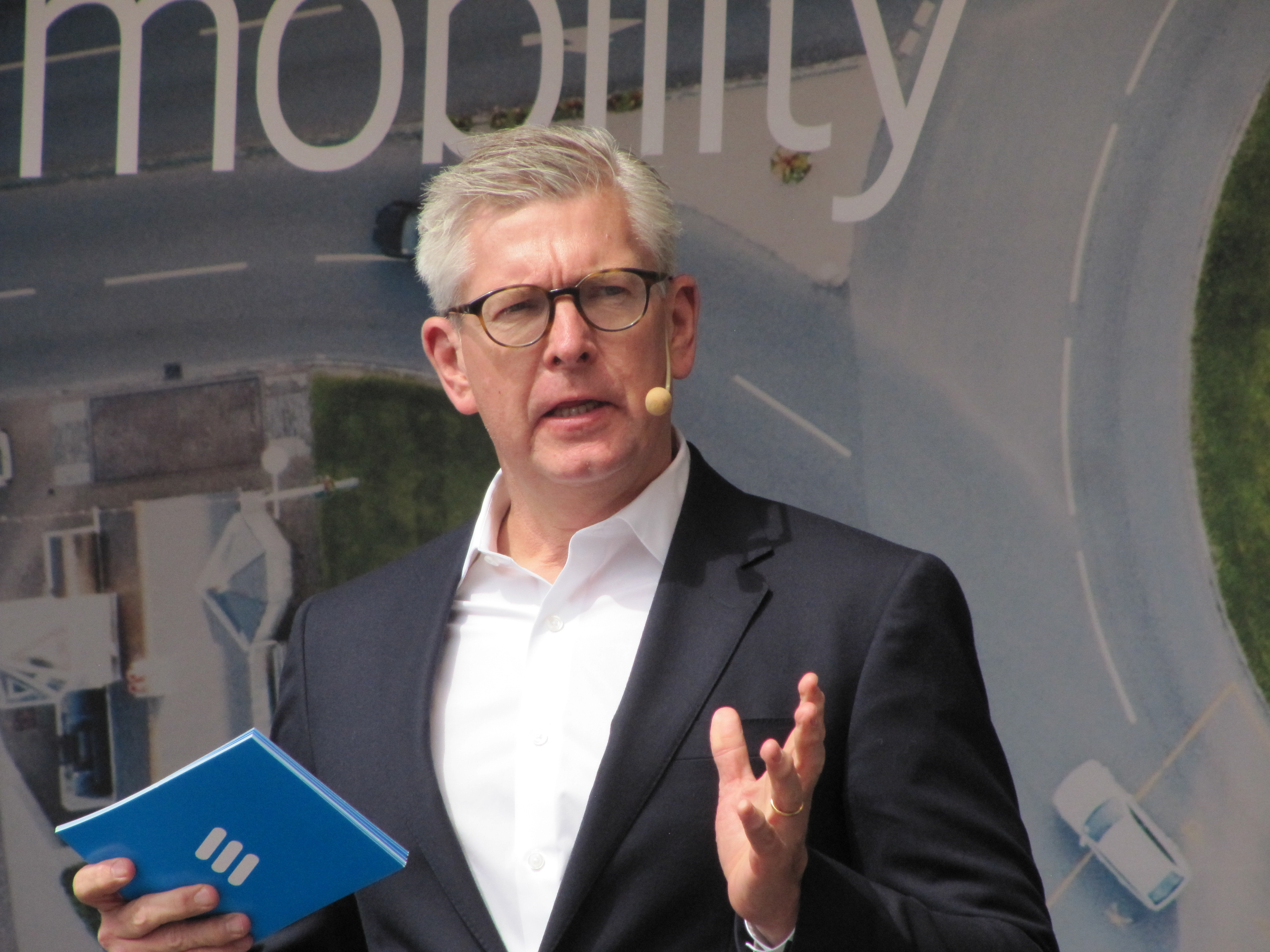
- Ekholm in 2019
- Born: January 21, 1963 (age 63); Kullings-Skövde parish, Vårgårda Municipality, Sweden
- Citizenship: Sweden; United States
- Education: Royal Institute of Technology (MSc); INSEAD (MBA)
- Occupation: Business executive
- Title: CEO, Ericsson
- Term: January 2017–2026
- Predecessor: Hans Vestberg
- Children: 4

Erik Börje Ekholm (born January 21, 1963) is a Swedish-American business executive.

== Early life ==
Börje Ekholm was born on January 21, 1963 in Kullings-Skövde parish, Vårgårda Municipality, Sweden. He grew up in Edsbruk, where he was educated at the nearby Västerviks gymnasium. He graduated in 1988 with an MSc in Electrical Engineering from KTH Royal Institute of Technology in Stockholm, undertook exchange studies in Boston, and holds a Master of Business Administration degree from INSEAD.

== Career ==
Ekholm started his career as a consultant for McKinsey from 1988 to 1992, before joining the holding company controlled by the Wallenberg family, Investor AB, where he worked in corporate finance. Three years later he was assigned to build the newly formed venture capital business within the company called Novare Kapital and becoming Investor AB's deputy chief executive officer in 2000. In 2005, he replaced Marcus Wallenberg as CEO of the firm. In 2015, he was reassigned to lead Investor AB's subsidiary Patricia Industries as CEO and remained in the role until early 2017.

In January 2017, Ekholm succeeded Hans Vestberg as CEO of Ericsson. At the time of his appointment, Investor AB was Ericsson's biggest shareholder. He has also been a board member of Ericsson since 2006.

He sits on the board of Trimble and previously sat on the boards of several of Investor AB's portfolio companies, including Nasdaq OMX, of which he is a former chairman. He chaired the board of WM-data from 2005 until its acquisition by LogicaCMG. In 2008 he joined the board of his alma mater KTH. Two years later he became its chairman. Also that year, he was elected as member of the Swedish Academy of Engineering Sciences. From 2015 to 2022, he was on the board of Alibaba Group.

In 2015, he was a recipient of H. M. The King's Medal of the 12th size in the Order of the Seraphim ribbon for his contributions to Swedish business.

In June 2026 it was announced that Ekholm will step down as CEO of Ericsson from September 30, 2026. He remained in an advisory position of his successor Per Narvinger until June 15, 2027.

== Personal life ==
Ekholm is married to Madeline with whom he has four children, including a pair of twins. He is a dual citizen of Sweden and the United States.
