= Marc Wallenberg =

Swedish banker and business manager

Marc Wallenberg RVO
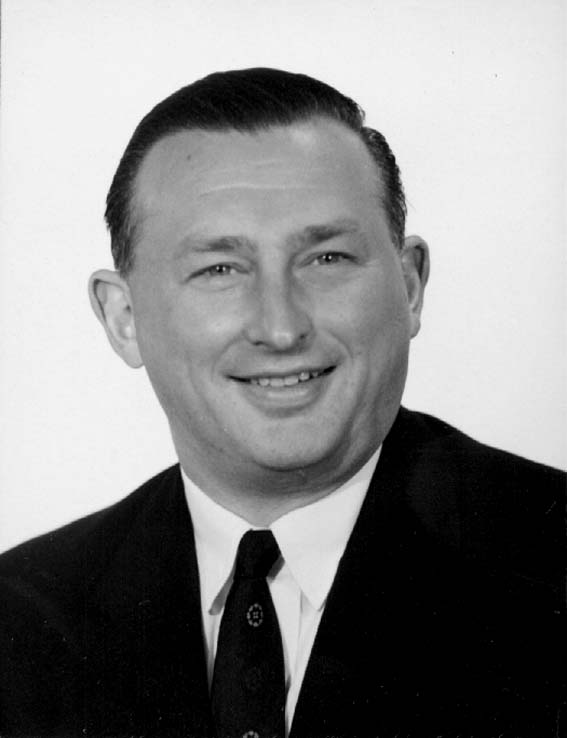
- Born: 28 June 1924; London, United Kingdom
- Died: 19 November 1971 (aged 47); Lake Orlången, Sweden
- Education: Harvard Business School
- Occupation: Banker
- Spouse: Olga Wehtje (m. 1955–1971)
- Children: Marcus (born 1956); Axel (1958–2011); Mariana (born 1965); Caroline (born 1968)
- Parent(s): Marcus Wallenberg; Dorothy Mackay
- Relatives: Peter Wallenberg (brother); Jacob Wallenberg (uncle); Marcus Wallenberg (grandfather)
- Awards: Order of Vasa

Marc "Boy-boy" Wallenberg RVO (28 June 1924 – 19 November 1971) was a Swedish banker and business manager. A member of the prominent Wallenberg family, Marc Wallenberg was CEO of Stockholms Enskilda Bank until his death in 1971.

== Early life ==
Wallenberg was born in London, United Kingdom, the eldest son of Swedish banker Marcus Wallenberg (1899–1982) and Dorothy Mackay (1900–1984) from Scotland. He was the brother of Peter Wallenberg (1926–2015) and Ann-Mari Wallenberg (born 1929). Wallenberg passed studentexamen in 1943 and graduated from Harvard Business School in 1949 before bank studies in New York City, Geneva, Paris, London and Düsseldorf from 1949 to 1952, all according to his father's plan.

== Career ==
Wallenberg became deputy director of the family bank Stockholms Enskilda Bank in 1953 and became director and member of its board two years later. In 1956 he became vice CEO and in 1958 he became CEO.

He was a board member of AB Svenska järnvägsverkstäderna, and he became vice chairman of the Swedish Bankers' Association (Svenska Bankföreningen) in 1959 and its chairman in 1961. Wallenberg was appointed by the School of Economics and Business as a member of the Stockholm School of Economics Board of Directors which is Stockholm School of Economics highest executive agency, where he was treasurer from 1965 to 1971. At the time of his death in 1971, Wallenberg was on the boards of 67 companies.

== Personal life ==
In 1955 he married Olga Wehtje (born 1930), the daughter of director Walter Wehtje and Gurli Bergström. They had four children; Marcus (born 1956), Axel (1958–2011), Mariana (born 1965, married Risberg) and Caroline (born 1968, married Ankarcrona).

== Death ==
On Thursday, 18 November 1971, the family bank held an ordinary board meeting. In the morning, Wallenberg flew from Värnamo, where he had participated in a corporate debate the day before. At the debate, he was asked why the Wallenberg Group had started construction of a new pulp mill in Hyltebruk, despite it not yet having been authorized. His answer to the question was rash, responding that he would rather be prosecuted for an environmental crime than be forced to pay damages to a mass buyer for breach of contract. The statement was big news in the press and he was criticized by his father at the board meeting. In the evening, he left a reception at the Italian Embassy and he did not come home for the night. The next day his car was found at Lake Orlången in Huddinge. Jacob Palmstierna and Peder Bonde, both Deputy CEOs of SEB, arrived at the site at 12 o'clock and were the first to see Wallenberg's dead body near his car and could confirm his identity. Wallenberg had taken his own life using a hunting rifle.

It cannot be determined what influence stress due to the bank merger might have had on his decision to commit suicide. His workload was great and the expectations and pressure on him were no less. Marcus Wallenberg considered that his son's prolonged cold and medication with sulfa drugs might have been fatal. Another reason is thought to be depression. In his memoirs, Lars-Erik Thunholm testified that Marc Wallenberg's suicide was due to the fact that he, like his uncle Jacob Wallenberg, was against the merger with Skandinaviska Banken, contrary to his father's intentions to go ahead with the agreement. To confront his father with his idea was impossible for Marc and he chose suicide. Although it is likely that Wallenberg died on 18 November, the official death day was set to 19 November 1971, the day when he was found dead. The day the family chose to indicate on his tombstone is, however, 18 November. The 19 November, is dynasty founder André Oscar Wallenberg's birthday, an important day for the family, which has always been celebrated.

== Awards and decorations ==
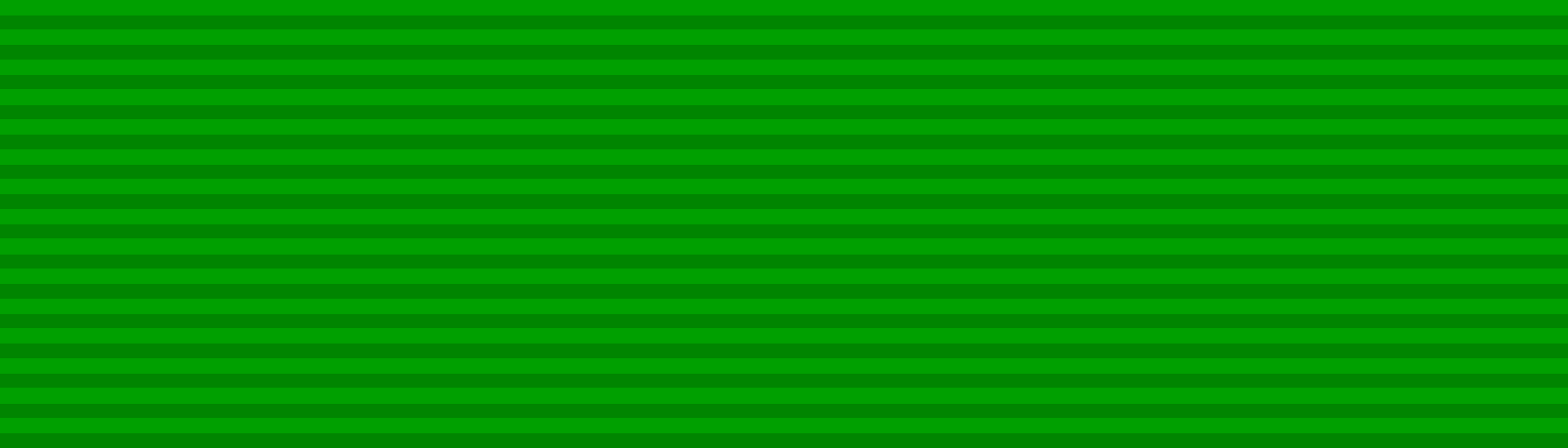
- (Sweden) Knight of the Order of Vasa (1961)

Business positions
Preceded by Marcus Wallenberg	CEO of Stockholms Enskilda Bank (SEB); 1958–1971	Succeeded by Hans Munck af Rosenschöld
