= Lundsbergs boarding school =

Independent school in Värmland, Sweden

Coordinates: 59.4982°N 14.1627°E

Lundsberg Boarding School
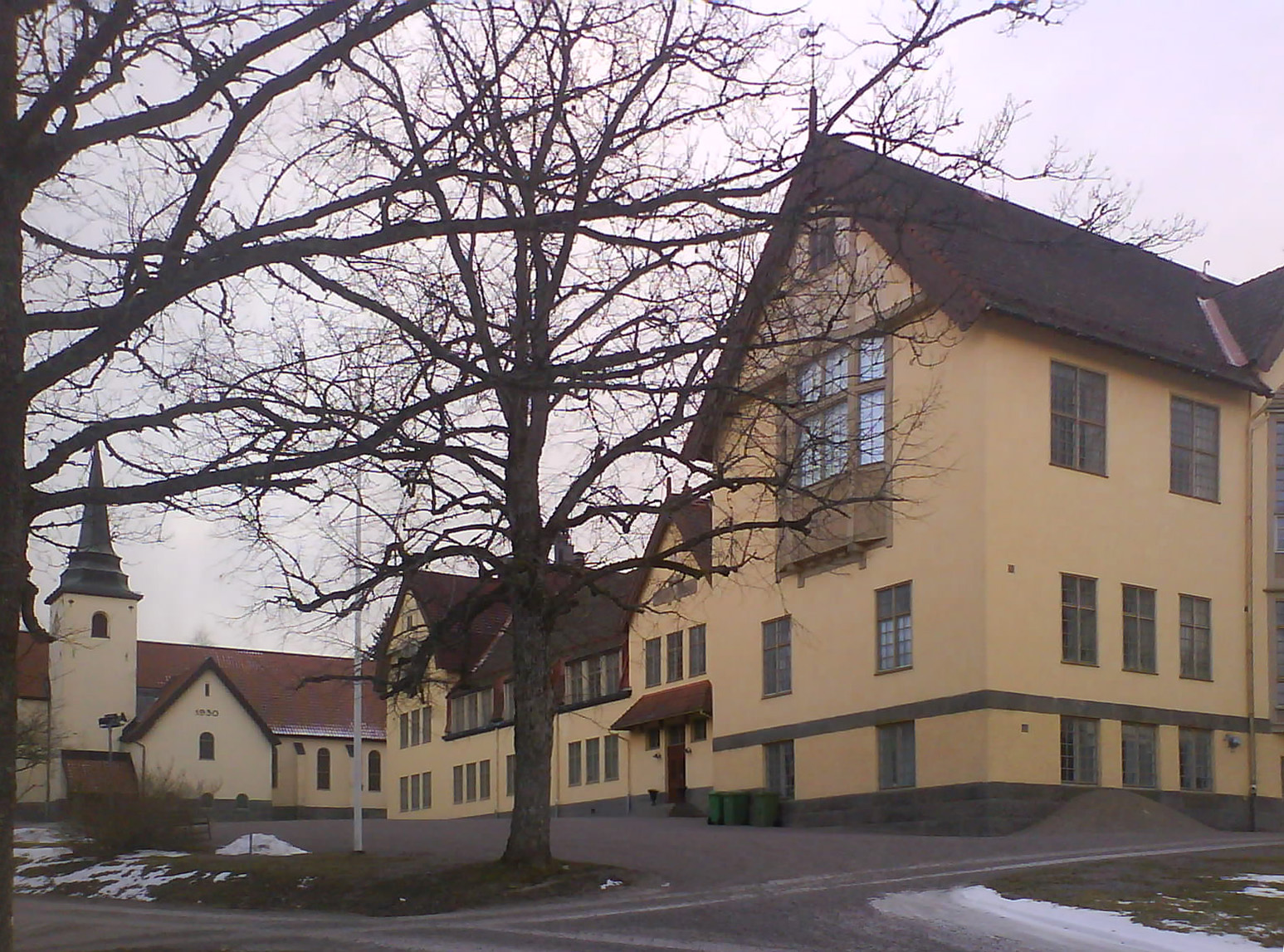
- Main building

Information
- Type: Independent boarding school
- Motto: Mens sana in corpore sano
- Established: 30 January 1896
- Founder: William Olsson
- Gender: Coeducational
- Age: 13 to 19
- Enrolment: ~220
- Houses: 6 active
- Colour
- Publication: Lundsbergaren
- Former pupils: Lundsbergare / Lundsbergians
- School song: Lundsbergssången
- Website: www.lundsbergsskola.se

Lundsberg Boarding School (Swedish: Lundsbergs skola) is an independent boarding school in Storfors Municipality, Sweden. Founded in 1896 and inspired by traditional English boarding schools, it is operated by the Lundsberg School Foundation (Stiftelsen Lundsbergs skola) and is known for its conservative environment.

Formerly designated as a state-supported national boarding school (riksinternat) until the status was phased out in 2014, the school enrols around 220 secondary school students, including both boarders and day pupils. Education is publicly funded through the Swedish school voucher system (skolpeng), while annual boarding and lodging fees are 454,000 SEK.

== History ==
Lundsbergs Boarding School was founded by the businessman William Olsson 30 January 1896. The school at that time was characterized of the ideals to form the future leaders of the country via religious studies in a Spartan environment.

The school commenced in Lundsberg's Herrgård. However, as the student number rose more student housing, staff buildings, and sport facilities were built. The Main Building was constructed 1906-1907 under the drawings of the architect Erik Lallerstedts. The current sports field was officially opened 1923 by Crown Prince Gustaf Adolf of Sweden, Duke of Skåne.

At 1907 the school, which was previously owned by Lundsbergs AB, was handed over to the Lundsbergs School Foundation. Today, the committee of the foundation consists of former students, staff, and legal guardians of current pupils.

== School church ==
The school church was built following a donation and was designed by architect Bror Almquist. Prince Gustaf Adolf laid the foundation stone on 6 June 1929, and Diocesan Bishop J.A. Eklund blessed the site. Connected to the main school building, the church opened on 5 October 1930.

The altar is made of green marble, and the reredos was designed by artist and alumnus Peder Jensen. All Swedish princes who had graduated from the school by the time of the church's completion jointly donated a stained-glass window designed by Sigvard Bernadotte. The school museum is located in the church basement.

The church is used for choir practice, services, morning assemblies, and music and theatre classes. Each year, four students (two girls and two boys) are selected as churchwardens, and four boys are chosen as bell ringers.

== Boarding houses ==
Lundsberg Boarding School has eight houses, six of which are currently active. Each house has its own facilities and traditions, and they compete against one another in various inter-house events. Around 220 students are currently enrolled at the school, with the vast majority being boarders.

The houses are:

- Berga: Opened in 1924. In 1942, Berga became the Principal's House and its students were relocated to Skogshult.
- Björke: Completed in 1899 as a boys' house. It temporarily became co-educational in 2014 during renovations at Skogshult before returning to a boys-only house.
- Forest Hill: Completed in 1898 as the second house built on campus.
- Lilla Hill: Opened in 2019 as an extension of Forest Hill.
- Gransäter: Completed in 1902. It is a boys' house whose alumni include Prince Gustaf Adolf (1918–1924) and Prince Sigvard Bernadotte (1918–1926).
- Herrgården: Lundsberg's oldest house, where the school opened in 1896. Prince Bertil, Duke of Halland, lived here from 1926 to 1930. It is currently a girls' house.
- Klätten: Opened by Prince Bertil in 1953 as a girls' house, though it briefly operated as co-educational.
- Skogshult: Completed in 1913 as a boys' house and later converted to a girls' house. Its alumni include Prince Carl Philip, who lived there from 1996 to 1999.

== Activities ==
=== Lundsbergaren ===
Lundsbergaren, founded in 1910, is Sweden's oldest school newspaper. Published four times a year, it is edited by a student editorial team. The newspaper features news from the school, sports results, interviews with staff, and contributions from the alumni association, FGL. The publication is subject to editorial review by school staff and FGL to ensure compliance with school policies.

=== Sports ===
Sports and health play a central role at Lundsberg, reflected in the school's motto Mens sana in corpore sano ("A healthy mind in a healthy body"). The campus features various athletic facilities, and inter-house competitions take place throughout the school year.

Lundsberg competes against other private and boarding schools in the SIPSI athletic association, alongside institutions such as Enskilda gymnasiet, Sigtunaskolan Humanistiska Läroverket, and Viktor Rydberg Gymnasium. In 2010, the Gant Rowing Race was established as an annual rowing competition between Lundsberg and Sigtunaskolan Humanistiska Läroverket.

=== Arts ===
Music has been part of the school's extracurricular program since the construction of the school church, and the school maintains both a student choir and a staff choir. Theatre activities are also hosted at the school. Notable acting alumni include Johan Rabaeus and Sven Lindberg.

== Controversy ==
Public allegations of bullying emerged in 2011 following anonymous reports to the media and the Swedish Schools Inspectorate. An investigation by The Guardian highlighted a long-standing pattern of abuse, with researchers suggesting that changed social dynamics among newer student groups had brought the issue into public view.

On 28 August 2013, the Swedish Schools Inspectorate temporarily revoked the school's operating license for six months following repeated reports of hazing, including an incident where students were burned with hot irons. The decision led to the immediate dismissal of the headmaster and the resignation of the governing board. Prior to the closure, the Inspectorate had threatened a fine of 500,000 SEK. On 6 September 2013, the decision was stayed on appeal, allowing the school to reopen.

In late 2025, four students were convicted of assaulting schoolmates and sentenced to community service.

== Alumni ==
Famous Alumni include:

- Prince Bertil
- Prince Gustaf Adolf
- Prince Carl Philip
- Boris Hagelin
- Ian Wachtmeister
- Sigvard Bernadotte (designed the church window at the school)
- Carl Johan Bernadotte
- Sven Lindberg, actor
- Johan Rabeus, actor
- Christian von Koenigsegg
- Carl Fredrik Reuterswärd
- Carl Gustaf von Rosen
- Peder Wallenberg
- Tage William-Olsson

== Principals ==
Lundsberg School has had the following principals since its inception:

- 1896–1922: Frits Danielsson
- 1922–1942: Einar Gauffin
- 1942–1960: Martin Lindström
- 1960–1986: Per Henningsson
- 1986–1988: Göran Malmeström
- 1988–1995: Hans G. Helén
- 1995–1999: Anders Lundin
- 1999–2000: Rune Svaninger
- 2000–2001: Reidar Rönnecke
- 2001–2004: Jan Peterson
- 2004–2013: Staffan Hörnberg
- 2013–2014: Ann Kabo
- 2014–2014: Michael Lisberg
- 2014–2018: Johan Harryson
- 2018–2019: Christer Carlsson
- 2019–2023: Peter Morfeldt
- 2023–present: Lars Jonsson

== In popular culture ==
The Swedish Netflix series Young Royals is inspired by the controversies surrounding Lundsbergs boarding school. The series takes place at a fictional version of the school called Hillerska.
