= Marcus Wallenberg (born 1956) =

Swedish banker and industrialist

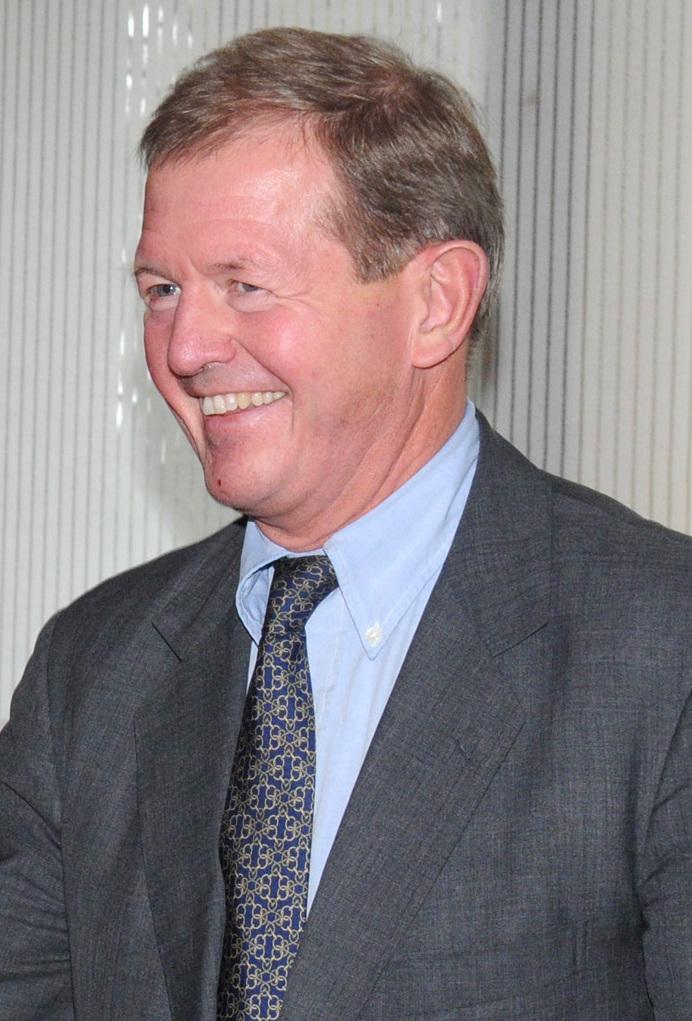
- Wallenberg in 2013
- Born: September 2, 1956 (age 70); Stockholm, Sweden
- Education: Georgetown University (BS)
- Spouse: Fanny Sachs
- Children: 4
- Parent(s): Marc Wallenberg; Olga Wehtje
- Relatives: Jacob Wallenberg (cousin); Peter Wallenberg Jr. (cousin)

Marcus "Husky" Wallenberg (born September 2, 1956) is a Swedish banker and industrialist. A leading member of the Wallenberg family, he is the chairman of Skandinaviska Enskilda Banken since 2005 and of Saab since 2006.

== Early life ==
Marcus Wallenberg was born on September 2, 1956, in Stockholm, Sweden. His father, Marc Wallenberg, was a banker. His mother is Olga Wehtje. He is a member of the prominent Wallenberg family.

Wallenberg holds a Bachelor of Science degree from the Edmund A. Walsh School of Foreign Service. He served as a lieutenant in the Royal Swedish Naval Academy in 1977.

== Career ==
Wallenberg began his career in the New York City office of Citibank in 1980–1982. He subsequently worked for Deutsche Bank, followed by S. G. Warburg & Co., Citicorp and the SEB Group.

Wallenberg served as the President and CEO of Investor from 1999 to 2005. He served as the Chairman of the International Chamber of Commerce from 2006 to 2008.

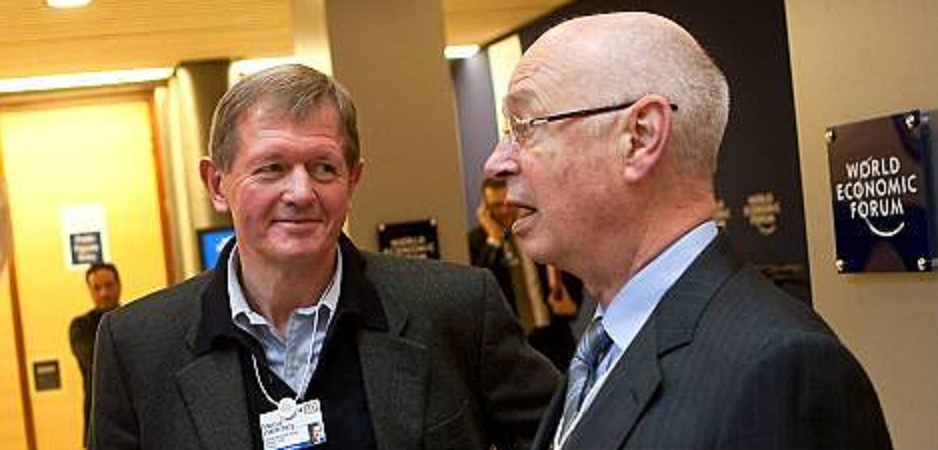
Marcus Wallenberg and Klaus Schwab at World Economic Forum

Wallenberg is the Vice Chairman of the Institute of International Finance. He serves on the board of directors of Skandinaviska Enskilda Banken, Electrolux, Ericsson, LKAB, AstraZeneca, Stora Enso, Saab, and Knut and Alice Wallenberg Foundation. He is a member of the Steering Committee of the Bilderberg Group.

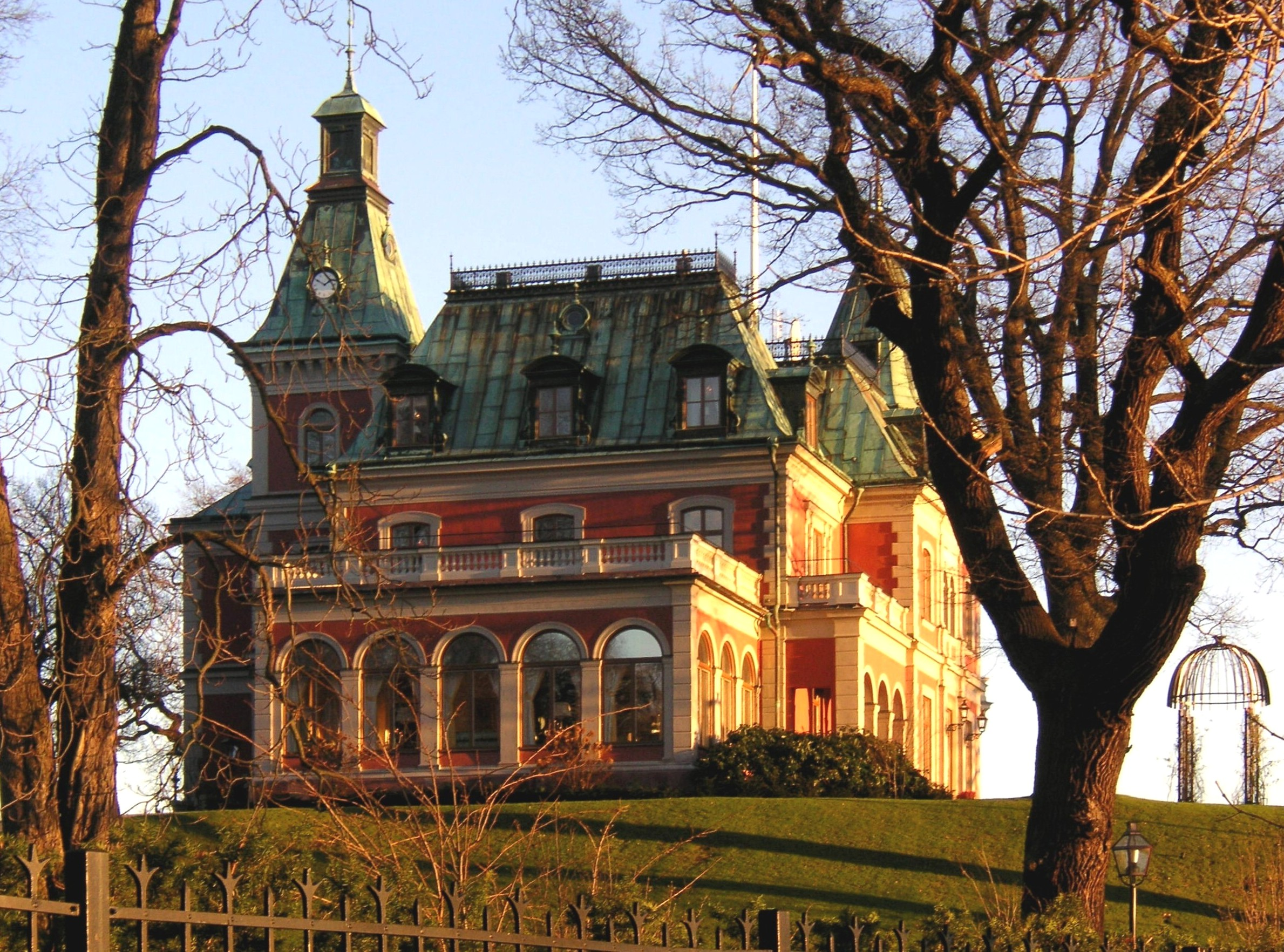
Täcka Udden.

He is also a former member of the board of directors of Temasek Holdings and currently on the Temasek International Panel.

== Personal life ==
Wallenberg has three children from his first marriage to Caroline Wallenberg (née Månsson). He is married to Fanny Sachs, an architect. They have one child together. They reside at Vidbynäs estate and on Djurgården.
