= Tage William-Olsson =

Swedish architect

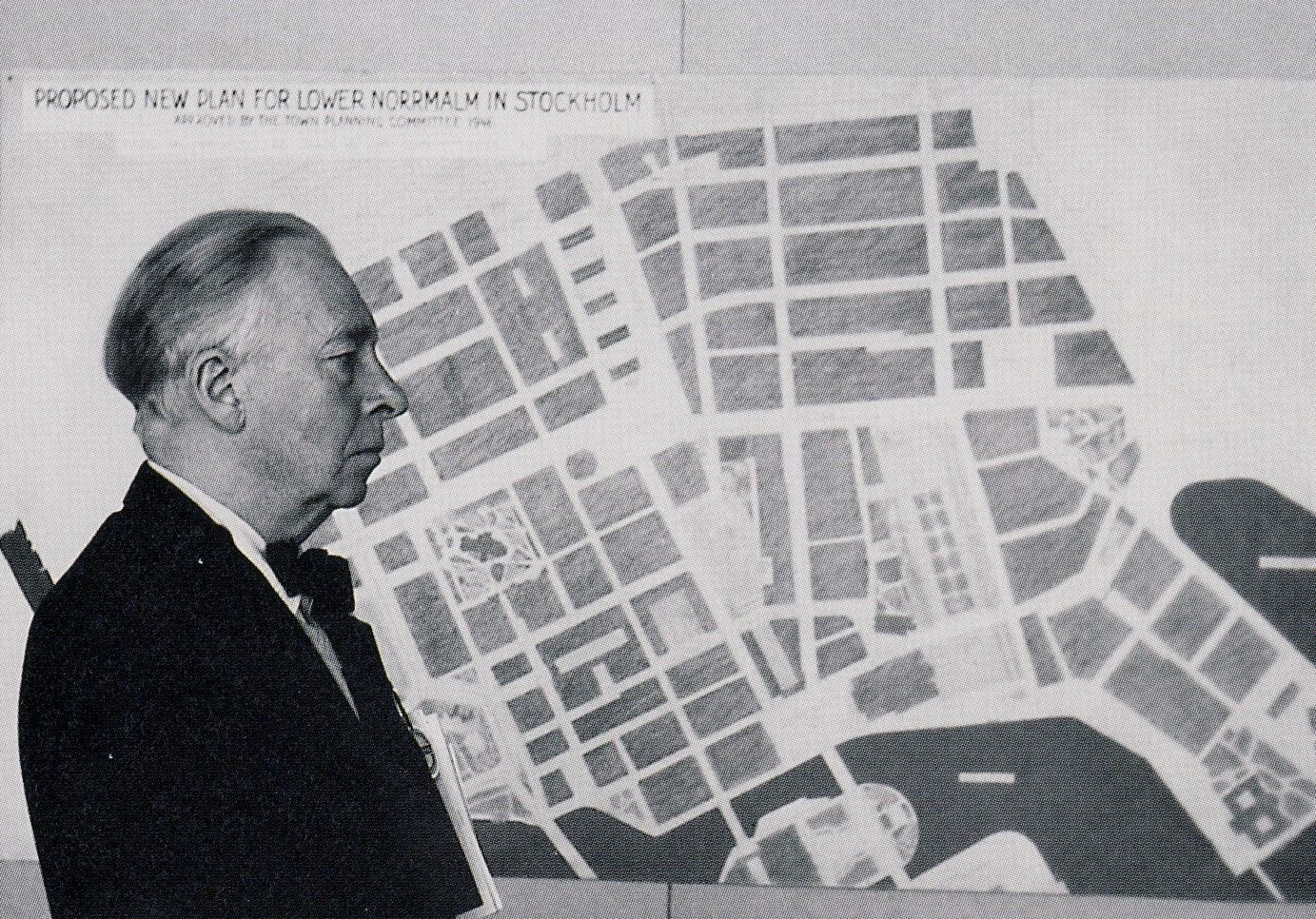
Tage William-Olsson in 1946.

Tage William-Olsson (8 June 1888 – 22 August 1960) was a Swedish architect and chief town planning architect of Gothenburg. He was one of the designers of the Slussen traffic-roundabout infrastructure-project built during 1935 in Stockholm.

== Biography ==
Carl Martin Tage William-Olsson was born in London, England. His parents were Swedish businessman William Olof Olsson (1862-1923) and his wife Maria Bergman (1862-1954). His brother William Frits William-Olsson (1902-1990) was a professor of Economic Geography at the Stockholm School of Economics. In 1896, the family moved to Stockholm where his father founded the Lundsbergs boarding school (Lundsbergs skola).

William-Olsson attended the University of Sheffield 1906–1907. He graduated in engineering at KTH Royal Institute of Technology (1908). He took a job as metallurgist at AB Gröndals Patents in Stockholm. In 1925 he started his own architectural firm which he had until 1930, when he became an employee of the city planning office in Stockholm. From 1935 to 1943, he had his own architectural firm in Stockholm. From 1943 to 1953, he was the city planning manager in Gothenburg.

In the 1930s, Lundborg proposed a design for the area of Slussenområdet in central Stockholm. The planning commission for the Slussen construction project included architects Tage William-Olsson and Holger Blom (1906- 1996), in collaboration city planning officials including engineer Gösta Lundborg (1883-1959).

== Other sources ==
- Eva Rudberg (2004) Tage William-Olsson : stridbar planerare och visionär arkitekt ( Stockholmia förlag) ISBN 9789170311383
