= Claes Dahlbäck =

Swedish businessman

Claes Åke Gustaf Dahlbäck (born 6 June 1947) is a Swedish businessman.

== Biography ==
He received an M.Sc. and a PhD in Economics from the Stockholm School of Economics.

In 1973, he joined Investor AB as an analyst in New York City. From 1978 to 1999, he served as its President and Chief Executive Officer. From April 1999 to April 2002, he served as its vice-chairman, from April 2002 to April 2005 as its chairman, and since April 2005 as senior advisor. Since November 2007, he has also served as senior advisor to the Foundation Asset Management AB.

He serves as chairman of the board of Stora Enso and chairman of the advisory committee of the following EQT AB subsidiaries: EQT III, IV and V, EQT Greater China II, EQT Expansion Capital II and the EQT Opportunity Fund. Previously, he served on the boards of directors of the ABB Group, Allmänna Svenska Elektriska Aktiebolaget, Electrolux, Ericsson, OMX, Goldman Sachs Saab Scania, Skandinaviska Enskilda Banken, SKF, Findus, V&S Group and Gambro.

He is a member of the Royal Swedish Academy of Engineering Sciences and the Royal Swedish Society of Naval Sciences. He serves on the board of directors of the Stockholm School of Economics and as chair of the Stockholm School of Economics Foundation. In 2003 he participated in the annual conference of the Bilderberg Group. He is a Commander of the Order of the White Rose of Finland and a recipient of the Swedish Kings Medal of the Twelfth Night with the Seraphim Ribbon. In 2003, he served as president of the International Wine and Spirit Competition.
