= Peter Wallenberg Jr. =

Swedish businessman (born 1959)

Peter Wallenberg Jr
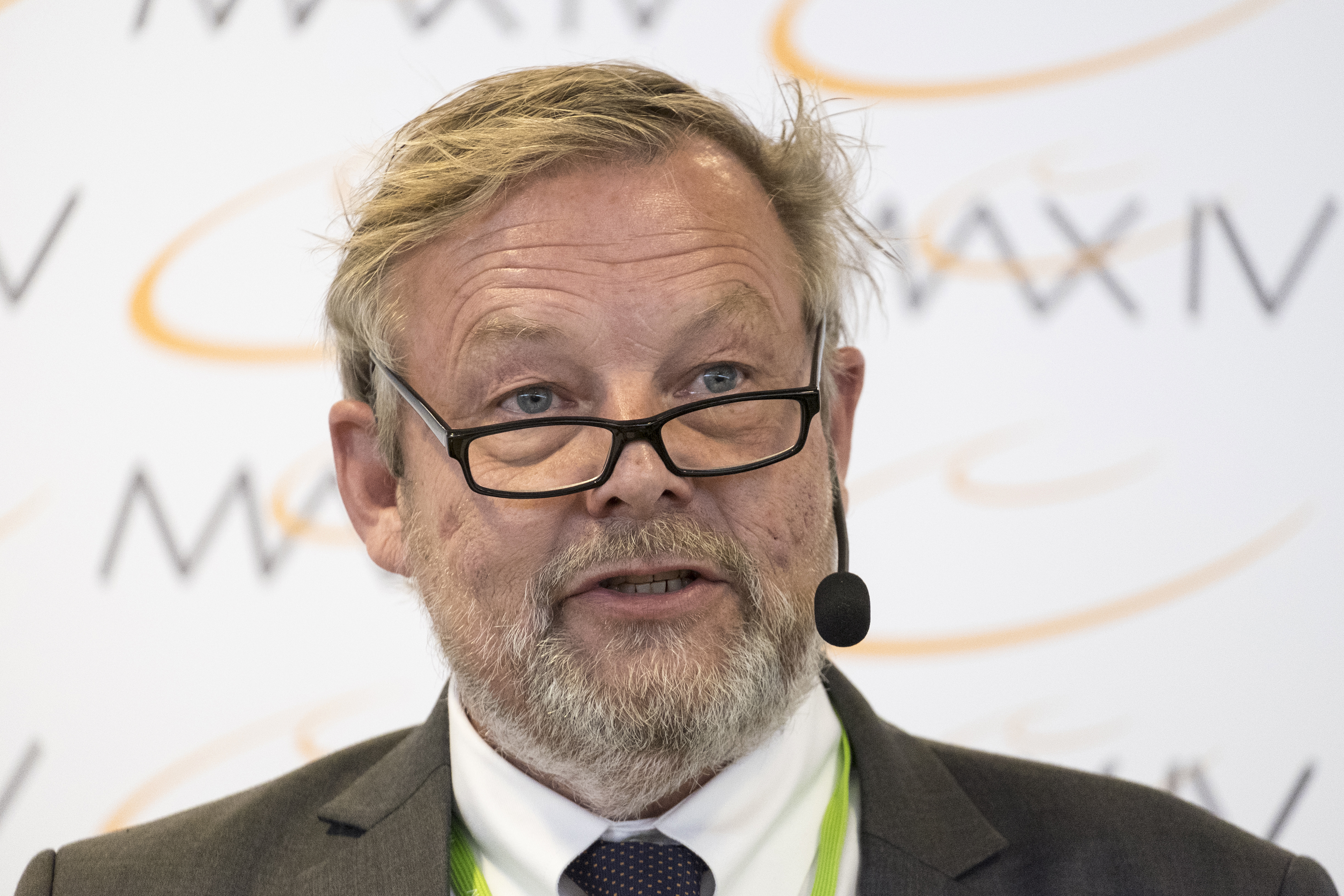
- Peter Wallenberg Jr in June 2016.
- Born: 8 May 1959 (age 66); Nyköping, Sweden
- Other names: "Poker"
- Occupation: Businessman
- Parent(s): Peter Wallenberg Sr. Suzanne Fleming
- Relatives: Jacob Wallenberg (brother); Marc Wallenberg (uncle); Marcus Wallenberg Jr. (grandfather); Marcus Wallenberg Sr. (great-grandfather)

Peter “Poker” Åke Wallenberg (born 8 May 1959) is a Swedish businessman, chair of eight of the sixteen public and private foundations formed by the Wallenberg family or established in memory of family members. The foundations, which are known collectively as the Wallenberg Foundations, annually award funding of approximately SEK 2.2 billion, largely for research and education at Swedish universities.

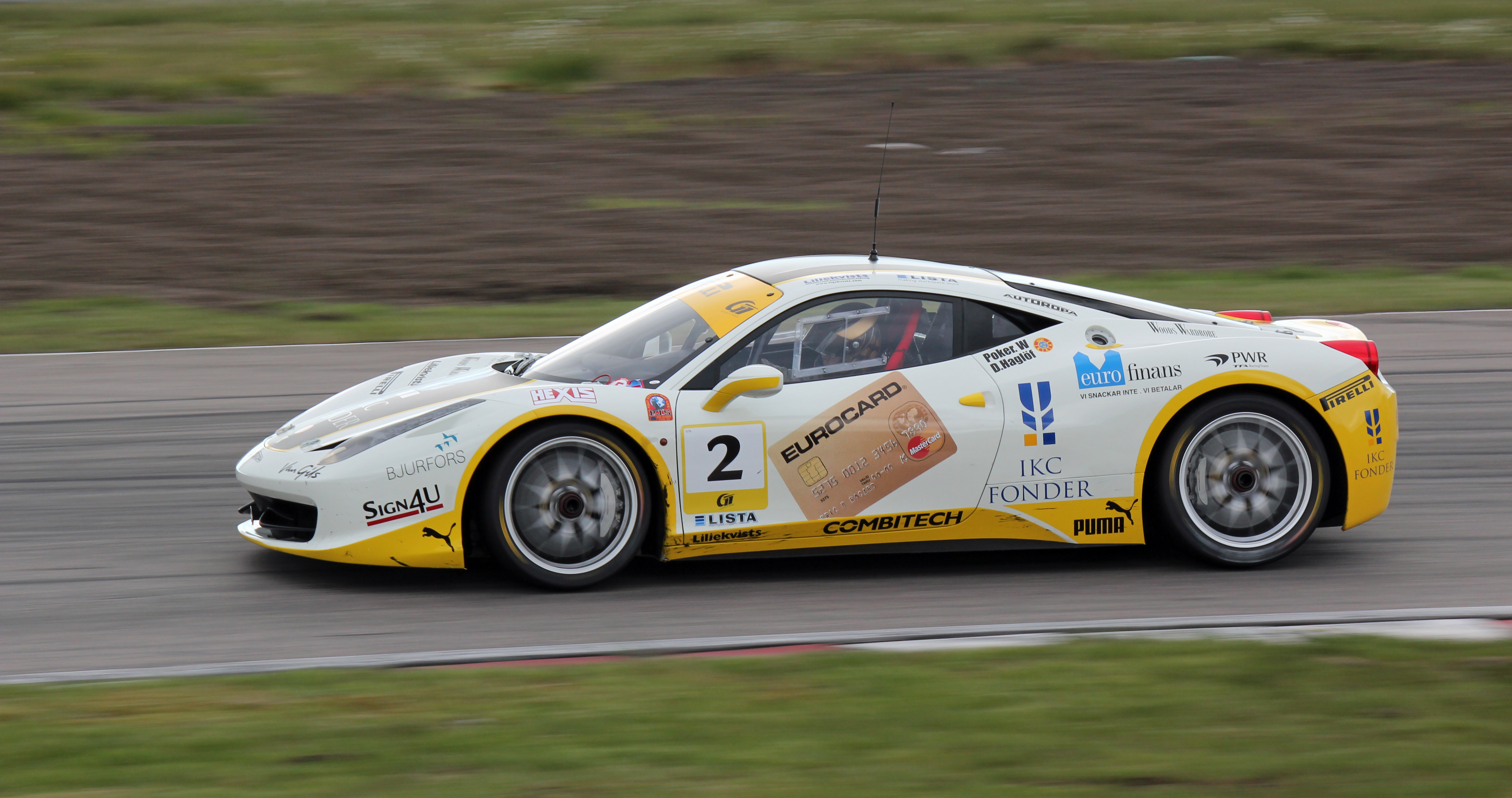
Peter Wallenberg Jr. race driving in 2012

Peter Wallenberg is Chair of Knut and Alice Wallenberg Foundation, Marianne and Marcus Wallenberg Foundation, Berit Wallenberg Foundation, Dr. Tech. Marcus Wallenberg Foundation for Education in International Industrial Entrepreneurship, Marcus Wallenberg Foundation for International Scientific Collaboration, Peter Wallenberg Foundation, The Foundation for Economic History Research within Banking and Enterprise, and Wallenberg Foundations AB.

In addition, he is engaged in various sectors, including the engineering industry, private equity and the hotel industry, as a director of Atlas Copco, Scania and EQT, and as chairman of the Board of Grand Hôtel Stockholm. Before being appointed chairman, he was president and CEO of Grand Hôtel during the years 1994–2006.

He is Chairman of KAK, the Royal Automobile Club, and a racing driver. In 2012 he founded PWR Racing jointly with the racing driver Daniel Haglöf.

In 2017 he founded Poker Racing for Charity, whose mission is to support and raise the profile of charitable organizations and the work they do.

== Honorary Awards ==
- Elected member of the Royal Swedish Academy of Engineering Sciences (IVA), Department of Education and Research (2015)
- Elected member of the Academy of Gastronomy (2016)
- Honorary Doctor, Linköping University (2019)
- Honorary Member, Royal Swedish Academy of Engineering Sciences (IVA) (2019)

== Education ==
Peter Wallenberg has a BSBA in Hotel Administration from the University of Denver, U.S.A., and an International Baccalaureate from the American School in Leysin, Switzerland.

== Family ==
Peter Wallenberg Jr is nicknamed “Poker”, and is the youngest son of Peter Wallenberg (1926–2015) and Suzanne Fleming, née Grevillius. He is the brother of Jacob Wallenberg and Andrea Gandet.
