= Jacob Wallenberg =

Swedish banker and industrialist (born 1956)

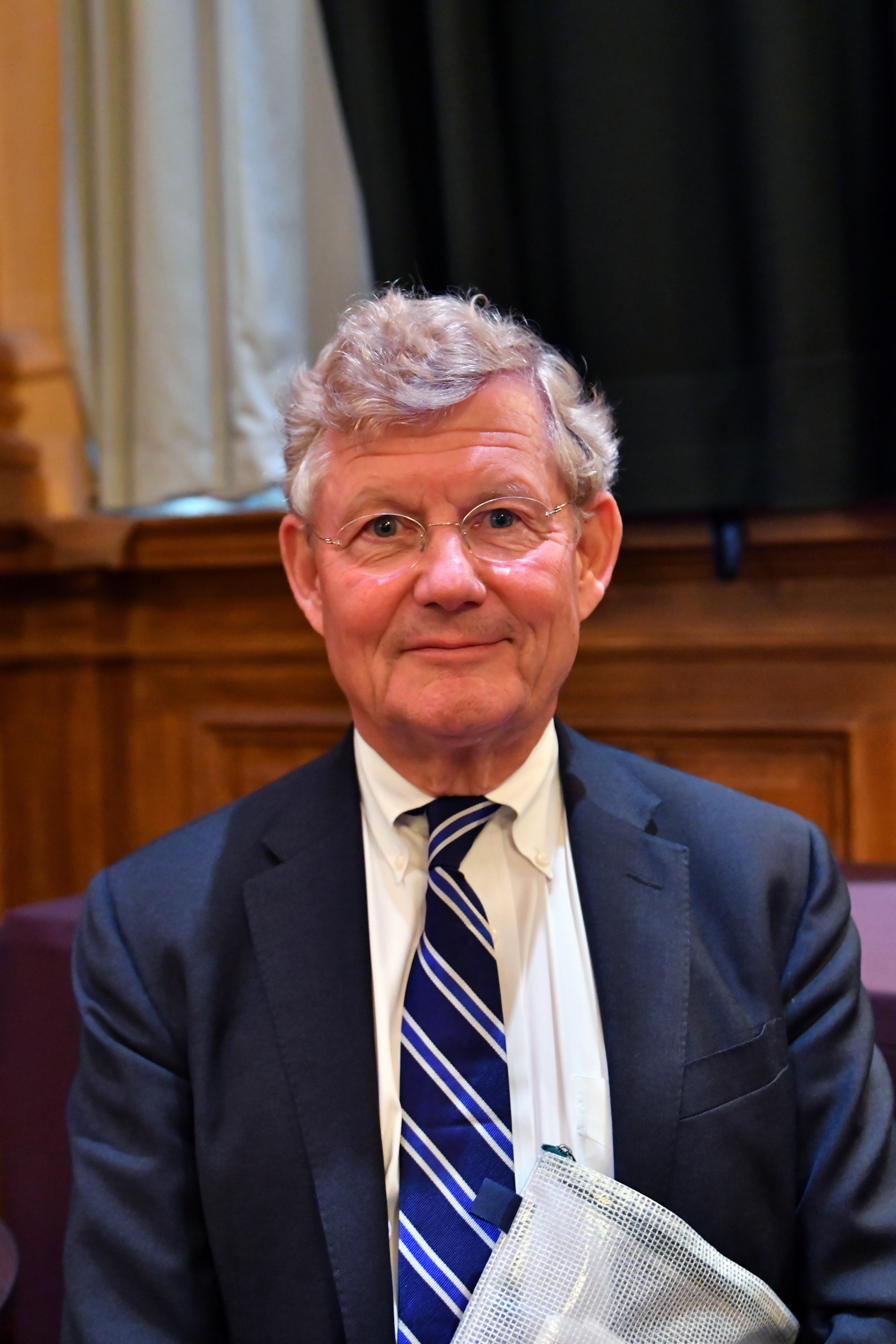
- Wallenberg in 2018
- Born: 13 January 1956 (age 70); Stockholm, Sweden
- Education: Wharton School
- Occupations: Chairman of Investor AB; Vice chairman of ABB, Ericsson, FAM, Patricia Industries
- Spouse(s): Marie Wehtje (m. 1986; div. 2008) Annika Levin (m. 2015)
- Children: 3
- Parent(s): Peter Wallenberg and Suzanne Fleming née Grevillius
- Website: Investor Ab; Wallenberg.com

Jacob Wallenberg (born 13 January 1956) is a Swedish banker and industrialist from the Wallenberg family who serves as chairman of Investor AB since 2005, and as a board member for multiple other companies. Since 2022, he is also chairman of the Confederation of Swedish Enterprise. He was described by The Guardian as a “prince in Sweden's royal family of finance”.

== Biography ==
=== Early life and education ===
Wallenberg was born in Stockholm in 1956 into the Wallenberg family, the son of banker Peter Wallenberg Sr. and Suzanne Fleming Grevillius. He was educated at the Wharton School of the University of Pennsylvania, receiving a BS in economics in 1980 and an MBA in 1981. He also studied at the Royal Swedish Naval Academy and is a reserve officer in the Swedish Navy.

=== Career ===
Jacob Wallenberg was Chairman of Skandinaviska Enskilda Banken (SEB) from 1998 to 2005 and Vice Chairman from 2005 to 2014. He was CEO of the bank in 1997, and, between 1995 and 1996, served as EVP and head of corporate and investment banking. Wallenberg has also served as Vice Chairman of Atlas Copco, SAS Group, and Stora Enso, and has served on the boards of The Coca-Cola Company, Electrolux, WM-data, and the Stockholm Chamber of Commerce.

Jacob Wallenberg is Chairman of the Board of Investor AB, a lead shareholder of Nordic-based global companies. He is Vice Chairman of ABB, Ericsson AB, FAM AB, and Patricia Industries. Wallenberg also serves on the boards of Nasdaq Inc, the Knut and Alice Wallenberg Foundation, various other Wallenberg family foundations, and the Stockholm School of Economics. He is a member of the steering committee of the Bilderberg Group, the European Round Table of Industrialists, and the advisory board of the Tsinghua University School of Economics and Management. He is also member of the Trilateral Commission. Wallenberg is Honorary Chairman of the Mayor of Shanghai’s International Business Leaders Advisory Council (IBLAC).

He was elected chairman of the Confederation of Swedish Enterprise in May 2022.

== Family ==
He is the son of Peter Wallenberg Sr. and Suzanne Fleming (née Grevillius). In 1986 Wallenberg married Marie Wehtje, a daughter of civil engineer Urban Wehtje of the Wehtje family, and Merete Wehtje (née Bylandt-Grøn, in Denmark). Their marriage produced three children, born in 1988, 1989 and 1990. They divorced in 2008. Since 2014, he has been married to Annika Levin.

Marcus Wallenberg d.ä., banker and industrialist
Marcus Wallenberg d.y., banker & industrialist
Amalia Hagdahl
Peter Wallenberg, industrialist
Alexander Mackay, businessman
Dorothy Mackay
Edith Burns
Jacob Wallenberg
Karl Grevillius, chief accountant
Åke Grevillius, chief physician
Emilia Lindquist
Suzanne Grevillius Fleming
Waldemar Stenhammar, lieutenant-colonel
Vian Stenhammar
Olga Löfwall

== Honours ==
- Commander of the Order of the Lion of Finland
- Commander of the Order of May, Argentina
- Member of The Royal Swedish Academy of Engineering Sciences (2000)
- Honorary Doctor of Economics, Stockholm School of Economics (2005)
- Member of The Royal Swedish Society of Naval Sciences (2006)
- H. M. The King's Medal, 12th size gold medal on Seraphim Order ribbon (2007)
- Honorary Doctor of Economics, Hanken School of Economics, Helsinki, (2009)
- SSE Research Award, Stockholm School of Economics Institute for Research (2010)
- Order of the Rising Sun, 2nd Class, Gold and Silver Star (2018)
- Legion of Honour, France (2019)

== See also ==
- Wallenberg family
