= Peter Wallenberg Sr. =

Swedish businessman (1926–2015)

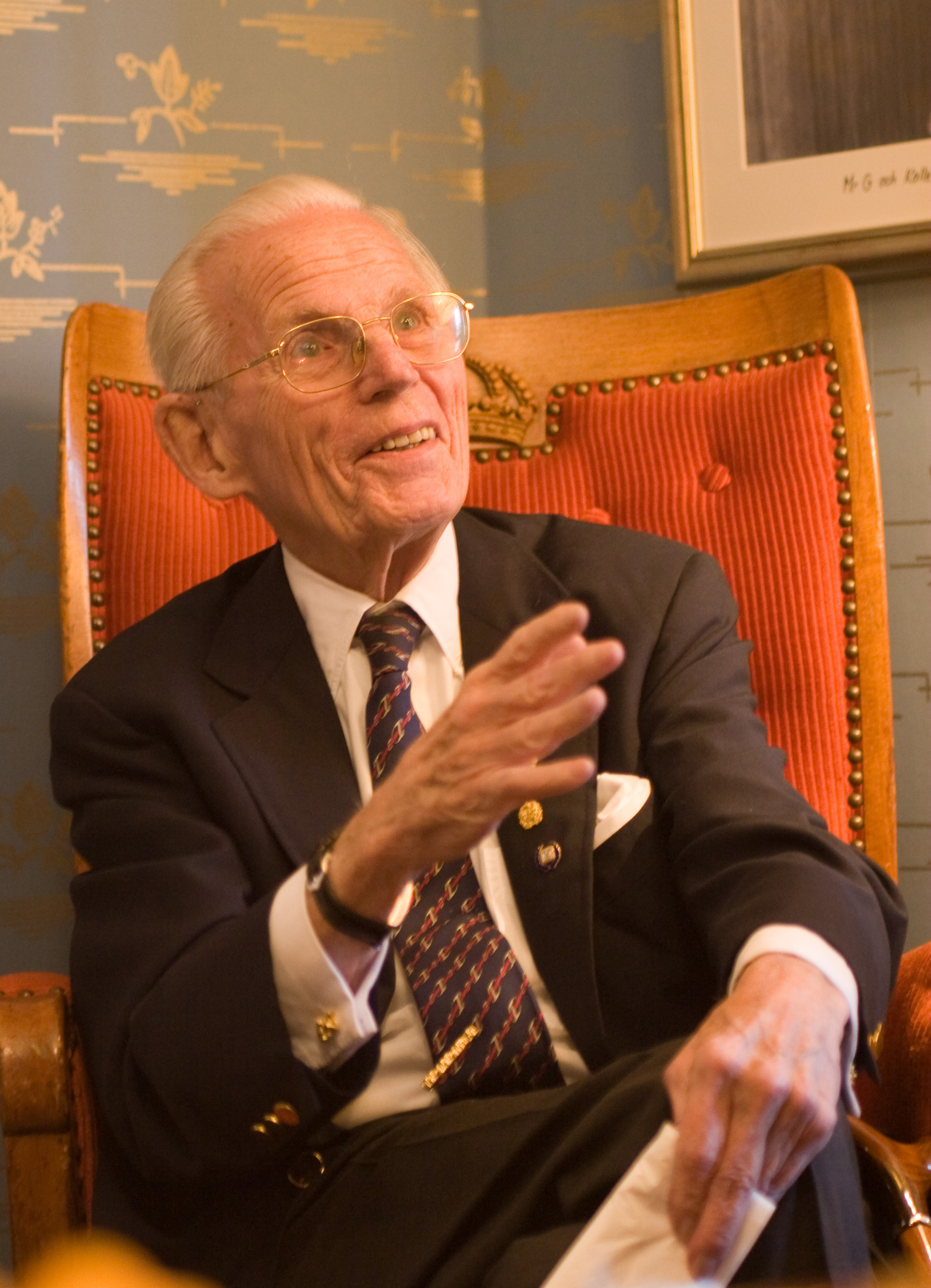
- Wallenberg in 2007
- Born: 29 May 1926; Stockholm, Sweden
- Died: 19 January 2015 (aged 88); Värmdö, Sweden
- Occupation: Businessman
- Spouses: Suzanne Grevillius (m. 1954–1962) Alice Rosier Pearce (m. 1966–1969) Anna-Maria Eek (m. 1971–1980)
- Children: 3, including Jacob Wallenberg and Peter Wallenberg
- Parent: Marcus Wallenberg
- Relatives: Marc Wallenberg (brother); Jacob Wallenberg (uncle); Marcus Wallenberg (grandfather)

Peter "Pirre" Wallenberg Sr. (29 May 1926 – 19 January 2015) was a Swedish business leader who was chairman of Investor AB for ten years.

== Early life and education ==
Wallenberg was born in Skeppsholm Parish, Stockholm, Sweden, into the Wallenberg finance family. He was the son of banker Marcus Wallenberg Jr. and his Scottish wife Dorothy (née Mackay), the younger brother of Marc Wallenberg and the nephew of Jacob Wallenberg. He earned a Candidate of Law degree in 1949 from Stockholm College, now Stockholm University. (Note: Other sources says 1953.)

== Career ==
He began his career in 1953 at Atlas Copco. Wallenberg worked at its subsidiary in the United States from 1956 to 1959 and was CEO of its subsidiary in Rhodesia from 1959 to 1962 and in Congo from 1960 to 1962 and in England from 1962 to 1967. He was CEO of Atlas Copco MCT AB (Mining and Construction Technique) in Stockholm from 1968 to 1970 and Vice CEO of Atlas Copco AB from 1970 to 1974. Wallenberg was industrial advisor to the Skandinaviska Enskilda Banken (SEB) from 1974. For a long time he stood in the shadow of his father, who made his oldest son Marc his apprentice and doubted his youngest son Peter's abilities. Only in 1982, after his father's death, did he become a prominent member of the Wallenberg clan. After his father's death, Peter Wallenberg bought out Volvo's shares in two family businesses and merged the three family investment firms, Investor AB, Providentia and Export Invest. He served as chairman of Investor AB for ten years, during which time he internationalised the firm and set in motion international mergers that created companies such as ABB, AstraZeneca and Stora Enso.

Wallenberg was in the mid-1980s a board member of Atlas Copco AB, AB SKF, Investor AB, Förvaltnings AB Providentia, Knut and Alice Wallenberg Foundation, AB Papyrus, Nymölla AB, Fastighets AB Stockholm-Saltsjön, Enskilda Securities in England and the International Chamber of Commerce – Budget Commission and Finance Committee. He was first vice chairman of Skandinaviska Enskilda Banken, vice chairman of ASEA, Broströms Rederi AB, AB Electrolux, Telefon AB LM Ericsson and Stora Kopparbers Bergslags AB. Wallenberg was also a board member of the Federation of Swedish Industries (Sveriges Industriförbund), the Swedish National Committee of the International Chamber of Commerce, the Stockholm School of Economics Association (from 1988 to 2001), Dillon, Read & Co. in the United States, Per Jacobsson Foundation in the United States and the Swiss Bank Corporation Advisory Board in Switzerland. He was also chairman of the International Council of Swedish Industry (NIR), Swedish-French Research Association (Svensk-franska forskningsföreningen) and the Swedish-British Society as well as the Royal Lawn Tennis Club (Kungliga Lawn Tennis Klubben). Wallenberg was also honorary chairman of the Swedish Tennis Association (Svenska Tennisförbundet) and a member of the Royal Swedish Academy of Engineering Sciences.

Wallenberg was in the early 1990s the chairman of the board of ASEA AB, Atlas Copco AB, Investor AB, STORA, Knut and Alice Wallenberg Foundation and co-chairman of ABB Asea Brown Boveri. He was first vice chairman of SEB, vice chairman of AB Electrolux, Incentive AB, AB SKF and Telefon AB LM Ericsson. Wallenberg was also board member of the Federation of Swedish Industries, Nobel Foundation, Scandinavian Airlines, Swedish Intercontinental Airlines, AB Aerotransport, the Swedish National Committee of the International Chamber of Commerce (ICC) and Immediate Past President of the ICC in Paris. He was also board member of the Stockholm School of Economics Association, Dillon, Read & Co. in the United States, Per Jacobsson Foundation in the United States, Lauder Institute and the Swiss Bank Corporation Advisory Board in Switzerland. Until his death he also directed several of the Wallenberg family foundations, in particular the Knut and Alice Wallenberg Foundation and the Marianne and Marcus Wallenberg Foundation. The Peter Wallenberg, D.Econ, Foundation for Economics and Technology (Ekon.dr Peter Wallenbergs Stiftelse för Ekonomi och Teknik) was founded in 1996 to honour him on his 70th birthday.

== Personal life and death ==
Wallenberg was in his first marriage married 1954–1962 to Suzanne Grevillius (born 1933), the daughter of chief physician Åke Grevillius and Sylvia (née Stenhammar). Together they had three children: Jacob Wallenberg (born 1956), Andrea Gandet (born 1957) and Peter Wallenberg, Jr. (born 1959). In his second marriage he was married 1966–1969 to Alice Pearce Rosier (1944–1970) and the third marriage 1971–1980 to the judge Anna-Maria Eek (born 1927).

Wallenberg died in his residence in Värmdö on 19 January 2015 at the age of 88. The funeral was held in Katarina Church in Stockholm on 4 February 2015. It was attended by the king Carl XVI Gustaf, Queen Silvia, Crown Princess Victoria, Prince Daniel, Prince Carl Philip, Stefan Löfven, Leif Johansson, Cristina Stenbeck, Pehr G. Gyllenhammar, Maud Olofsson, Karl-Petter Thorwaldsson, Annie Lööf, Hans Dalborg, Claes Dahlbäck, Helene Hellmark Knutsson, Magdalena Andersson, Mikael Damberg, Börje Ekholm, Anders Borg, Jan Carlzon, Fredrik Lundberg, Mona Sahlin, Carl-Henric Svanberg, Annika Falkengren, Leif Pagrotsky, Michael Treschow, Jan Björklund, Ulf Adelsohn, Lena Adelsohn Liljeroth, Pär Nuder, Hans Vestberg, Göran Hägglund, Fredrik Reinfeldt, Anna Kinberg Batra, Anders Wall, Carl Bennet, Hans Stråberg and others. During the afternoon there was a special reception at the Grand Hôtel. Wallenberg was taken to his final resting place in the world's only Saab hearse, manufactured by the company that his father once was one of the founders of.

== Awards and decorations ==
=== Swedish ===
- Seraphim Medal, Sweden (2000)
- H. M. The King's Medal, 12th size gold medal worn on the Royal Order of the Seraphim ribbon, Sweden (1983)
- Order of Vasa, Sweden (1974)

=== Foreign ===
- Royal Norwegian Order of Merit, Norway (1992)
- Order of the Lion of Finland, Finland (1995)
- (Portugal) Grand Cross of the Order of Entrepreneurial Merit, Category of Industrial Merit (11 December 1990)
- Order of St. Gregory the Great, Holy See (1991)
- Order of Merit of the Federal Republic of Germany, Germany (1992)
- Order of the Southern Cross, Brazil (1989)
- Order of Isabella the Catholic, Spain (1979)
- Order of the British Empire, United Kingdom (1989)
- (Italy) 2nd Class / Grand Officer of the Order of Merit of the Italian Republic (2 June 1995)
- Order of Leopold, Belgium (1989)
- Legion of Honour, France (1987)
- Order of the Three Stars, Latvia (2001)

== Honours ==
Wallenberg's honours:

- 1984 – Honorary Doctor of Economics, Stockholm School of Economics
- 1997 – Technology Honorary Doctorate, Royal Institute of Technology
- 2001 – Honorary Doctor of Philosophy, Uppsala University
- 2008 – Honorary Doctor of Laws, Stockholm University
- 2010 – Honorary doctor of Medicine, Karolinska Institute
- 1985 – Doctor of Humane Letters h.c., Augustana College, US
- 1989 – Doctor of Laws h.c., Upsala College, US
- 1990 – Doctor of Humane Letters h.c., Georgetown University, US
- 1996 – Doctor Honoris Causa, National Polytechnic Institute of Lorraine, France
- 1998 – Honorary Doctor of Laws, Gustavus Adolphus College, US
- 2009 – Doctor of Commerce h.c., Stellenbosch University, South Africa
- 2010 – Doctor of Humanities (D.H.) h.c., Villanova University, US
