= Marcus Wallenberg Jr. =

Swedish sportsman and businessman

Marcus Wallenberg Jr. RoKKMO
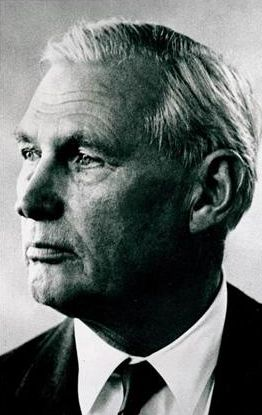
- Marcus Wallenberg during the 1960s
- Born: 5 October 1899; Stockholm, Sweden
- Died: 13 September 1982 (aged 82); Stockholm, Sweden
- Education: Stockholm School of Economics
- Occupations: Banker; Industrialist; Tennis player
- Spouses: Dorothy Mackay (m. 1923–1935) Marianne De Geer af Leufsta (m. 1937–1978)
- Children: Peter Wallenberg Sr. Marc Wallenberg; Ann-Mari Wallenberg
- Parent(s): Marcus Wallenberg; Amalia Wallenberg
- Relatives: Jacob Wallenberg (brother)
- Awards: Royal Order of the Seraphim and more
- Tennis career
- Plays: Right–handed

Grand Slam singles results
- Wimbledon: 2R (1922)

Grand Slam doubles results
- Wimbledon: 2R (1922, 1925)

Grand Slam mixed doubles results
- Wimbledon: 1R (1922)

Team competitions
- Davis Cup: SF (Europe) (1926)

Marcus "Dodde" Wallenberg Jr. RoKKMO (5 October 1899 – 13 September 1982), was a Swedish banker, business manager and member of the Swedish Wallenberg family. He was the most influential representative for the Swedish industrial tradition and Swedish business’ during the 20th century. He was the CEO of Stockholms Enskilda Bank 1946–1958 and during half a century – from the early 1930s until his death in 1982 – he led and reconstructed many of Sweden's largest companies. During World War II, Marcus, together with Erik Boheman, were appointed to conduct the Swedish trade negotiations.

Marcus Wallenberg had a big interest in sailing and tennis. He participated in the 1936 Olympic sailing competitions and was a Swedish elite tennis player. He received a technological honorary degree from Royal Institute of Technology.

The historian of business and author Ronald Fagerfjäll describes him as Europe's most powerful banker of the 20th century.

== Early life ==
Wallenberg was born on 5 October 1899, in Stockholm, Sweden, the son of Marcus Wallenberg and his wife Amalia (née Hagdahl) and brother of Jacob Wallenberg. He passed studentexamen in 1917, became a reserve officer in 1919, and graduated from the Stockholm School of Economics in 1920. Wallenberg pursued banking studies and had various jobs in Geneva, London, New York City, Paris, and Berlin from 1920 to 1925. Wallenberg was an avid tennis player and became Swedish indoor champion in singles game for gentlemen in tennis in 1920 and 1926.

== Career ==
Wallenberg became assistant director of Stockholms Enskilda Bank in 1925 and was Vice CEO and member of the board there from 1927. Wallenberg was during the early 1930s board member of Järnvägs AB Stockholm–Saltsjön, AB Atlas Diesel, Investor AB, AB Diligentia, Rederi AB Tanker, ASEA, AB Elektro-Invest and Trafik AB Stockholm-Björknäs. He was also a member of the council of the Stockholm Chamber of Commerce. He was in the late 1930s, chairman of the board of AB Atlas-Diesel, AB Lauxein-Casco, Hults Bruks AB, Industri AB Furuplywood and Trafik AB Stockholm-Björknäs. Wallenberg was also vice chairman of Telefon AB L.M. Ericsson and board member of AB Diligentia, Electro-Invest, AB Förenade Flygverkstäderna, AB Nordströms Linbanor, AB Scania-Vabis, AB Svenska Järnvägsverkstäderna, ASEA, Ericsson Telephones Limited, Järnvägs AB Stockholm–Saltsjön, Mexican Telephone and Telegraph Co., Plantagengesellschaft Clementina, Società Elettro-Telefónica Meridionale, Società Esercizi Telefonici and the Federation of Swedish Industries (Sveriges Industriförbund). He was also chairman of the Swedish Lawn Tennis Association (Svenska Lawntennisförbundet) and the Sailing Association Havsörnarna.

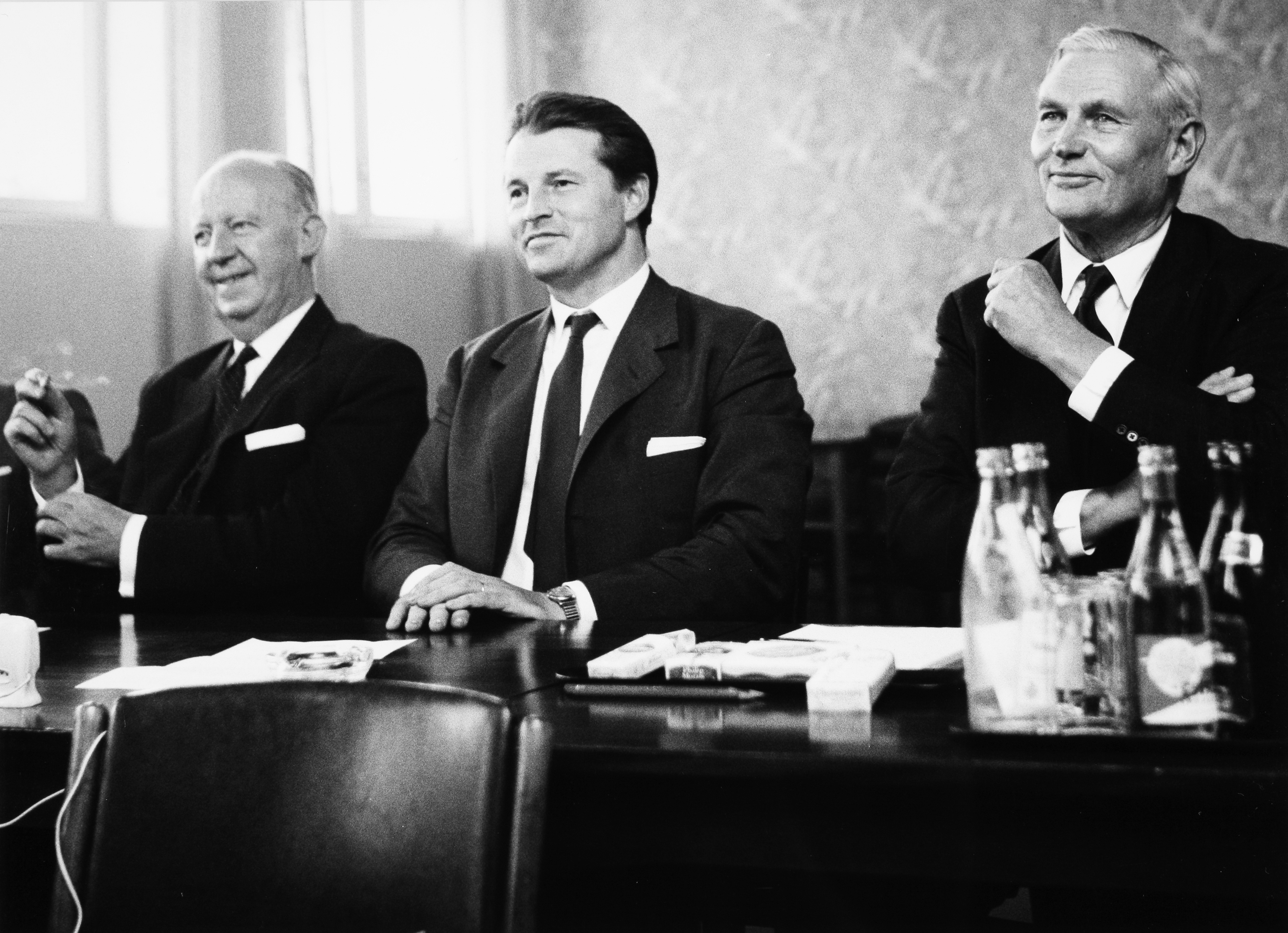
Wallenberg (right) together with SAS' board of directors, 1960s.

Wallenberg was in the mid-1940s the chairman of AB Atlas Diesel, Hults Bruks AB, Igelsta Trävaru AB, Järnvägs AB Stockholm–Saltsjön, Mexikandra Telefon AB and Max Sieverts Fabriks AB. He was vice chairman of Halmstad-Nässjö Järnvägs AB, Goodyear Gummi Fabrik AB, AB Papyrus, Svensk Interkontinental Lufttrafik AB, Telefon AB L.M. Ericsson and Yngeredsfors Kraft AB. Wallenberg was also board member of ASEA, Björneborgs Jernverks AB, AB Aerotransport, AB Diligentia, AB Elektro-Invest, AB Nordströms Linbanor, AB Scania-Vabis, AB Svenska Amerika Linien, AB Svenska Järnvägsverkstäderna, AB Svenska Maskinverken, AB Svenska Ostasiatiska Kompaniet, Stora Kopparbergs Bergslags AB, SAAB, Wifstavarfs AB, Banque d'État du Maro, Mexican Telephone & Telegraph Co., Federation of Swedish Industries, Swedish Bankers' Association (Svenska Bankföreningen), Swedish National Commission for International Business (Svenska nationalkommissionen för internationella näringsfrågor) and the Swedish National Museum of Science and Technology.

From 1933 onward, he was also a member of the Arbitration Committee of the Bank for International Settlements (BIS). During and prior to the Second World War, he was involved in negotiations regarding Swedish foreign trade with Nazi Germany. The Wallenberg empire’s close economic collaboration with the Nazis (e.g., between Stockholm’s Enskilda Bank and the Bosch Group) sparked controversy.

He was chairman of the Swedish representatives on the permanent Swedish-British Intergovernmental Commission from 1939 to 1943 and member of the permanent Swedish-British-American Intergovernmental Commission from 1943 and the Swedish Commission for the Swedish-Finnish trade negotiations from 1940 to 1944. He was also board member of the Swedish-English Association (Svensk-Engelska Föreningen) and chairman of the Swedish Tennis Association (Svenska Tennisförbundet) from 1934 to 1953. In 1946, Wallenberg became CEO of Stockholms Enskilda Bank. He held the post until 1958 when he became vice chairman of the board. During the 1950s, he was chairman of the board of AB Atlas Diesel, LM Ericsson, Scandinavian Airlines and the Swedish Bankers' Association. Wallenberg was a board member of ASEA (chairman from 1956), Stora Kopparbergs Bergslags AB, Federation of Swedish Industries (vice chairman from 1959, chairman 1962-1964) and the International Chamber of Commerce as well as chairman of its Swedish National Committee from 1951 to 1964 (honorary chairman from 1964) and was CEO of the English-Swedish Chamber of Commerce from the 1954. Wallenberg was also chairman of the Royal Lawn Tennis Club (Kungliga Lawn Tennis Klubben) and he became honorary chairman of the Swedish Tennis Association in 1953.

Wallenberg was chairman of the Swedish Bankers' Association twice, 1949-1951 and 1955-1957 and chairman of the Research Institute of Industrial Economics from 1950 to 1975 (honorary chairman from 1975). He was chairman of the Council of European Industrial Federations (CEIF) from 1960 to 1963 and in the Business and Industry Advisory Committee to the OECD (BIAC) from 1962 to 1964. Wallenberg was a member of the Economic Planning Council (Ekonomiska planeringsrådet) from 1962 to 1964 and chairman of the International Chamber of Commerce from 1965 to 1967. He was a member of the Steering Committee of the Bilderberg Group from 1954 to his death in 1982. He was also a board member of Knut and Alice Wallenberg Foundation and the Nobel Foundation. Wallenberg co-chaired the ICC-UN/GATT Economic Consultative Committee from 1969 to 1971. In 1969, he left the post of vice chairman of Stockholms Enskilda Bank and became chairman for two years until 1971 when the bank merged with Skandinaviska Banken and formed Skandinaviska Enskilda Banken. Wallenberg was chairman there from 1972 to 1976.

== Personal life and death ==
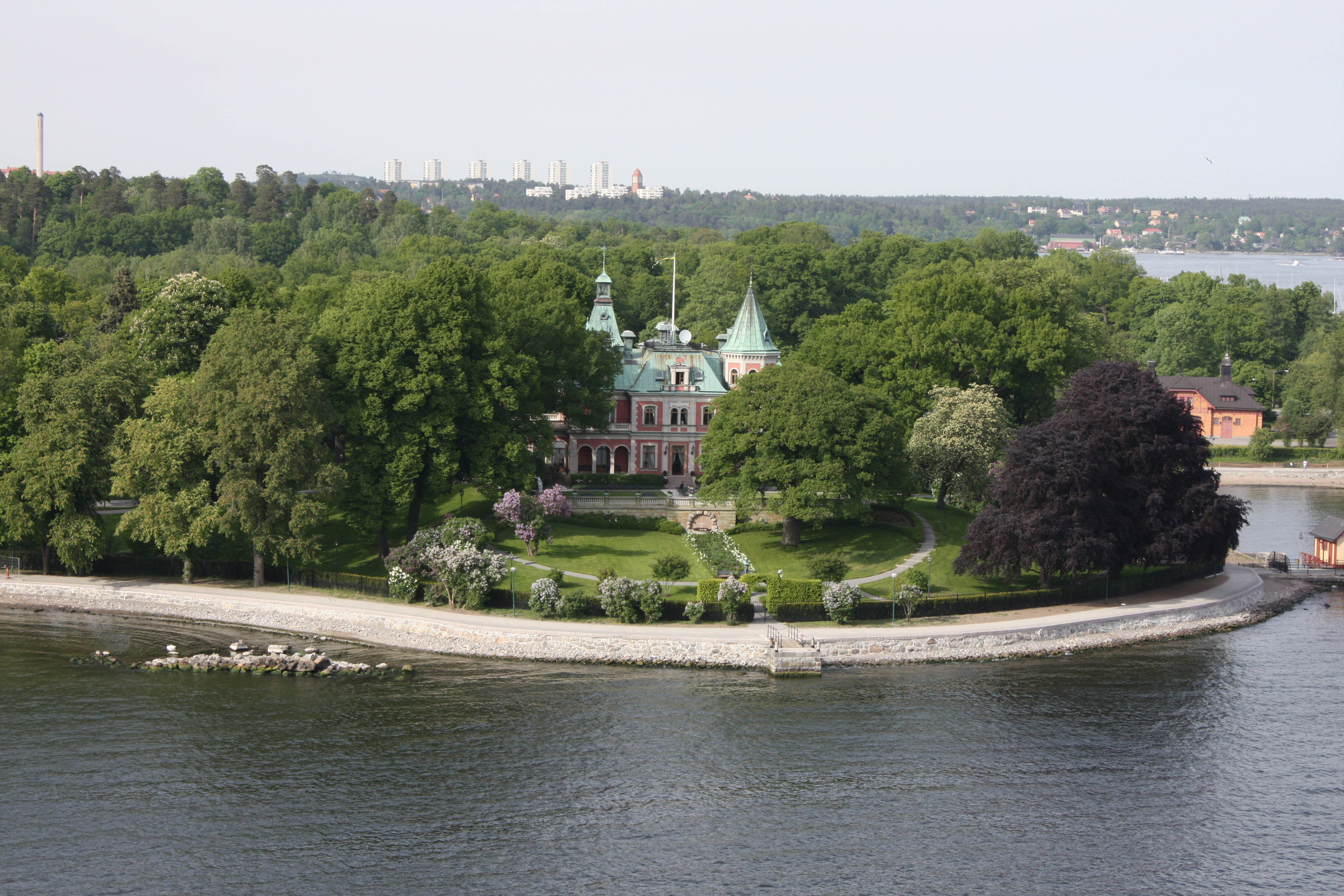
Villa Täcka Udden, residence of Wallenberg from 1978 until his death in 1982.

He was the father of Marc Wallenberg (1924–1971; who in turn was the father of Marcus Wallenberg), Peter Wallenberg Sr. (1926–2015) and Ann-Mari Wallenberg (1929–2019) in his first marriage (1923–1935) with Dorothy Mackay (1900–1984) from Scotland, the daughter of Alexander C.A. Mackay and Edith Bums. In 1936 he married Baroness Marianne De Geer af Leufsta (born 1893), the daughter of chamberlain Baron Louis de Geer af Leufsta and Baroness Märtha Cederström. Marianne had previously been married to Carl Bernadotte af Wisborg.

== Death ==
Wallenberg died on 13 September 1982 in his residence, the Villa Täcka Udden on Djurgården in Stockholm, after having been ill since the beginning of the year. The funeral was held in Saint James's Church in Stockholm on 22 September. The bells of the Riddarholmen Church rang the so-called Serafimerringning because Wallenberg was a Knight of the Royal Order of the Seraphim. He had built a private cemetery on Vidbynäs in Södertörn south of Stockholm, which was Wallenberg's residence until his wife's death in 1978. There his urn was buried at the side of the urn that holds the dust of his second wife.

== Awards and decorations ==
=== Swedish ===
- (Sweden) Knight and Commander of the Royal Order of the Seraphim (1974)
- (Sweden) Commander Grand Cross of the Order of the Polar Star (6 June 1956)
- (Sweden) Commander 1st Class of the Order of the Polar Star (6 June 1952)
- (Sweden) Commander of the Order of the Polar Star (6 June 1942)
- (Sweden) Commander Grand Cross of the Order of Vasa (before 1962)
- (Sweden) Commander 1st Class of the Order of Vasa (6 June 1945)
- (Sweden) Commander of the Order of Vasa (6 June 1939)

=== Foreign ===
- Grand Cross of the Order of the Lion of Finland
- (Italy) 1st Class / Knight Grand Cross of the Order of Merit of the Italian Republic (14 June 1966)
- (United Kingdom) Knight Commander of the Most Excellent Order of the British Empire
- (Denmark) Commander 1st Class of the Order of the Dannebrog
- (Norway) Commander with Star of the Order of St. Olav
- Commander 1st Class of the Order of the White Rose of Finland
- (Mexico) Commander 1st Class of the Order of the Aztec Eagle
- (Iceland) Grand Knight's Cross of the Order of the Falcon (15 April 1935)
- Commander of the Order of the Star of Romania
- (Italy) 2nd Class / Grand Officer of the Order of Merit of the Italian Republic (2 June 1953)
- (France) Officer of the Legion of Honour

== Honours ==
- Technical honorary doctorate, Stockholm (1957)
- Member of the Royal Swedish Academy of Engineering Sciences (1957) (1st honorary member 1969)
- Honorary Doctor of Economics, Stockholm (1971)
- Vuorineuvos (1973)

== See also ==
- List of Sweden Davis Cup team representatives

Business positions
Preceded by Jacob Wallenberg	CEO of Stockholms Enskilda Bank (SEB); 1946–1958	Succeeded by Marc Wallenberg
Preceded by Jacob Wallenberg	Chairman of Stockholms Enskilda Bank (SEB); 1969–1971	Succeeded by None
Preceded by None	Chairman of Skandinaviska Enskilda Banken (SEB); 1972–1976	Succeeded by Lars-Erik Thunholm
