= Lars-Erik Thunholm =

Swedish banker and author (1914–2006)

Lars-Erik Thunholm (2 November 1914 – 17 June 2006) was a Swedish banker and author. He was CEO of Skandinaviska Enskilda Banken (SEB) from 1971 to 1976.

== Early life ==
Thunholm was born on 2 November 1914 in Stockholm, Sweden, the son of sea captain Nils Thunholm and his wife Ebba (née Olsson). He worked for AGA Paulista in São Paulo, Brazil from 1933 to 1935 before graduating from the Stockholm School of Economics in 1937. Thunholm worked at Handelsbanken in 1938 and received a master's degree in political sciences in 1941.

== Career ==
Thunholm became an accountant at Handelsbanken in 1946 and he became deputy director of Handelsbanken in 1948 and was director there from 1951 to 1955. Thunholm was CEO of the Federation of Swedish Industries (Sveriges Industriförbund) from 1955 to 1957 and of Skandinaviska Banken from 1957 to 1971. In 1969 he became chairman of the Swedish Bankers' Association (Svenska Bankföreningen) and in 1971 he became chairman of the Association of Swedish Chambers of Commerce (Svenska handelskammarförbundet) and of Stockholm's Chambers of Commerce. Following the merger of the Skandinaviska Banken with Stockholms Enskilda Bank to the Skandinaviska Enskilda Banken (SEB), he became the new bank's first CEO, which he was from 1971 to 1976. Thunholm was then chairman of the board of SEB from 1976 to 1984. In 1982 he became chairman of the Swedish National Committee of the International Chamber of Commerce.

He became a member of the board of the Nordic Museum in 1959 and a member of the Royal Swedish Academy of Engineering Sciences in 1961. Thunholm became a member of the Royal Gustavus Adolphus Academy in 1967. In 1976 he became a member of the Nobel Foundation. Thunholm's reputation for integrity and fearlessness was with him all his life. He came under fire in the 1980s over revelations about the Bofors bribes, because he, as chairman of the Nobel Industries ought to have been transparent, but felt that this was a mass media inflated business, in which India put the blame on Sweden. During the 1980s, Thunholm was financier of the doctor Alf Enerström's noted newspaper campaign against Prime Minister Olof Palme. Thunholm would later in life marry Enerström's former partner, Gio Petré.

When Thunholm resigned as chairman of SEB at age 70 (where he replaced Marcus Wallenberg) he had time to spare for his own writing. Thunholm had always been regarded as well-read and with great literary interests. Now he had to show it through his own writings: in 1991 with a book on the banker Oscar Rydbeck who went bankrupt and ended up in prison in 1936, Oscar Rydbeck och hans tid ("Oscar Rydbeck and his time"), Ivar Kreuger (1995) and the memoirs Flydda tider ("Escaped times") (2005).

== Personal life ==
In 1939 he married May Bruzelli (born 1916), the daughter of Erik Bruzelli and Signe (née Magnusson). He is the father of Eva Thiel and art historian Görel Cavalli-Björkman (born 1941), who was married to bank director Nils Cavalli-Björkman. In 2000, Thunholm married the actress Gio Petré.

== Death ==
Thunholm died on 17 June 2006 and was buried in Lidingö Cemetery.

== Awards ==
- (Sweden) Commander Grand Cross of the Order of the Polar Star (1 December 1973)
- (Sweden) Illis quorum (1994)
- (Portugal) Grand Cross of the Order of Prince Henry (16 November 1984)

== Honours ==
- Honorary Doctor, Umeå University (1968)

== Selected bibliography ==
- Thunholm, Lars-Erik (1991). Oscar Rydbeck och hans tid (in Swedish). Stockholm: Fischer. ISBN 91-7054-659-2. SELIBR 7596432.
- Thunholm, Lars-Erik (1995). Ivar Kreuger (in Swedish). Stockholm: Fischer. ISBN 91-7054-757-2. SELIBR 7596507.
- Thunholm, Lars-Erik (1996). Den stora fusionen (in Swedish). Stockholm: Fischer. ISBN 91-7054-810-2. SELIBR 7596546.
- Thunholm, Lars-Erik (2002). Ivar Kreuger: the match king. Translated by Thiel, George. Stockholm: Fischer. ISBN 91-7054-958-3. SELIBR 8505964.
- Thunholm, Lars-Erik (2005). Flydda tider (in Swedish). Rimbo: Fischer & Co. ISBN 91-85183-17-2. SELIBR 9883259.

Business positions
Preceded by First holder	CEO of Skandinaviska Enskilda Banken (SEB); 1971–1976	Succeeded by Jacob Palmstierna
Preceded by Marcus Wallenberg	Chairman of Skandinaviska Enskilda Banken (SEB); 1976–1984	Succeeded by Curt Olsson
