= WM-data =

Swedish IT consultancy company

- Company type: Public
- Industry: Consulting
- Founded: 1969
- Defunct: 2008
- Fate: Acquired
- Successor: Logica
- Headquarters: Stockholm, Sweden
- Key people: Börje Ekholm (Chairman); Crister Stjernfelt (CEO)
- Number of employees: ~9,000 (2006)

WM-data was a Swedish IT consultancy company based in Stockholm, and was completely incorporated by Logica on 27 February 2008. The company was quoted on the Stockholm Stock Exchange (SSE) as a member of the A-list, but after LogicaCMG's acquisition, WM-data was dequoted. The company was active in the Nordic countries, including Sweden, Norway, Denmark and Finland, and had around 9,000 employees. There were local offices in Estonia and Poland as well, which are now Logica offices. In 2005, it realised a turnover of 10 billion SEK (1.4 billion USD; 1.1 billion EUR).

== History ==
WM-data was founded by Thord Wilkne and Hans Mellström (the W and M in the company's name) in 1969 in Stockholm, Sweden. In 2008 the company was one of Sweden's leading IT companies and had regional offices in numerous cities located in the Nordic countries. The company offered overall solutions in IT related areas. It was divided into three branches: branding, specialist and infrastructure, where its main areas were the secondary sector of industry, commerce and logistics, bank, finance and insurance, telecommunications, public sector, medicine and health care, and utility. The company was acquired by Logica PLC in 2006.

== Market ==
Its main market was the Nordic countries and its main customers were large companies and organisations. The Swedish branch stood for around 65% of the turnover, Denmark 15%, Norway and Finland around 10% each.

== Acquisitions ==
In May 2005, WM-data acquired Atos Origin's operations in Sweden and Norway for approximately 1.33 billion SEK. The parties also agreed to an Enterprise Alliance Agreement to strengthen future cooperations.

In August 2006, British LogicaCMG announced their offer to acquire WM-data's entire share capital. Later, in October, WM-data became a subsidiary of LogicaCMG after 85% of the shareholders agreed to sell their shares. At the time the Nordic region compromised 23% of the group's turnover and was the largest geographic area.
