= Peder Wallenberg =

- Born: Peder Gustav Edvard Clarence Sager; 2 July 1935 (age 90); Stockholm, Sweden
- Occupations: Architect, businessman
- Spouses: Elisabeth Lagerfelt (m. 1966–1972) Ann-Christine Magnusson (m. 1980–1986) Helena Högkvist (m. 1987)
- Parent(s): Jacob Wallenberg (biological father); Madeleine Sager (née Sörensen); John-Henry Sager (stepfather)

Peder Gustav Edvard Clarence Sager Wallenberg (née Sager; born 2 July 1935) is a Swedish businessman, architect, and co-founder of the foundation Carpe Vitam.

Wallenberg's business ventures included hotel resort ownership and management, creation of luxury living centers, stock market investments, and banking.

Wallenberg is the son of Jacob Wallenberg. An illegitimate child, Peder Wallenberg was finally adopted by his father at a late age. When Wallenberg's father died, a legal dispute arose regard the son's claims to the estate.

Peder Wallenberg has eight children from three wives. The oldest son was born in 1967 and the youngest in 1997. Their names in descending order of age are: Fredrik Wallenberg, Marie Wallenberg, Peder Wallenberg, Nicholas Wallenberg, Anna Wallenberg, Peder Wallenberg Jr, Christopher Wallenberg, and Alexander Wallenberg.
