= Investor AB =

Swedish investment and conglomerate holding company

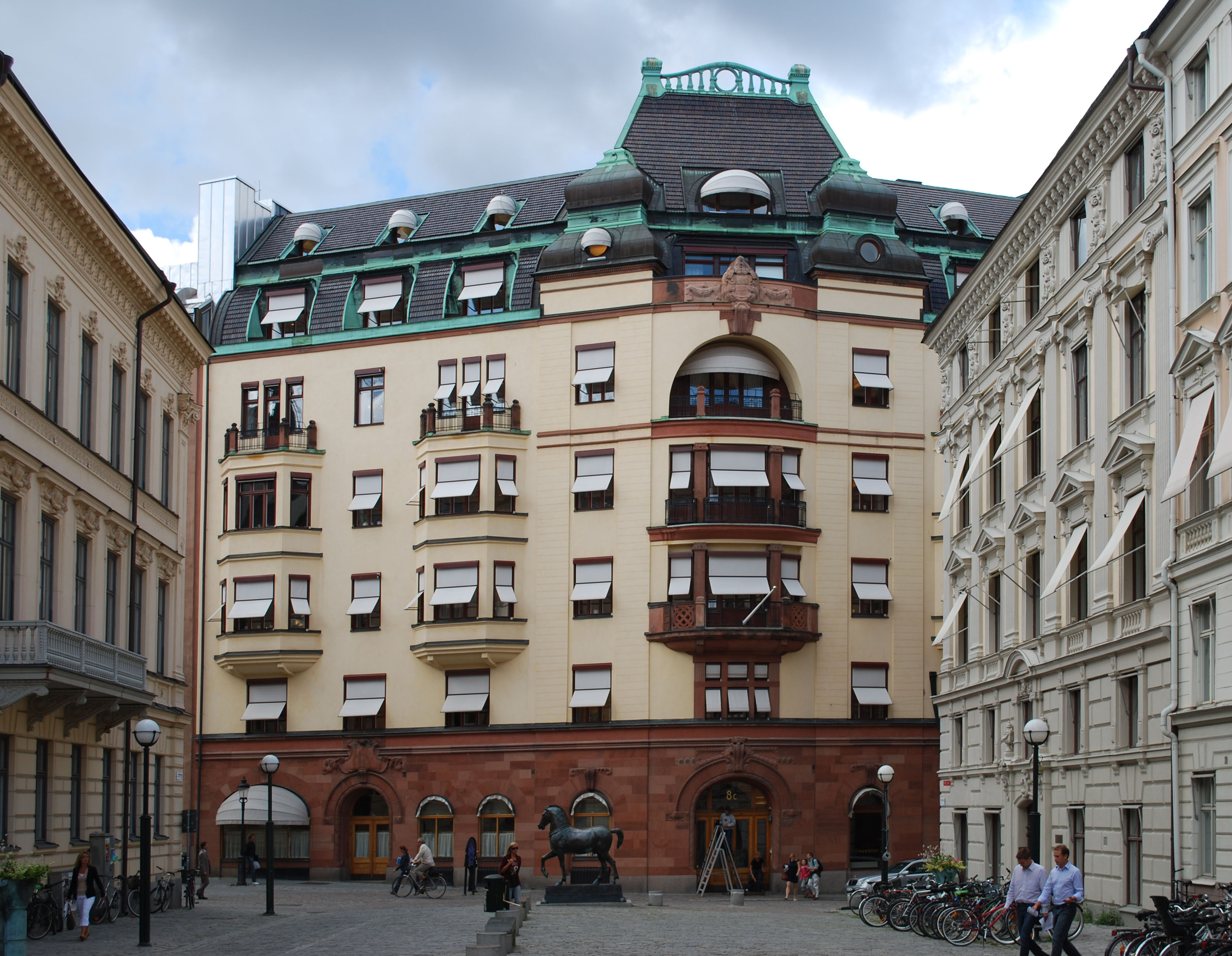
- Investor's global HQ in Stockholm, Sweden
- Company type: Publicly traded Aktiebolag
- Traded as: Nasdaq Stockholm: INVE B; OMX Stockholm 30 component
- ISIN: SE0000107419
- Industry: Industrial holding company
- Founded: 1916; 110 years ago
- Headquarters: Stockholm, Sweden
- Key people: Jacob Wallenberg (chair); Johan Forssell (director & former CEO); Christian Cederholm (CEO)
- Products: Core, private equity, operating and financial investments
- Operating income: ▲231.67 billion kr (2021)
- Net income: ▲227.97 billion kr (2021)
- Total assets: ▲795.54 billion kr (2021)
- Total equity: ▲682.61 billion kr (2021)
- Owner: Wallenberg family (23.3% equity, 50.0% voting)
- Number of employees: 73 (Investor AB only, 2021)
- Website: www.investorab.com

Investor AB is a Swedish investment and holding company, often considered a de facto conglomerate. One of Sweden's largest companies, Investor AB serves as the investment arm of the prominent Swedish Wallenberg family; the family's companies are involved in a variety of industries, of which the primary industries are pharmaceuticals, telecommunications and industry.

Investor AB is Sweden's most valuable publicly traded company; it has major or controlling holdings in several of Sweden's other largest companies. It has numerous investments worldwide through Patricia Industries and EQT AB.

== History ==
Investor AB was established in Stockholm when new Swedish legislation made it more difficult for banks to own stocks in industrial companies on a long-term basis. The shareholdings of the Wallenberg family bank, Stockholms Enskilda Bank, were transferred to Investor AB, a newly formed industrial holding company spun off from the bank, which would serve as the family's investment arm henceforth. The fund operates with a CEO who is not a Wallenberg but is overseen by its chairperson who is a member of the family, currently Jacob Wallenberg. In 2023, it was announced that Johan Forssell would leave the role of CEO in May 2024 after nine years. His replacement was announced as Christian Cederholm who is the current CEO.

== Investments ==
=== Listed companies ===
Investor AB owns significant holdings of the following companies. Ownership shares vary from 3%-35% as of 2022.

- ABB - Provides electrification products, robotics and motion, industrial automation and power grids.
- AstraZeneca - A biopharmaceutical company.
- Atlas Copco - Provides compressors, vacuum and air treatment systems, construction equipment, power tools, and assembly systems.
- Electrolux - Provides household appliances for consumer use.
- Electrolux Professional - food service, beverage and laundry for professional use, spun off from Electrolux AB in 2020.
- Epiroc - mining, infrastructure and natural resources.
- Ericsson - Provides communications technology and services.
- Husqvarna AB - Provides outdoor power products, consumer watering products, cutting equipment, and diamond tools.
- Nasdaq, Inc. - Provides financial services and controls stock exchanges
- Saab - Products for military defense and civil security.
- SEB - A financial services group focusing mainly on the Nordic countries, Germany, and the Baltics.
- Sobi - Biopharmaceutics
- Wärtsilä - marine and power engine development.

=== Patricia Industries ===
Investor AB owns the vast majority of the stock of Patricia Industries, as of 2022. Patricia Industries' key focus is to invest in and develop wholly-owned companies.

- BraunAbility - automotive mobility products
- Laborie - Develops, designs, and distributes innovative capital equipment for the urology and gastroenterology sectors, with complementing and recurring high-volume sales of disposable catheters
- Mölnlycke Health Care - Designs, manufactures, and supplies single use products for managing wounds
- Permobil - powered and manual wheelchairs, as well as cushions and accessories
- Piab - A provider of gripping and moving for automated manufacturing and logistics processes
- Sarnova - A provider of healthcare products to emergency care providers, hospitals, schools, businesses, and federal government agencies
- Advanced Instruments - osmolality testing instrumentation and consumables for the clinical, biopharmaceutical, and food & beverage markets
- Vectura - Develops, owns and manages real estate
- 3 Scandinavia - Provides mobile voice and broadband services in Sweden and Denmark
- Financial Investments - Financial Investments consist of investments in which the investment horizon has not yet been defined

=== Investments in EQT ===
Investments in EQT AB and EQT Funds.

- EQT AB - EQT manages and advises a range of specialized investment funds, and other investment vehicles that invest across the world. As one of EQT's founders in 1994, Investor has invested in most of its funds.

=== Some former holdings ===
- IBX - purchasing services (sold to Capgemini in 2010)
- WM-data - IT services (sold in August 2006)
- Saab Automobile - car manufacturer acquired by General Motors in 2000
- Scania - divested its holding to Volkswagen Group in 2008
- Bredbandsbolaget - a broadband and telecoms provider. This was initially difficult but sold in 2005 to Telenor for a profit.
- OMX - financial services company (sold in May 2007 to Nasdaq)
