= Wasp (disambiguation) =

A wasp is a type of flying insect.

Wasp may also refer to:

== Art, entertainment, and media ==
=== Fictional entities ===
==== In Marvel Comics and Marvel Entertainment ====
- Several Marvel Comics characters have donned the Wasp mantle including:
  - Wasp (character), introduced in 1963
  - Nadia van Dyne, introduced in 2016 as the Unstoppable Wasp
- Two Marvel Cinematic Universe characters have donned the mantle:
  - Hope van Dyne
  - Janet van Dyne (Marvel Cinematic Universe), Hope's mother
    - Wasp suit (Marvel Cinematic Universe)

==== Others ====
- Lisbeth Salander, a character in the Millennium series nicknamed Wasp
- Waspinator or Wasp, several Transformers characters
- World Aquanaut Security Patrol, an organization in the television series Stingray

=== Films ===
- Wasp (2003 film), a film by Andrea Arnold
- Wasp (2015 film), a British-French film
- The Wasp (1915 film), a short by B. Reeves Eason
- The Wasp (1918 film), a lost silent film comedy drama
- The Wasp (2024 film), a British thriller film

=== Literature ===
- Wasp (novel), a novel by Eric Frank Russell
- The Wasps, a comic play by Aristophanes

=== Music ===
- W.A.S.P. (band), an American rock/metal band
  - W.A.S.P. (album), their 1984 self-titled album
- "Wasp", a song by Black Sabbath from the album Black Sabbath
- Wasp (album), a 1980 album by Shaun Cassidy
- "W.A.S.P.", a song from the Dayglo Abortions album, Two Dogs Fucking
- The Wasps (Vaughan Williams), a 1909 suite for orchestra composed by Ralph Vaughan Williams
- "The WASP (Texas Radio and the Big Beat)", a song by The Doors from the album L.A. Woman
- EDP Wasp, a monophonic synthesizer by Electronic Dream Plant
- WASP, a library music ensemble founded by Steve Gray

=== Periodicals ===
- The Wasp (magazine), a 19th-century San Francisco magazine
- The Wasp (newspaper), a 19th-century newspaper published in Nauvoo, Illinois

=== Radio ===
- WASP-LP, a low-power radio station (104.5 FM) licensed to serve Huntington, West Virginia, United States
- WASP (AM), a defunct radio station (1130 AM) formerly licensed to serve Brownsville, Pennsylvania, United States

== Science and technology ==
=== Information technology ===
- Web Standards Project
- WAsP, Wind Atlas Analysis and Application Program
- Wireless application service provider

=== Weapons ===
- AGM-124 Wasp, an American experimental air-to-ground anti-tank missile
- Wasp 58, a recoilless rocket launcher

=== Other uses in science and technology ===
- Wiskott–Aldrich syndrome protein
- Wide Angle Search for Planets (WASP), a British group searching for extra-solar planets

== Sport ==
- Wasps FC, an amateur English rugby union club
- Wasps Ladies, an English women's rugby union club
- Wasps RFC, a professional English rugby union club based in the Coventry area (known from 1999 to 2014 as London Wasps)
- York Wasps, former English rugby league club
- Chalfont Wasps F.C., English football club
- Durham Wasps, former British ice–hockey team
- Newport Wasps, British speedway team
- Emory and Henry Wasps, NCAA Division III intercollegiate sport team
- WASP (cricket calculation tool), an algorithm used in limited overs cricket matches to predict the outcome of games

== Transportation ==
=== Aviation ===
- ABC Wasp, a British World War I aero engine by ABC Motors
- AeroVironment Wasp III, unmanned aerial vehicle (UAV) developed for United States Air Force special forces
- Airspeed Queen Wasp, British unmanned target-aircraft
- Curtiss 18 Wasp, a little-used American triplane fighter of World War I
- Pratt & Whitney Wasp series, a series of piston engines common in the 1930s and 1940s
- Westland Wasp, a British-built light shipborne helicopter
- Women Airforce Service Pilots, World War II American female aviators
- Williams Aerial Systems Platform, from Williams International
- Wasp Flight Systems, a British powered hang glider manufacturer
  - Wasp SP Mk2, a British powered hang glider design

=== Land ===
- Hudson Wasp, 1950s, American automobile
- Martin Wasp, 1910s and 20s, American automobile
- Wasp Motorcycles, British motorcycle and sidecar manufacturer
- Wasp, a variant of the Universal Carrier armored vehicle that was armed with a flamethrower
- ICNG (Wasp), 2020s, Passenger rail vehicle built for NS & SNCB

=== Ships ===
- HMS Wasp, several ships of the Royal Navy
- USS Wasp, several ships of the United States Navy
- Wasp-class amphibious assault ship, ships of the United States Navy
- Wasp (1809 ship), a ship that made a whaling voyage in the 1820s
- Wasp (1776 ship), British slaving vessel

== Other uses ==
- Wasp, Pleasants County, West Virginia, a community in the United States
- Wallenberg AI, Autonomous Systems and Software Program (WASP), Sweden’s largest individual research program
- White Anglo-Saxon Protestants, a sociological group in the United States
- Workers and Socialist Party, a South African political party

== See also ==
- Wasp waist, a silhouette given by a style of corset
- WWASP, World Wide Association of Specialty Programs
