= Cermet =

Composite formed from the mixture of ceramic and metallic materials

A cermet is a composite material composed of ceramic and metal materials.

A cermet can combine attractive properties of both a ceramic, such as high temperature resistance and hardness, and those of a metal, such as the ability to undergo plastic deformation. The metal is used as a binder for an oxide, boride, or carbide. Generally, the metallic elements used are nickel, molybdenum, and cobalt. Depending on the physical structure of the material, cermets can also be metal matrix composites, but cermets are usually less than 20% metal by volume.

Cermets are used in the manufacture of resistors (especially potentiometers), capacitors, and other electronic components which may experience high temperature.

Cermets are used instead of tungsten carbide in saws and other brazed tools due to their superior wear and corrosion properties. Titanium nitride (TiN), titanium carbonitride (TiCN), titanium carbide (TiC) and similar can be brazed like tungsten carbide if properly prepared, however they require special handling during grinding.

Composites of MAX phases, an emerging class of ternary carbides or nitrides with aluminium or titanium alloys have been studied since 2006 as high-value materials exhibiting favourable properties of ceramics in terms of hardness and compressive strength alongside ductility and fracture toughness typically associated with metals. Such cermet materials, including aluminium-MAX phase composites, have potential applications in automotive and aerospace applications.

Some types of cermets are also being considered for use as spacecraft shielding, as they resist the high-velocity impacts of micrometeoroids and orbital debris much more effectively than more traditional spacecraft materials, such as aluminum and other metals.

== Terminology and classification ==
In the materials-science literature, the term cermet is used in both a broad and a narrow sense. In the broad sense, it refers to ceramic-metal composites in which the ceramic phase is dominant and the metal phase acts mainly as a binder; by this usage, cemented carbides such as WC-Co may be treated as cermets.

In cutting-tool practice, however, the term is often used more narrowly for TiC- and especially Ti(C,N)-based materials with Ni and/or Co binders, while WC-Co grades are commonly discussed separately as cemented carbides or hardmetals. This difference in usage helps explain why the boundary between cermet, hardmetal, and cemented carbide is not always treated consistently in the literature.

== History ==
The history of cermet-like materials predates the coining of the term cermet. Cemented carbide based on WC with a Co binder was developed at Osram in 1923 and commercialized by Krupp in 1927 under the trade name Widia. Within the following decade, non-WC hardmetals also appeared, including TaC-Ni materials sold in the United States as Ramet in 1930 and TiC-Mo_{2}C-Ni-Cr grades commercialized in Austria as Titanit in 1931. These early developments help explain why later sources sometimes discuss the histories of hardmetals, cemented carbides, and cermets together.

After World War II, the need to develop high temperature and high stress-resistant materials became clear. During the war, German scientists developed oxide base cermets as substitutes for alloys. They saw a use for this for the high-temperature sections of new jet engines, as well as high temperature turbine blades. Today, ceramics are routinely implemented in the combustor part of jet engines, because it provides a heat-resistant chamber. Ceramic turbine blades have also been developed. These blades are lighter than steel and allow for greater rotational acceleration (“spool-up time”) of the blade assemblies.

The United States Air Force saw potential in the material technology and became one of the principal sponsors for various research programs in the US. Some of the first universities to research were Ohio State University, University of Illinois, and Rutgers University.

The word cermet was actually coined by the United States Air Force, the idea being that they are a combination of two materials, a ceramic and a metal. Ceramics possess basic physical properties such as a high melting point, chemical stability, and especially oxidation resistance. Basic physical properties of metals include ductility, high strength, and high thermal conductivity.

The first ceramic metal material developed used magnesium oxide (MgO), beryllium oxide (BeO), and aluminum oxide (Al_{2}O_{3}) for the ceramic part. Emphasis on high stress rupture strengths was around 980 °C. Ohio State University was the first to develop Al_{2}O_{3} based cermets with high stress rupture strengths around 1200 °C. Kennametal, a metal-working and tool company based in Latrobe, Pennsylvania, developed the first titanium carbide cermet with a 19 megapascals (2,800 psi) and 100-hour stress-to-rupture strength at 980 °C. Jet engines operate at this temperature and further research was invested on using these materials for components.

Quality control in manufacturing these ceramic metal composites was hard to standardize. Production had to be kept to small batches and within these batches, the properties varied greatly. Failure of the material was usually a result of undetected flaws usually nucleated during processing.

The existing technology in the 1950s reached a limit for jet engines where little more could be improved. Subsequently, engine manufactures were reluctant to develop ceramic metal engines. Interest was renewed in the 1960s when silicon nitride and silicon carbide were studied more closely. Both materials possessed better thermal shock resistance, high strength, and moderate thermal conductivity.

=== Cermet production, Helipot Division of Beckman Instruments, 1966 ===
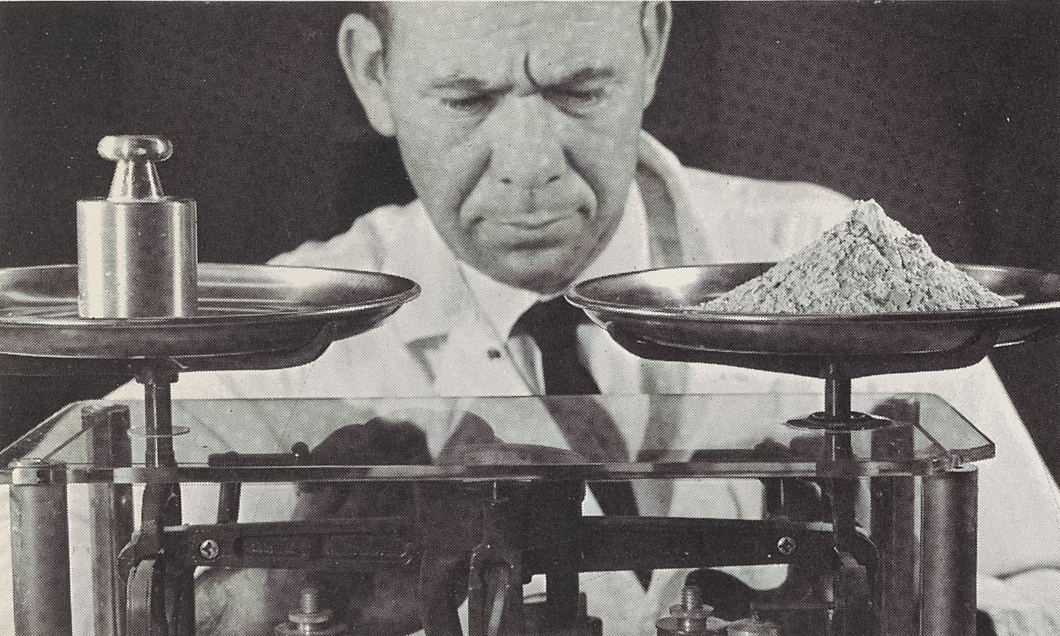
1. Steatite Ingredients Being Weighed

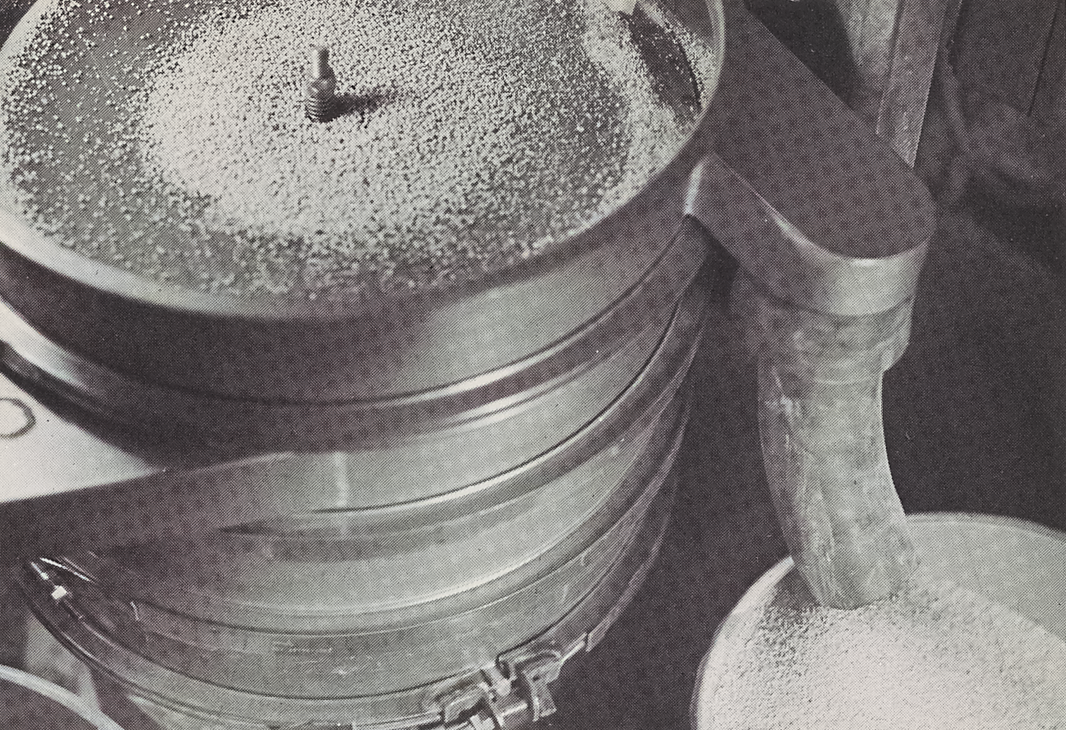
2. Steatite Granulation Process

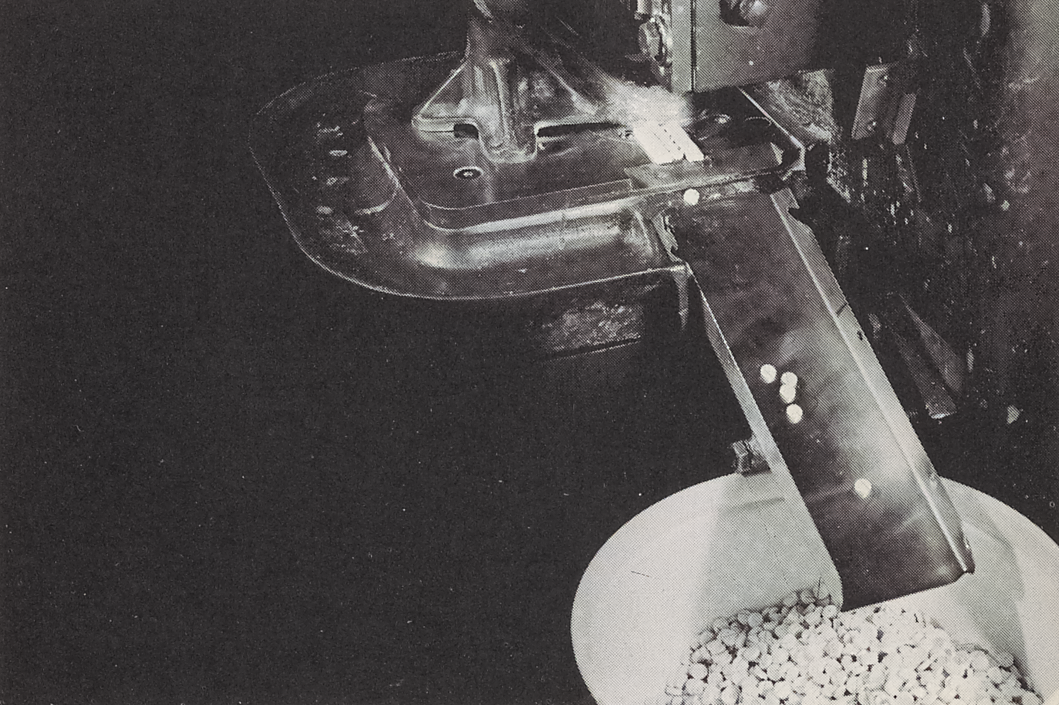
3. Steatite Chip Pressing

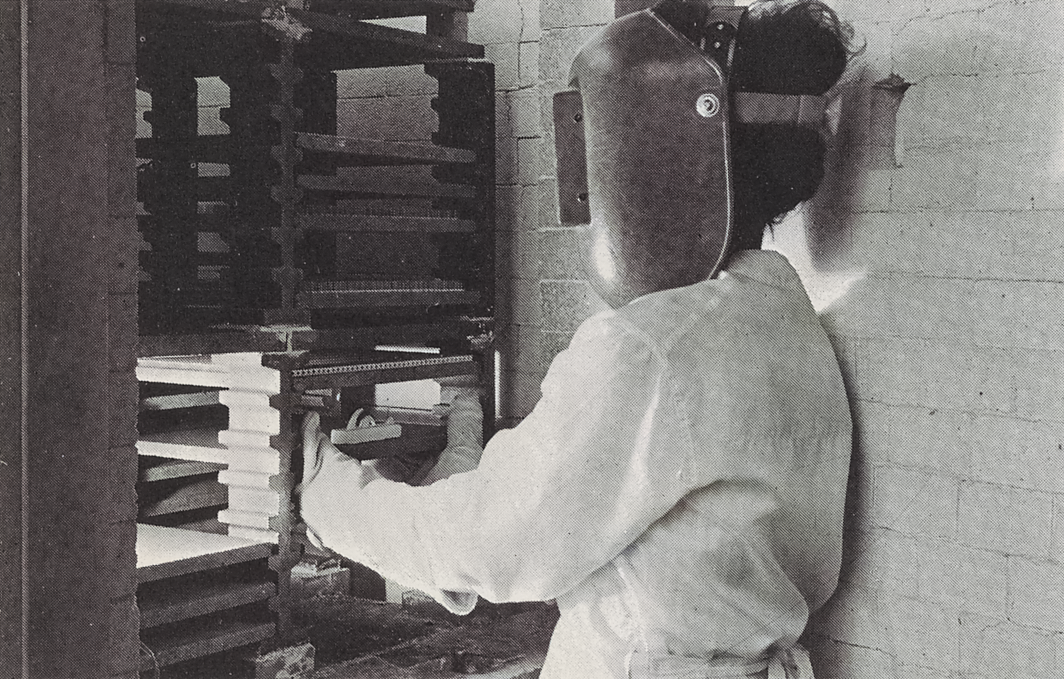
4. High Temperature Firing of Steatite Chip

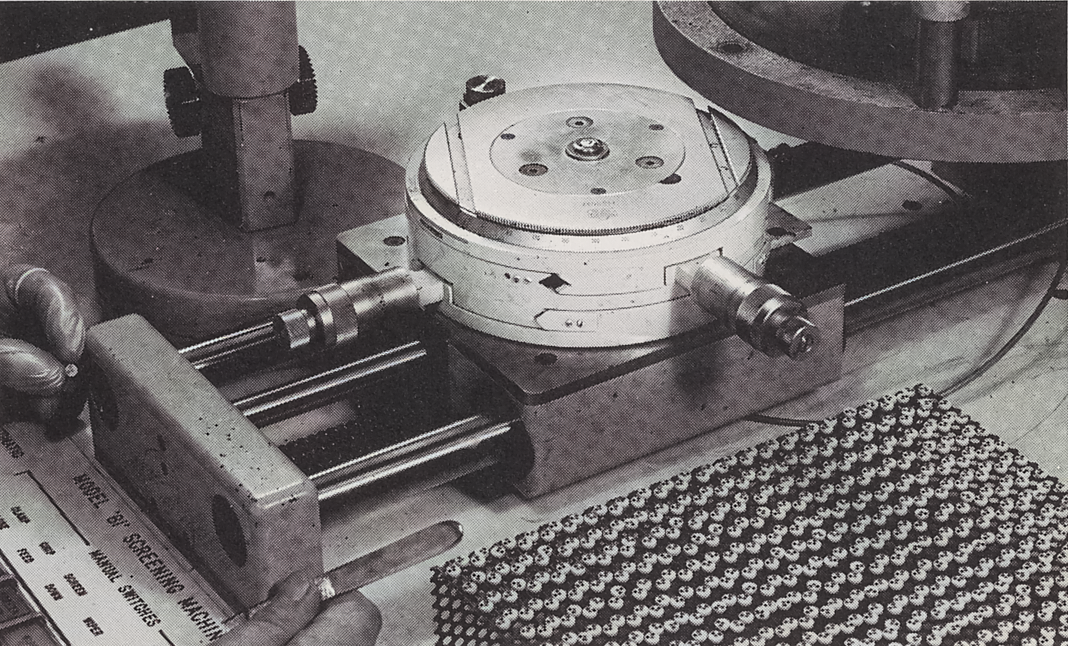
5. Beckman Model 61 Potentiometer (Cermet Screening)

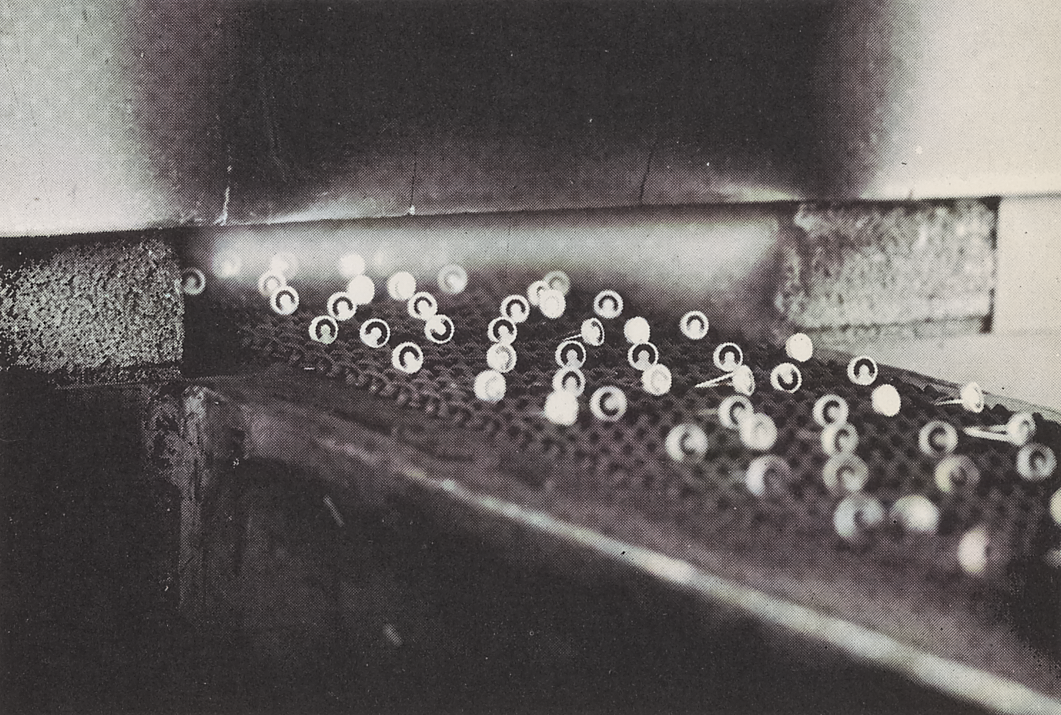
6. Final Firing of Cermet

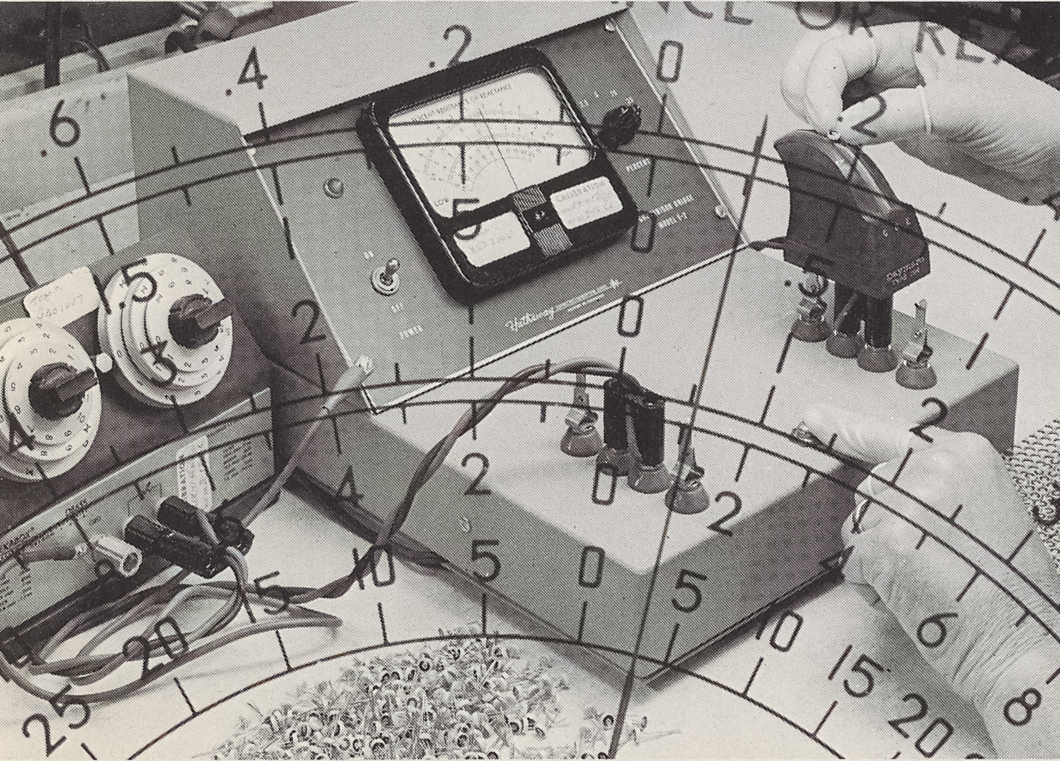
7. Checking electrical resistance

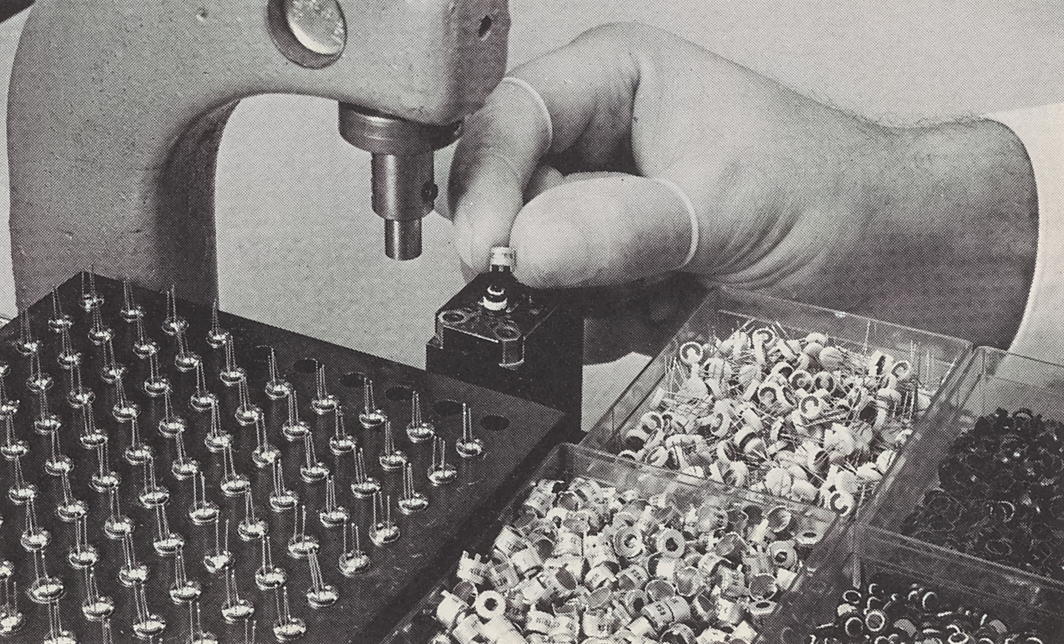
8. Final Assembly

== Applications ==
=== Cutting tools and wear-resistant parts ===
Ti(C,N)-based cermets with Ni and/or Co binders are widely used in cutting and grinding tools because of their high hardness, wear resistance, relatively low coefficient of friction, and chemical stability. They are among the most important cermet systems in metal machining applications.

WC-based cermets and hardmetals are also used in demanding wear applications such as machining tools, drilling components, wire-drawing dies, punch tools, and corrosion- or wear-resistant coatings. More recently, cermets have also been explored in additive manufacturing, including selective laser sintering/melting, LENS, binder-jet printing, and direct-ink-write or robocasting routes for bulk parts.

=== Ceramic-to-metal joints and seals ===
Cermets were first used extensively in ceramic-to-metal joint applications. Construction of vacuum tubes was one of the first critical systems, with the electronics industry employing and developing such seals. German scientists recognized that vacuum tubes with improved performance and reliability could be produced by substituting ceramics for glass. Ceramic tubes can be outgassed at higher temperatures. Because of the high-temperature seal, ceramic tubes withstand higher temperatures than glass tubes. Ceramic tubes are also mechanically stronger and less sensitive to thermal shock than glass tubes. Today, cermet vacuum tube coatings have proved to be key to solar hot water systems.

Ceramic-to-metal mechanical seals have also been used. Traditionally they have been used in fuel cells and other devices that convert chemical, nuclear, or thermionic energy to electricity. The ceramic-to-metal seal is required to isolate the electrical sections of turbine-driven generators designed to operate in corrosive liquid-metal vapors.

=== Bioceramics ===
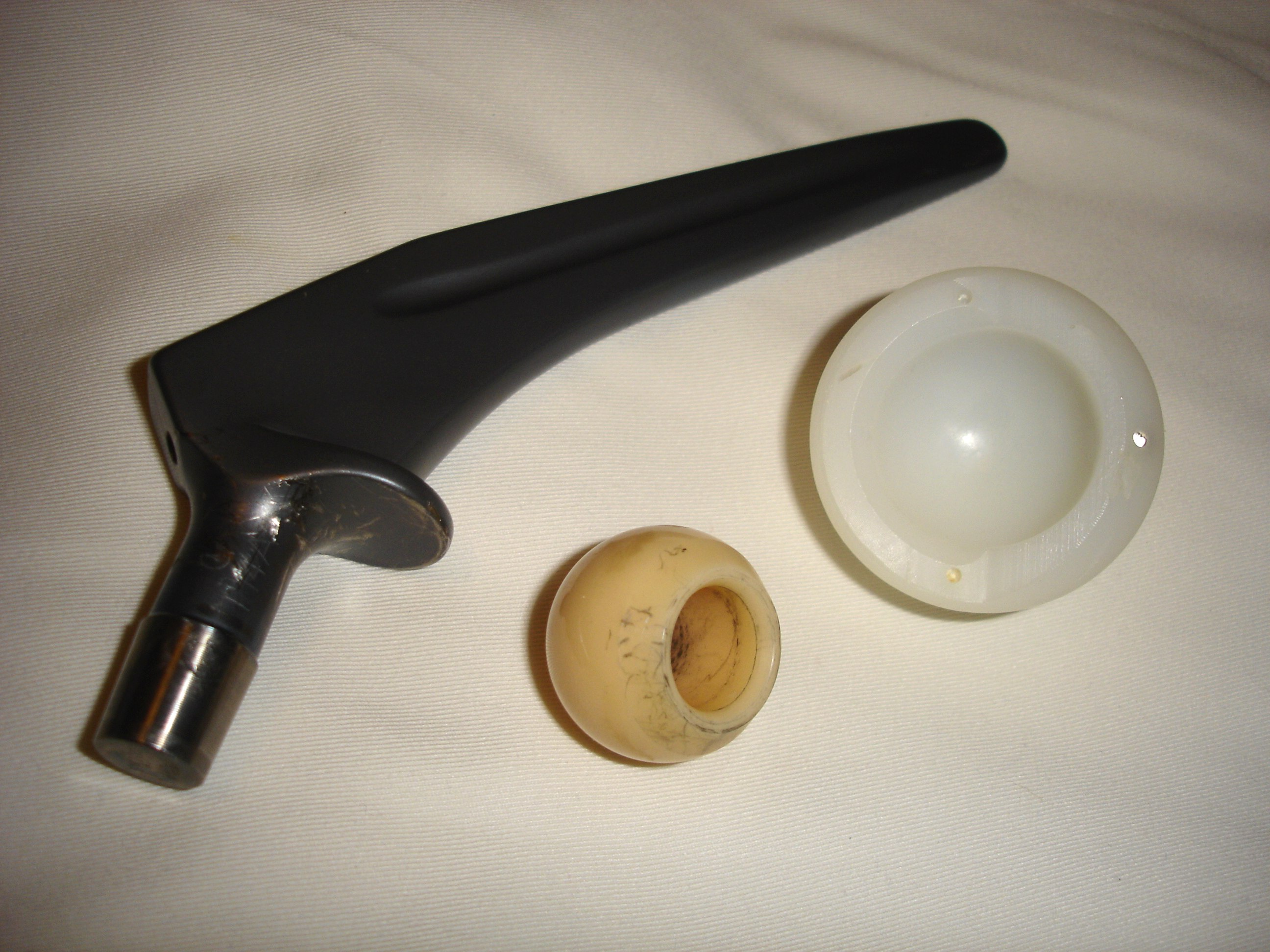

Bioceramics play an extensive role in biomedical materials. The development of these materials and diversity of manufacturing techniques has broadened the applications that can be used in the human body. They can be in the form of thin layers on metallic implants, composites with a polymer component, or even just porous networks. These materials work well within the human body for several reasons. They are inert, and because they are resorbable and active, the materials can remain in the body unchanged. They can also dissolve and actively take part in physiological processes, for example, when hydroxylapatite, a material chemically similar to bone structure, can integrate and help bone grow into it. Common materials used for bioceramics include alumina, zirconia, calcium phosphate, glass ceramics, and pyrolytic carbons.

One important use of bioceramics is in hip replacement surgery. The materials used for the replacement hip joints were usually metals such as titanium, with the hip socket usually lined with plastic. The multiaxial ball was tough metal ball but was eventually replaced with a longer-lasting ceramic ball. This reduced the roughening associated with the metal wall against the plastic lining of the artificial hip socket. The use of ceramic implants extended the life of the hip replacement parts.

Dental cermets are also used in dentistry as a material for fillings and prostheses.

=== Transportation ===
Ceramic parts have been used in conjunction with metal parts as friction materials for brakes and clutches.

=== Electrical heaters ===
Cermets are used as heating elements in electric resistance heaters. One construction technique starts with the cermet material formulated as an ink which is printed on a substrate then cured with heat. This technique allows manufacture of complex shapes of heating elements. Examples of applications for cermet heating elements include thermostat heaters, heat sources for bottle sterilization, coffee carafe warmers, heaters for oven control, and laser printer fuser heaters.

=== Other applications ===
The United States Army and British Army have had extensive research in the development of cermets. These include the development of lightweight ceramic projectile-proof armor for soldiers and also Chobham armor.

Cermets are used in machining on cutting tools, and as the ring material in high-quality line guides for fishing rods.

A cermet of depleted fissile material (e.g. uranium, plutonium) and sodalite has been researched for its benefits in the storage of nuclear waste. Similar composites (CerMet fuel) have also been researched for use as a fuel form for nuclear reactors and nuclear thermal rockets.

As nanostructured cermet, this material is used in the optical field, such as solar absorbers/selective surface. Thanks to the size of the particles (~5 nm), surface plasmons on the metallic particles are generated and enable the heat transmission.

In 2026, an Apple-brokered partnership between Elysis and Alcoa produced a cermet that replaces the carbon-based anode in the Hall–Héroult aluminum production process, which replaced CO_{2} emissions with O_{2}.

== See also ==
- Glidcop
- Nuclear fuel
- Nuclear fuel cycle
