= Steve Stern =

Steve or Steven Stern may refer to:

- Steve Stern (writer), American author
- Steve Stern (politician), member of the New York State Assembly
- Steven Stern (mathematician), Australian mathematician and statistician
- Steven Hilliard Stern, Canadian television and documentary director, producer and writer
