= FAM AB =

Swedish AMC

Foundation Asset Management AB (FAM AB) is a Swedish asset management company, founded by the three largest Wallenberg foundations in order to manage their assets, by means of direct ownership as well as through management and consultancy agreements. It is chaired by Marcus Wallenberg who also chairs Wallenberg Investments AB, which is the holding company that directly owns FAM AB.

These foundations and their donations are administered and handled through a subsidiary. The Wallenberg Foundations refers to 16 non-profit foundations founded by members of the Wallenberg family which makeup what is described in Sweden as the Wallenberg ecosystem.

== Ownership and structure ==
FAM AB is owned by Wallenberg Investments AB, a company that is fully owned by the three largest Wallenberg foundations consisting of the following:

- The Knut and Alice Wallenberg Foundation, founded 1917.
- The Marianne and Marcus Wallenberg Foundation, founded 1963.
- The Marcus and Amalia Wallenberg Foundation, founded 1960.

The Wallenberg Foundations benefit from all dividends earned by Wallenberg Investments AB, of which 80% is then funneled in grants by the foundations and 20% is reinvested via Wallenberg Investments AB.

The Wallenbergs, through FAM AB, were major shareholders of Swedish flag carrier SAS since 1946, controlling a stake of 7.5% of the company. Their stake in the company ended as part of the airline's restructuring after the COVID-19.

== Largest holdings as of 31 December 2023 ==
Sources:

- SKF – SEK 13.7 billion (15% stake, 29% voting rights)
- Stora Enso – SEK 11.1 billion (10.2% stake, 27.3% voting rights)
- Munters – SEK 8.4 billion (28% stake and voting rights)
- Kopparfors Skogar – SEK 10 billion (100% stake and voting rights)
- Höganäs – SEK 5.8 billion (50.0% stake, 50.0% voting rights)
- Grand Group – Unlisted (100% stake and voting rights)

Full list of holdings.
