= Tony Lewis (mathematician) =

English mathematician (1942–2020)

Anthony John Lewis MBE
- Born: 25 February 1942; Bolton, Lancashire
- Died: 15 March 2020 (aged 78)
- Education: Kirkham Grammar School
- Alma mater: University of Sheffield
- Occupation: Mathematician
- Known for: Duckworth–Lewis method

Anthony John Lewis MBE (25 February 1942 – 15 March 2020) was a mathematician who, along with Frank Duckworth, developed the Duckworth–Lewis method of resetting targets in limited-overs cricket matches interrupted by weather or other circumstances.

== Personal life ==
Lewis was born in Bolton, Lancashire, but spent his formative years in Grimsargh, near Preston. He attended Kirkham Grammar School and graduated from Sheffield University with a degree in Mathematics and Statistics.

Lewis was appointed Member of the Order of the British Empire (MBE) in the 2010 Birthday Honours.

Lewis died on 15 March 2020, aged 78.

== Career ==
Lewis was formerly a lecturer at the University of the West of England (UWE). In January 2008, he retired as a lecturer in Quantitative Research Methods from Oxford Brookes University.

He was also a former chairman of the Western Operational Research Society and was a keynote speaker at the Second IMA International Conference on Mathematics in Sport in 2009. Lewis also undertook various consultancy roles in England and Australia.

=== Duckworth-Lewis Method ===
In the 1980s, Frank Duckworth had proposed a method of resetting targets in interrupted limited-overs cricket matches. After the 1992 Cricket World Cup, commentator Christopher Martin-Jenkins asked for a better calculation system. Lewis read Duckworth's 1992 paper Fair Play in Foul Weather and together they devised the Duckworth-Lewis Method. In 2014, Steven Stern became custodian of the method, and it was renamed the Duckworth–Lewis–Stern method.
