= Helen Hogan =

New Zealand educator and researcher (1923–2025)

- Born: Helen Merrick Watson; 29 September 1923; Christchurch, New Zealand
- Died: 1 January 2025 (aged 101); Christchurch, New Zealand
- Occupations: Educator; anthologist; researcher
- Spouse: Denis Hogan (m. 1957; died 2006)
- Children: 2

Academic background
- Education: University of Canterbury
- Thesis: Stories of travel: He kōrero ēnei mō te haerenga (1994)
- Doctoral advisor: Margaret Orbell

Academic work
- Discipline: Māori and Moriori studies; oral history

Helen Merrick Hogan (née Watson; 29 September 1923 – 1 January 2025) was a New Zealand teacher, academic and researcher. She was known for her work in Māori and Moriori studies, oral history and literary anthologies.

== Early life, family and education ==
Hogan was born Helen Merrick Watson in Christchurch on 29 September 1923. She was the daughter of William Davie Watson, a service-station proprietor, and Charlotte Amelia Watson (née Smith), a Karitane nurse. She was educated at Christchurch Girls' High School where she was dux in 1942. She want on to study at Canterbury University College, graduating with a Bachelor of Arts degree with second-class honours in 1946, and a Master of Arts degree in English and history, also with second-class honours, in 1949.

Watson learned music from a young age, passing examinations for ATCL (teaching diploma) in 1941. She later gave private music lessons, teaching music theory and piano, and played in the Christchurch Symphony Orchestra.

In 1956, Watson became engaged to Denis Hogan, an analytical chemist who became a professor at the University of Canterbury. They married the following year. The couple had two children. Her son Seamus (1962–2015) was an economist and one of the developers of the WASP prediction tool used in limited-overs cricket matches.

== Teaching career ==
After earning a teaching diploma at the Auckland Teachers' College, Watson taught at Avonside Girls' High School in Christchurch for six years, with a year's break in Australia in 1953 when she gained further teaching experience and studied playing the oboe at the Sydney Conservatorium of Music.

After her marriage, Hogan taught at Darfield High School. After a year off to have her first child, she then became a foundation staff member at Hillmorton High School in 1961. According to Hogan, she was "not too hot on housekeeping", so she used her salary to pay for a housekeeper. She worked at Hillmorton for 12 years, rising to become head of English as well as the teacher-librarian in charge of the school's new library in 1969.

As an English teacher, Hogan observed that her students often wrote better poems after being exposed to other people's poetry. As a result, in 1971 she edited and published her first poetry anthology, Nowhere Far from the Sea, specifically for secondary-school students. The book contained poems by both well-known and lesser-known New Zealand poets as well as a poem by one of her students.

== Academic work and Māori studies ==
At the end of 1971, Hogan was appointed as a lecturer in English at Christchurch Teachers' College. While there, she wrote six-week poetry reading and learning units for secondary-school pupils.

After the success of her first anthology, which sold out, Hogan wrote to the heads of English at all of New Zealand's secondary schools asking them to submit their students' work for possible inclusion in future anthologies. Over the following years, she received between 1,400 and 3,000 poems annually and selected around 100 examples for each of seven anthologies that were published from 1973 to 1980. Among the children whose work appeared in Hogan's anthologies that went on to become notable writers were Steve Braunias and Andrew Johnston.

After retiring, Hogan studied the Māori language through the Correspondence School. She subsequently undertook doctoral studies with Margaret Orbell at the University of Canterbury. Her PhD thesis, "Stories of travel: He kōrero ēnei mō te haerenga", published in 1994, examined 14 Māori-language travel accounts written between 1844 and 1910.

Hogan went on to write three books: Renata's Journey: Ko te Haerenga o Renata, published in 1994, an annotated translation of Rēnata Kawepō's account of his travels in 1843–1844; Hikurangi ki Homburg: Henare Kohere and Terei Ngatai with the Maori Coronation Contingent 1902 (1997), a translation and commentary of the travel writings of Hēnare Kōhere and Terei Ngatai recounting their trip to Britain and Europe in 1902'; and Bravo, Neu Zeeland – Two Māori in Vienna 1859–1860, a translation and commentary of the travel diary written by Hemara Te Rerehau and Wiremu Toetoe of their visit to Vienna in 1859–1860, first published in 2003 with a new edition in 2022. Hogan's book, Renata's Journey: Ko te Haerenga o Renata, published in 1994, was listed in Books of Mana as one of the 180 most significant works of Māori-authored non-fiction.

Hogan worked with the historian Michael King. She also transcribed and prepared manuscripts on Moriori genealogies and traditions which she based on notes collected by Rēweti Kōhere. These manuscripts are held by the National Library of New Zealand.

In 1997, Hogan recorded oral history interviews with women associated with the University of Canterbury. Tapes of the interviews are held in the New Zealand Federation of University Women collection at Christchurch City Libraries.

== Death ==
Hogan died on 1 January 2025, aged 101, at a retirement village in the Christchurch suburb of Beckenham. She had been predeceased by her husband, Denis Hogan, in 2006.
