= Höganäs AB =

Swedish multinational company

- Type: Aktiebolag
- Industry: Powder Metallurgy
- Founded: 1797
- Founder: Count Eric Ruuth
- Headquarters: Bruksgatan 35, Höganäs, Sweden
- Area served: Worldwide
- Key people: Henrik Ager (President & CEO)
- Revenue: ▲SEK 6671 million (2010)
- Operating income: ▲SEK 1114 million (2010)
- Net income: ▲SEK 804 million (2010)
- Total assets: ▲SEK 5667 million (2010)
- Total equity: ▲SEK 3239 million (2010)
- Divisions: Hoganas Brasil; Hoganas China; Hoganas Japan; Hoganas Korea; North American Höganäs; Hoganas East Europe Hoganas India
- Website: www.hoganas.com

Höganäs AB is a Swedish company which is the world's largest producer of powdered metals. Based in Höganäs, it develops and markets powders for customers in metallurgical industries.

The company's portfolio of products and services includes sintered components, electromagnetic applications, brazing, chemical and metallurgical, hot polymer filtration, iron fortification, friction, Glidcop, sintered stainless steel filters, surface coating and welding.

Höganäs AB is operational worldwide through a number of subsidiaries, including Höganäs HOGAP AB, Höganäs Japan K.K, Höganäs East Europe LLC, Höganäs France S.A.S, Höganäs Italia S.r.I and North American Höganäs Holdings Inc. among others.

== History ==
The company was founded in 1797 as a coal mine by Count Eric Ruuth. It also made refractory and salt glazed ceramics.

In the early 20th century, Höganäs developed the Höganäs Method, considered the most effective method of producing sponge iron powder by reducing iron ore with coke, lime, and clay. This method laid the foundation for the company's specialization in metal powders. In 1946, it introduced its first iron powder production plant to serve the post-war industrial market.

Höganäs AB was originally listed on the OMX Stockholm Stock Exchange in 7 April 1994. It was taken private in 2013. This move was facilitated by a joint takeover by two Swedish family-run holding companies, Lindéngruppen and the Wallenberg foundations through FAM AB, with each owning 50% of the company. The foundations stated that privatization allowed Höganäs to focus on long-term strategic goals without the pressure of quarterly financial reporting to public shareholders.

As of 2022, the company has 3,000 customers in 75 countries and has a range of more than 3,500 products, mostly customer specific, with sales offices or production in 16 different countries. The company owns around 800 patents, has 2,400 employees, and reported turnover of approximately $1 billion USD in 2021.

The company’s products are found in a series of application areas including structural components for the automotive industry, metal surface coatings and iron fortification of food.

The Swedish iron ore producer LKAB has been one of the company's suppliers since 1909. In 2024, the company was awarded "Partner of the Year" by Mitsubishi Heavy Industries for its supply of thermal spray powders to the company.

== See also ==
- Powder metallurgy
- Injection molding
