= Steven Stern (mathematician) =

Professor of Data Science

Steven Stern is a Professor of Data Science at the Bond Business School, Bond University, Gold Coast, Australia. He is the current custodian of Duckworth–Lewis method (D/L method), the mathematical formulation designed to calculate the target score for the team batting second in a limited overs cricket match interrupted by weather or other circumstances. The D/L method was devised by two English statisticians, Frank Duckworth and Tony Lewis.

Since November 2014, after the retirement of Frank Duckworth and Tony Lewis, Steven Stern has been taking care of maintenance and upgrades in this methodology. Duckworth–Lewis method has been renamed as Duckworth-Lewis-Stern (or DLS) method.

Stern has previously been the ABS Professor of Statistics at Queensland University of Technology.
