= Oxide dispersion-strengthened alloy =

Composite material

Oxide dispersion-strengthened alloys (ODS) are alloys that consist of a metal matrix with small oxide particles dispersed within it. They have high heat resistance, strength, and ductility. Alloys of nickel are the most common but, but the category also includes iron and aluminum alloys. More recently, work has been done to explore Tungsten alloys for use in fusion environments and plasma facing materials. While typically an oxide phase is most commonly used, some alloys have used the ODS moniker while containing carbides, or a mix of oxides and carbides.

== Applications ==
Applications include high-temperature turbine blades and heat-exchanger tubing, while steels are used in nuclear fission applications. ODS materials are used on spacecraft to protect the vehicle, especially during re-entry. Noble-metal ODS alloys, such as platinum-based alloys, are used in glass production.

Tungsten is a top plasma-facing component choice for many magnetically confined fusion reactors. Due to the high displacements per atom, or DPA, that are expected in fusion environments due to neutron damage, Helium and Hydrogen embrittlement, and plasma sputtering, engineers have sought to design a material to effectively operate under extreme conditions for economically relevant periods of time. ODS alloys offer one solution to this problem, however, the sink strength required for fusion applications can be up to a order of magnitude greater than in new Generation IV reactors, requiring sink strengths in the 10^{16}/m^{2} range.

The sink strength of a material, denoted by k^{2}, is given by:

$k^2=4 \pi R \rho Y$

where:

- R – the radius of the sink, typically representing the size of dislocations, voids, or precipitates that act as sinks for point defects.
- ρ – the number density of sinks, which is the number of sinks per unit volume of the material.
- Y – a geometrical factor that accounts for the specific shape or distribution of sinks in the material.

In fusion applications, oxides offer an advantage over other dispersoids as they can be more chemically stable by inherent protection against further oxidation and resistance to grain coarsening.

== Mechanism ==
Oxide dispersion strengthening is based on incoherency of the oxide particles within the lattice of the material. Coherent particles have a continuous lattice plane from the matrix to the particles, whereas incoherent particles do not have this continuity and therefore both lattice planes end at the interface. This mismatch in interfaces results in a high interfacial energy, which impedes dislocation. ,The oxide particles remain stable within the matrix, helping to inhibit creep. This particle stability confers minimal dimensional change, reduced embrittlement, negligible degradation of mechanical properties, stable interparticle spacing, and overall resistance to coarsening or microstructural change at elevated temperatures.

Since the oxide particles are incoherent, dislocations can only overcome the particles by climb. If instead the particles are semi-coherent or coherent with the lattice, then dislocations can simply cut the particles by a more favourable process that requires less energy called dislocation glide or by Orowan bowing between particles, both of which are athermal mechanisms. Dislocation climb is a diffusional process, which is less energetically favourable and mostly occurs at higher temperatures that provide enough energy to advance via the addition and removal of atoms. Because the particles are incoherent, glide mechanisms alone are not enough and the more energetically exhausting climb process is dominant, meaning that dislocations are stopped more effectively. Climb can occur either at the particle-dislocation interface (local climb) or by overcoming multiple particles at once (general climb). In local climb, the part of the dislocation that is between two particles stays in the glide plane while the rest of the dislocation is climbing along the surface of the particle. For general climb, the dislocations all come out the glide plane. General climb requires less energy because the mechanism decreases the dislocation line length which reduces the elastic strain energy and therefore is the common climb mechanism. For γ’ volume fractions of 0.4 to 0.6 in nickel-based alloys, the threshold stress for local climb is only about 1.25 to 1.40 times higher than general climb.

Dislocations are not limited to either all-local or all-general climb as the path that requires less energy is taken. Cooperative climb is an example of a more nuanced mechanism where a dislocation travels around a group of particles rather than climbing past each particle individually. McLean stated that the dislocation is most relaxed when climbing over multiple particles because of the skipping of some of the abrupt interfaces between segments in the glide plane to segments that travel along the particle surface.

The presence of incoherent particles introduces a threshold stress (σ_{t}), since an additional stress will have to be applied for the dislocations to move past the oxides by climb. After overcoming a particle by climb, dislocations can remain pinned at the particle-matrix interface with an attractive phenomenon called interfacial pinning, which requires additional threshold stress to free a dislocation out of this pinning, which must be overcome for plastic deformation to occur. This detachment phenomenon is a result of the interaction between the particle and the dislocation where total elastic strain energy is reduced. Schroder and Arzt explain that the additional stress required is due to the relaxation caused by the reduction in the stress field as the dislocation climbs and accommodates the shear traction. The following equations represent the strain rate and stress as a result of oxide introduction.

Strain Rate:

$\overset{.}{\epsilon}=A'(\frac{\sigma-\sigma_t}{\mu})^n$

Threshold Shear Stress:

$\tau_{th}=\frac{\alpha}{2}\frac{Gb}{l}$

== Synthesis ==
=== Ball-milling ===
ODS steels' creep properties are dependent on the characteristics of the oxide particles in the metal matrix, specifically their ability to prevent dislocation motion as well as the size and distribution of the particles. Hoelzer and coworkers showed that an alloy containing a homogeneous dispersion of 1–5 nm Y_{2}Ti_{2}O_{7} nanoclusters has superior creep properties to an alloy with a heterogeneous dispersion of 5–20 nm nanoclusters of the same composition.

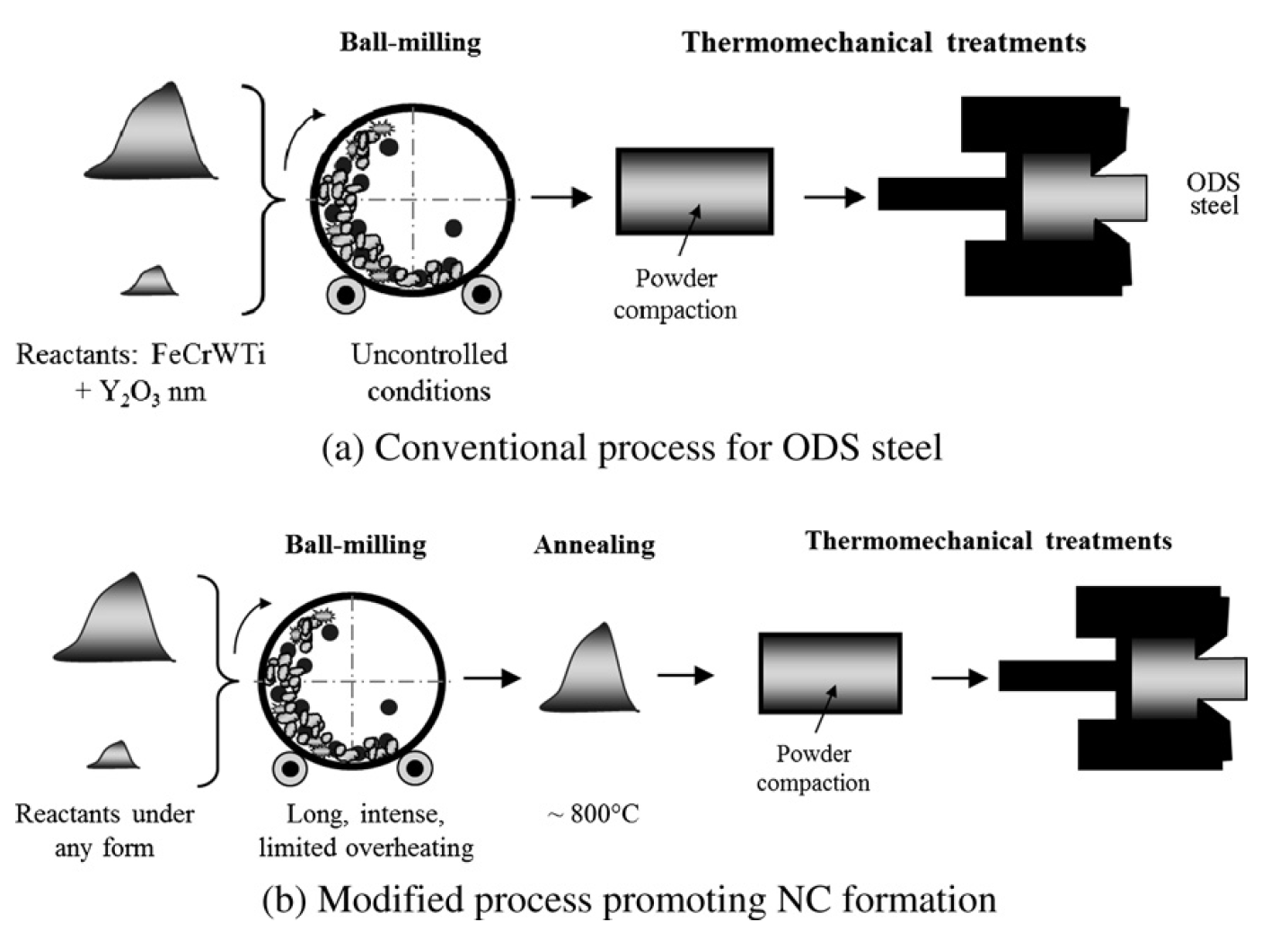
Simplified scheme of conventional process of ODS steel (a) and the modified process promoting nano-oxide formation

ODS steels are commonly produced through ball-milling an oxide of interest (e.g. Y_{2}O_{3}, Al_{2}O_{3}) with pre-alloyed metal powders followed by compression and sintering. It is believed that the oxides enter into solid solution with the metal during ball-milling and subsequently precipitate during the thermal treatment. This process seems simple, but many parameters need to be carefully controlled to produce a successful alloy. Leseigneur and coworkers carefully controlled some of these parameters and achieved more consistent and better microstructures. In this two-step method, the oxide is ball-milled for longer periods to ensure a homogeneous solid solution of the oxide. The powder is annealed at higher temperatures to begin a controlled nucleation of the oxide clusters. Finally, the powder is again compressed and sintered to yield the final material.

== NASA ==
NASA used resonant acoustic mixing and additive manufacturing to synthesize an alloy they termed GRX-810, which survived temperatures over 1,090 °C (1,990 °F). The alloy also featured improved strength, malleability, and durability. The printer dispersed oxide particles uniformly throughout the metal matrix. The alloy was identified using 30 simulations of thermodynamic modeling.

== See also ==
- Glidcop
- Superalloy
