= Sara Mazur =

Swedish physicist and electrical engineer

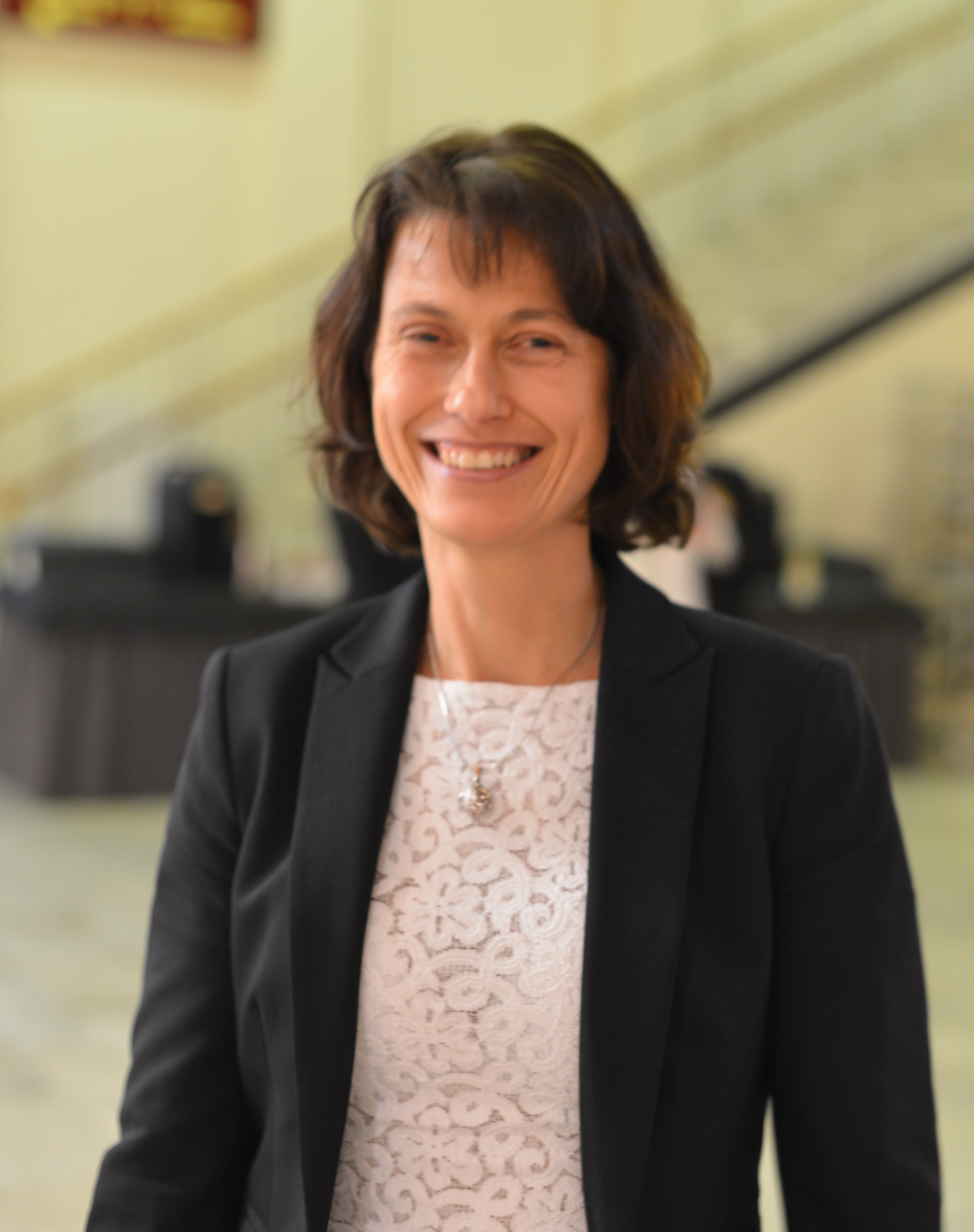
Sara Mazur in 2014

Birgit Sara Mazur (born 8 May 1966), is a Swedish physicist, electrical engineer, and business executive.

Sara Mazur grew up in Stockholm and attended the Royal Institute of Technology, graduating with degrees in 1989 and 1994 in plasma physics. She has worked at Ericsson since 1995. She became vice president and Head of Research in November 2012.

Mazur was elected 2007 as a member of the Royal Swedish Academy of Engineering Sciences. In 2015 she received an honorary doctorate at Luleå University of Technology.

Since 2020, Sara Mazur is the chair of the largest research program in Sweden, the Wallenberg AI, Autonomous Systems and Software Program
