= Glidcop =

Glidcop is a family of oxide dispersion-strengthened alloys composed of copper and with a small amount of aluminum oxide particles. It is a trademark of North American Höganäs. The name is sometimes written GlidCop or GLIDCOP.

The aluminum oxide particles block dislocation creep, which retards recrystallization and prevents grain growth; thus preserving the metal's strength at high temperatures. They also protect the metal against radiation damage. On the other hand, they exclude the possibly of heat treatment or hot working of the worked parts.

== Properties ==
=== Composition and physical properties ===
Glidcop is available in several grades which have varying amounts of aluminum oxide content.

Composition and physical properties of various grades of Glidcop compared to oxygen-free copper (OFC) (at room temperature unless otherwise noted).
| Grade | Aluminum oxide content | UNS alloy number | Melting point | Density | Electrical conductivity | Thermal conductivity | Coefficient of thermal expansion (range 20–150 °C (68–302 °F) | Modulus of elasticity |
|---|---|---|---|---|---|---|---|---|
| OFC | 0% | - | 1,083 °C (1,981 °F) | 8.94 g/cm^{3} (0.323 lb/in^{3}) | 58 MS/m (101% IACS) | 391 W/m·K (226 BTU/ft·hr·°F) | 17.7 μm/m·K (9.8 μ-in/in·°F) | 115 GPa (17 Mpsi) |
| Glidcop AL-15 | 0.3 wt. % | UNS-C15715 | 1,083 °C (1,981 °F) | 8.90 g/cm^{3} (0.321 lb/in^{3}) | 54 MS/m (92% IACS) | 365 W/m·K (211 BTU/ft·hr·°F) | 16.6 μm/m·K (9.2 μ-in/in·°F) | 130 GPa (19 Mpsi) |
| Glidcop AL-25 | 0.5 wt. % | UNS-C15725 | 1,083 °C (1,981 °F) | 8.86 g/cm^{3} (0.320 lb/in^{3}) | 50 MS/m (87% IACS) | 344 W/m·K (199 BTU/ft·hr·°F) | 16.6 μm/m·K (9.2 μ-in/in·°F) | 130 GPa (19 Mpsi) |
| Glidcop AL-60 | 1.1 wt. % | UNS-C15760 | 1,083 °C (1,981 °F) | 8.81 g/cm^{3} (0.318 lb/in^{3}) | 45 MS/m (78% IACS) | 322 W/m·K (186 BTU/ft·hr·°F) | 16.6 μm/m·K (9.2 μ-in/in·°F) | 130 GPa (19 Mpsi) |

Additional materials and elements can be added if lower thermal expansion is required, or higher room temperature and elevated temperature strengths. The hardness can also be increased. A composite material of Glidcop AL-60 and 10% Niobium provides high strength and high conductivity. The hardness is comparable to many copper-beryllium and copper-tungsten alloys, while the electrical conductivity is comparable to RWMA Class 2 alloy. Other additives for specialized applications include molybdenum, tungsten, Kovar, and Alloy 42.

At 500 °C (932 °F), Glidcop AL-15 has a yield strength of over 29 ksi (200 MPa).

=== Post-neutron-irradiation properties ===
Glidcop is resistant to degradation by neutron irradiation. Samples irradiated by neutrons at 411 °C (772 °F) and cooled to room temperature were found to have greater tensile strength and electrical conductivity and less swelling than samples of pure copper under the same treatment. For radiation levels of 0 to 150 dpa (displacements per atom), the tensile strength was nearly constant and swelling not noticeable, while pure copper experienced a linear decrease in tensile strength and 30% swelling between 0 and 50 dpa. While both pure copper and Glidcop experienced linear drops of electrical conductivity, the drop for Gildcop was smaller.

=== Workability ===
The machinability and cold working properties of Glidcop are similar to those of pure copper. Brazing with silver-based brazing alloys may require first electroplating the Glidcop part with either copper or nickel. The copper plating can be done with a copper cyanide solution; other solutions may not work. Gold-based brazing alloys like 3565 AuCu and 5050 AuCu, can be used in a dry hydrogen atmosphere.

Cold working Gildcop by drawing, cold heading etc. increases its strength through work hardening while reducing ductility.

== Applications ==
Glidcop uses include resistance welding electrodes to prevent them from sticking to galvanized and other coated steels. It has also been used in applications where its resistance to softening at high temperatures is necessary, including incandescent light bulb, leads relay blades, contactor supports, x-ray tube components, heat exchanger sections for fusion power and synchrotron units, high field magnetic coils, sliding electrical contacts, arc welder electrodes, electronic leadframes, MIG contact tips, commutators, high speed motor and generator components, and microwave power tube components.

Glidcop has also been used in hybrid circuit packages due to its compatibility with high temperature brazing, and in particle accelerator components, such as radio frequency quadrupoles and compact X-ray absorbers for undulator beam lines, where the alloy may be subjected to high temperatures and high radiation simultaneously.

== See also ==
- Precipitation hardening
