= Dental cermet =

Restorative material in dentistry

Dental cermets, or silver cermets, are a type of restorative material dentists use to fill tooth cavities.

Silver cermets were created to improve the wear resistance and hardness of another type of filling material, glass ionomer cements, through the addition of silver. While the incorporation of silver achieved this, cermets have poorer aesthetics, appearing metallic rather than white. Cermets also have a similar compressive strength, flexural strength, and solubility as glass ionomer cements, some of the main limiting factors for both materials. Therefore, silver cermets are not a popular choice of restorative material.

== Composition ==
Silver cermets can come in two forms:

- Two bottles, one containing a powder and the other containing a liquid. The powder and liquid must be measured out individually and mixed together by hand.
- A capsule in which the cermet components have already been proportioned correctly. The capsule is shaken in an amalgamator to mix the components.

The powder contains silver and fluoroaluminosilicate glass particles; the silver and glass particles may be fused together or separate. Other components in the powder include titanium oxide which acts as a whitening agent to improve aesthetics.

The liquid is an aqueous solution of a co-polymer of either 37% acrylic or maleic acid, or both, and 9% tartaric acid.

When the liquid and powder are mixed, an acid-base reaction occurs, initiating setting of the cermet.

== Properties ==
=== Fluoride release ===
Like glass ionomer cements and dental compomers, silver cermets are able to release fluoride over a sustained period of time. However, the evidence suggests the fluoride releasing abilities of cermets are poorer than glass ionomer cements.

=== Adhesion ===
Cermets are able to bond to tooth tissue similar to glass ionomer cements. Like glass ionomer cements, it is recommended that the tooth tissue is conditioned with polyacrylic acid (a weak acid) before application.

=== Wear resistance ===
There is evidence that cermets have poor wear resistance when used to restore a large surface area. Therefore, it is advisable to limit their use to small restorations, particularly Class I cavities (see Green Vardiman Black Classification section on the Wiki page for Dental Restoration).

=== Radiopacity ===
The added silver imparts radio-opacity to cermets which aids radiographic detection of recurrent caries at a future date.

== Clinical application ==
Silver cermets have performed poorly in clinical practice despite their theorised advantages over glass ionomer cements. As such, they are no longer a popular choice of material and it is unclear whether cermets will continue to be used.

== Summary ==
Table summarising advantages and disadvantages of silver cermets
Advantages	Disadvantages
Radio-opaque	Low compressive strength
Adheres directly to tooth tissue	Low flexural strength
Higher wear resistance than glass ionomer cements (GICs)	Soluble
Greater hardness than GICs	Poor aesthetics
	Poorer fluoride release than GICs
	Poor clinical performance
