= Knut and Alice Wallenberg Foundation =

Swedish research foundation

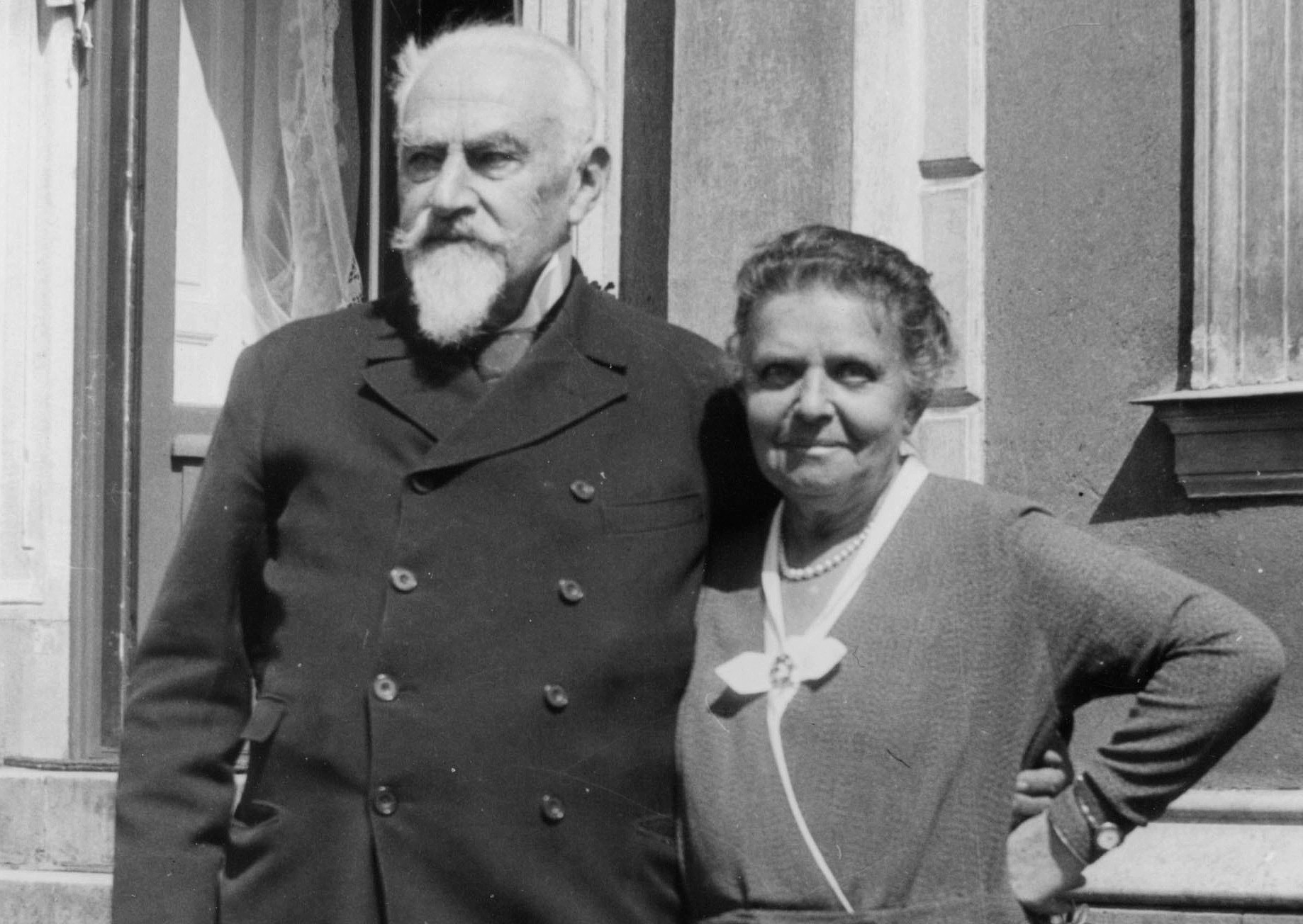
- Founded: 1917
- Founder: Knut and Alice Wallenberg
- Purpose: Grants to scientific research and education at Swedish universities, institutes and other academic units
- Location: Stockholm, Sweden
- Method: Grants
- Endowment: SEK m 39,035 (2012)
- Website: kaw.wallenberg.org

Knut and Alice Wallenberg Foundation (KAW) (Swedish: Knut och Alice Wallenbergs Stiftelse) is a Swedish public and private foundation formed in 1917 by Knut Agathon Wallenberg and his wife Alice Wallenberg. It was created to support research in the natural sciences, technology and medicine by awarding long-term grants to basic research of the highest international class.

== Governance ==
From its start in 1917 to 1971 the board members of the Foundation were mostly from the Wallenberg family. In 1971 a Council of Principals was established which changed the membership pattern, and the academics began to serve as board members of the KAW. Then politicians from the Centre Party were also assigned to the board, including Christina Rogestam, Anders Dahlgren, and Thorbjörn Fälldin.

In 2026, Magnus Berggren became executive director taking over for Sara Mazur.

== Funding ==
Since its establishment it has approved funding of just over SEK 27.2 billion to Swedish research and education. Almost SEK 14.5 billion of this was awarded between 2008 and 2018. The funding allocated annually in recent years of almost SEK 2 billion has given the Foundation its position as one of the largest private research foundations in Europe. Knut and Alice Wallenberg Foundation is the largest of the 16 foundations formed on the basis of donations from members of the Wallenberg family, or created with funds raised in honor of Wallenberg family members. The foundations are referred to collectively as the Wallenberg Foundations, and award grants totaling approximately SEK 2.2 billion each year.

In 1999, Stanford University received a $15 million grant from the KAW and the Marianne and Marcus Wallenberg Foundation to create the Wallenberg Global Learning Center. The KAW provided the Wallenberg Initiative Materials Science for Sustainability (WISE) with about SEK 3 billion in funding for the 2022-2023 period.

In October 2024, the KAW awarded 30 basic research projects in the fields of medicine, natural sciences and technology with SEK 835 million. Since 2011, a total of SEK 8.3 billion in grants has been provided to 303 projects of this type.

== See also ==
- Foundation Asset Management AB (FAM)
- Skandinaviska Enskilda Banken (SEB)
- Wallenberg family
- Wallenberg AI, Autonomous Systems and Software Program
