= Wallenberg AI, Autonomous Systems and Software Program =

Swedish research program

Wallenberg AI, Autonomous Systems and Software Program (WASP), launched in 2015, is Sweden’s largest individual research program.

The total funding is 6,2 billion SEK, whereof 4,9 billion SEK is donated by Knut and Alice Wallenberg Foundation.

Since January 2020, Sara Mazur is the chair of the program, and program director is Anders Ynnerman.

== Research ==
The aim of the program is academic basic research in artificial intelligence, autonomous systems, and software. The goal is recruitment of 80 leading researchers and examination of 600 PhD students

== Collaboration partners ==
WASP has five partner universities: Chalmers University of Technology, Linköping University, Lund University, KTH Royal Institute of Technology, and Umeå University. In addition, there are affiliated research groups at Örebro University, Uppsala University and Luleå University of Technology that are also included.

Collaboration with Swedish industry is crucial, and, at present (January 2023) 60 companies are engaged in the program.
