= Wasp (1776 ship) =

British slave ship

Wasp was a British slave ship built in 1776 in British America. Operating out of Bristol, she completed 11 slave voyages.
