= Frank Duckworth =

English statistician (1939–2024)

Frank Duckworth MBE
- Born: 26 December 1939; Lytham St Annes, Lancashire, England
- Died: 21 June 2024 (aged 84)
- Occupation: Statistician
- Known for: Duckworth–Lewis method, Risk perception

Frank Carter Duckworth MBE (26 December 1939 – 21 June 2024) was an English statistician who co-developed the Duckworth–Lewis method of resetting targets in limited overs cricket matches interrupted by weather or other circumstances.

== Early life and education ==
Duckworth was born on 26 December 1939 in Lytham St Annes, Lancashire. He attended King Edward VII School, Lytham, now part of King Edward VII and Queen Mary School, then went on to study physics (BSc Hons 1961) and earned a PhD (1965) in metallurgy, both at the University of Liverpool.

== Career ==
Prior to his retirement, he worked as a mathematical scientist for the English nuclear power industry. He was a consultant statistician to the International Cricket Council, and the editor of the Royal Statistical Society's monthly news magazine, RSS News, until he retired from both these roles in 2014. He also served on the editorial board of Significance before stepping down in 2010. In 2004 he delivered the Royal Statistical Society Schools Lecture, entitled Lies and Statistics.

In 1962, Duckworth was a tenant of John Lennon's aunt.

Duckworth is also known for developing a system of quantifying personal risk perception, now known as the "Duckworth scale".

== Death ==
Duckworth died of cancer on 21 June 2024, at the age of 84.

== Awards and recognition ==
Duckworth was appointed Member of the Order of the British Empire (MBE) in the 2010 Birthday Honours for services to the Royal Statistical Society and to Cricket. He was also the recipient of the Degree of Doctor of Science, honoris causa. from the University of Bath in 2015.
