= Wallenberg Foundations =

Foundation collective formed by donations from the Wallenberg family

The Wallenberg Foundations refers collectively to the 16 public and private foundations formed on the basis of donations from members of the Swedish Wallenberg family, or created with funds raised in honor of Wallenberg family members.

The Foundations award grants to excellent researchers and research projects whose purpose is for the benefit of Sweden. Over the past ten years the Foundations have awarded funding of just over SEK 17 billion. Total funding since the Foundations were established is approaching SEK 33 billion. The three largest foundations awarded SEK 2.2 billion in 2018. The emphasis of funding is on medicine, technology and natural sciences, but the Foundations also support social sciences, the humanities and archaeology.

== Structure ==
Sixteen individual foundations form the basis for what is collectively called the Wallenberg Foundations. The three largest Foundations – Knut and Alice Wallenberg Foundation, Marianne and Marcus Wallenberg Foundation, and Marcus and Amalia Wallenberg Foundation jointly own FAM AB, an unlisted company whose purpose is to own and manage its direct holdings, and function as an active owner with a long-term commitment. The three foundations also have substantial holdings in the listed company Investor AB which holds positions in international companies, most of them with Swedish roots.

The Wallenberg Foundations collectively hold 50% of shares in Investor AB and 100% of shares in FAM AB. They also controlled 7.5% of Swedish national carrier SAS, however, their involvement in the flag carrier ended as part of the airline's restructuring after COVID-19.

Active engagement in these companies forms the bulk of the Wallenberg family's activities with most assets held through foundations tightly controlled by the family who invest the assets in family-run operating companies. The family's assets generate approximately $160 billion in annual revenue. Dividends from the holdings are used to fund research and education grants in line with the Wallenberg's stated goal of working for the benefit of Sweden or "landsgagneliga".

The foundations combined award funding of just over SEK 2.2 billion each year for Swedish research and education. The foundations are Sweden's largest private funder of research and also holds the title at a number of universities including Uppsala University and Karolinska Institutet. The Knut and Alice Wallenberg Foundation is itself the second-largest backer of basic scientific research in Europe, distributing $2.7 billion (SEK 24 billion) in its first 100 years of existence as of 2017.

== Human Protein Atlas ==
The Wallenberg Foundations funded the Human Protein Atlas in 2003 at a cost of SEK 900 million which had, as of 2013, mapped 15,000 proteins largely through the Knut and Alice Wallenberg Foundation. The project involves hundreds of scientists including from Karolinska Institute, Stockholm University, Uppsala University and the Swedish Royal Institute of Technology forming the Science for Life Laboratory (SciLifeLab). The foundations provide SEK 120 million annually to support the SciLifeLab.

== Wallenberg Scholars ==
In 2009, the foundations began the Wallenberg Scholars program to fund Sweden's leading senior researchers with 5-year grants that can be used for research without restrictions. The program was started because "researchers need long-term funding without the distraction of pressure to secure external grants in order to carry out world-class research" according to the foundations. There were 118 Wallenberg Scholars as of 2024.
