= Wallenberg =

Wallenberg is a Swedish surname which may refer to:

== People ==
- Adolf Wallenberg (1862–1949), German internist and neurologist
- André Oscar Wallenberg (1816–1886), Swedish banker, industrialist, newspaper tycoon, father of Knuth Agathon, Marcus Sr., Gustaf, Victor
- Gustaf Wally (born Wallenberg, 1905–1966), Swedish dancer, actor and theatre manager
- Gustaf Wallenberg (1863–1937), Swedish diplomat
- Jacob Wallenberg (1892–1980) Swedish banker and industrialist, son of Marcus Sr.
- Jacob Wallenberg (born 1956), Swedish banker and industrialist, son of Peter Sr.
- Knut Agathon Wallenberg (1853–1938), Swedish banker and politician, half-brother of Marcus Sr.
- Marc Wallenberg (1924–1971), Swedish banker and industrialist, son of Marcus Jr.
- Marcus Wallenberg (bishop) (1774–1833), Swedish theologian and bishop, father of André Oscar
- Marcus Wallenberg Sr. (1864–1943), Swedish banker and industrialist, father of Jacob and Marcus Jr.
- Marcus Wallenberg Jr. (1899–1982), Swedish banker and industrialist, son of Marcus Sr., father of Peter Sr.
- Marcus Wallenberg (born 1956), Swedish banker and industrialist, son of Marc
- Peter Wallenberg Sr. (1926–2015), Swedish industrialist, son of Marcus Jr.
- Peter Wallenberg Jr. (born 1959), Swedish businessman, son of Peter Sr.
- Raoul Wallenberg (1912–1947?), Swedish diplomat acclaimed for his role in saving a great number of Jews in the Holocaust
- Victor Wallenberg (1875–1970), Swedish sports shooter, brother of Marcus Sr.
- Wallenberg family, prominent Swedish family, renowned as bankers, industrialists, politicians, diplomats and philanthropists

== Other ==
- Wallenberg Medal, University of Michigan award and endowment
- Wallenberg expressway, Highway in Rockford, Illinois, named after Raoul
- Raoul Wallenberg Traditional High School, in San Francisco, California
- Knut and Alice Wallenberg Foundation, Swedish private foundation
- Wallenberg's Syndrome, also known as Lateral medullary syndrome
- Raoul-Wallenberg-Straße station, railway station in the Marzahn-Hellersdorf district of Berlin
- Raoul Wallenberg Committee of the United States, organization based in the United States
- Raoul Wallenberg Award, bestowed by the Raoul Wallenberg Committee of the United States
- Marcus Wallenberg-hallen, vehicle museum in Södertälje, in the Swedish province of Sörmland
- Wallenberg Set, popular spot for skateboarders at the Raoul Wallenberg Traditional High School
- Wallenberg (opera), 2001 opera by Erkki-Sven Tüür about events in Raoul Wallenberg's life
- Wallenbergare, a Swedish dish named after the family
