= Gustaf Wallenberg (diplomat) =

Swedish diplomat (1863–1937)

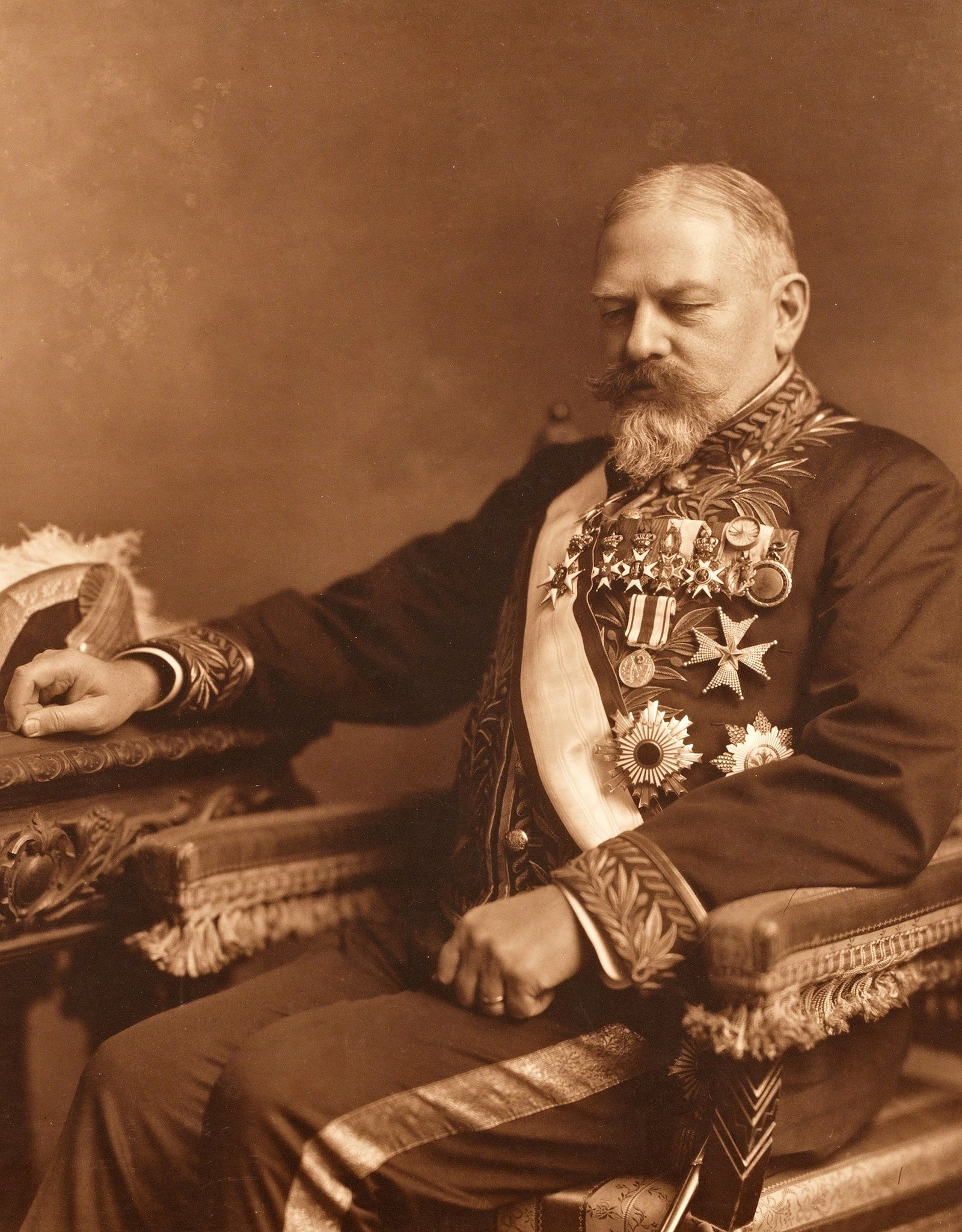

Envoy of Sweden to the Ottoman Empire/Turkey
- In office 1921–1930
- Preceded by: Cossva Anckarsvärd
- Succeeded by: Johannes Kolmodin

Envoy of Sweden to Bulgaria
- In office 1921–1930
- Preceded by: Cossva Anckarsvärd
- Succeeded by: Carl von Heidenstam

Envoy of Sweden to Japan
- In office 1906–1920
- Preceded by: Arthur M.D. Swerts de Landas Wyborgh
- Succeeded by: David Bergström

Envoy of Sweden to China
- In office 1907–1920
- Preceded by: None
- Succeeded by: David Bergström

Member of Parliament Andra kammaren
- In office 1900–1906
- Constituency: City of Stockholm's First Constituency

Personal details
- Born: Gustaf Oscar Wallenberg; 6 January 1863 Stockholm, Sweden
- Died: 21 March 1937 (aged 74) Stockholm, Sweden
- Party: Liberal Coalition Party (1902–1906)
- Spouse: Annie Adelsköld (m. 1887)
- Children: 3, including Nita Wallenberg
- Parent: André Oscar Wallenberg (father)
- Relatives: Marcus (brother); Victor (brother); Knut Agathon (half-brother); Raoul (grandson); Claes Adelsköld (father-in-law)
- Occupation: Diplomat, naval officer, shipowner

Military service
- Allegiance: Sweden
- Branch/service: Swedish Navy
- Years of service: 1882–1888
- Rank: Commander (reserve)

Gustaf Oscar Wallenberg (6 January 1863 – 21 March 1937) was a Swedish diplomat, naval officer and shipowner. Wallenberg was born in 1863 in Stockholm, the son of prominent banker André Oscar Wallenberg. He came from a large and influential family, with thirteen full siblings and several half-siblings, many of whom held important positions in Swedish society. Like others in his family, Wallenberg began his career in the navy but soon transitioned to business, where he made lasting contributions to Sweden's transportation sector. He became a shipowner, served on the board of Stockholms Enskilda Bank, and helped found the Stockholm–Saltsjön Railway Company and a shipping line connecting Sweden to continental Europe.

Wallenberg also played a major role in shaping national trade policy, participating in numerous government committees and serving in parliament from 1900 to 1906. In 1906, he was appointed envoy to Japan and later accredited to China, becoming a key figure in Sweden's diplomatic and economic expansion into East Asia. He promoted a more commercially focused foreign service and collaborated closely with major Swedish banks and industries. However, his tenure was marred by allegations of misconduct and favoritism, prompting an internal investigation. While the accusations were not formally upheld, they revealed tensions between state diplomacy and business interests.

In 1920, Wallenberg was appointed envoy to Constantinople. In Turkey, he worked to expand Sweden's trade relations and developed strong ties with Turkish leadership, taking particular interest in the country's modernization efforts. He retired in 1930 but chose to remain in Turkey, reflecting his deep connection to the region. Wallenberg's career illustrates the growing influence of industry in Swedish diplomacy and the country's evolving role in global trade during the early 20th century.

== Early life ==
Wallenberg was born on 6 January 1863 in Stockholm, Sweden, the son of bank director André Oscar Wallenberg and his wife Anna von Sydow. He had thirteen full siblings, including brothers Marcus (1864–1943), Oscar (1872–1939), Axel (1874–1963), and Victor (1875–1970), as well as four half-siblings, among them half-brother Knut Agathon (1853–1938).

== Career ==
=== Military career ===
Like many other members of his family, Wallenberg initially pursued a career at sea. He was commissioned as an acting sub-lieutenant in the Swedish Navy and joined the merchant fleet in 1884. From 1885 to 1886, he served as an adjutant in the Military Office of the Ministry for Naval Affairs. Promoted to sub-lieutenant in 1887, he was honorably discharged in 1888 with the right to retain seniority and promotion eligibility. In 1891, he left active service with the recommendation to remain in the Naval Reserve as a sub-lieutenant. He was promoted to lieutenant in the reserve in 1892 and to commander in 1906.

=== Business career ===
In 1891, Wallenberg left active military service to devote himself to business. He took particular interest in transportation issues and improving Sweden's maritime connections. He became a shipowner in Stockholm in 1886 and was also involved in the emerging Swedish separator industry. In 1888, he joined the board of Stockholms Enskilda Bank, where he remained until 1902. From 1892 to 1896, he was the first managing director of the newly founded Stockholm–Saltsjön Railway Company, where he oversaw the development of the Saltsjöbaden community. In 1896, together with O. Lagerberg and A. Ribbing, he founded Rederi AB Sverige–Kontinenten, which began regular postal boat service between Trelleborg and Sassnitz the following year. He served as the company's first managing director until early 1907.

Wallenberg also held a number of public positions during his business career. He was a member of the 1898 Trade and Shipping Committee (handels- och sjöfartskommittén), where he worked to strengthen the shipping industry and promote direct connections between Sweden and major transoceanic countries. Thanks in large part to his efforts, Sweden established an East Asian steamship line in 1907. From 1900 to 1906, he was a member of the Second Chamber of Parliament (liberal), representing the City of Stockholm, where he continued to advocate for maritime affairs. He also served as chairman of the board of Sweden's General Shipping Association (Sveriges allmänna sjöfartsförening). In addition, he participated in several government committees, including the committee on new regulations for merchant ship officers and navigation schools (1897–1898), the Trade and Shipping Committee (1898), the committee on revisions to the Navy's pension system (1900–1904), the committee on ship measurement regulations (from 1902), and the committee on the reorganization of the National Railway Administration (Järnvägsstyrelsen) (1906).

=== Diplomatic career ===
Before becoming a diplomat, Wallenberg had been a strong advocate for the importance of engaging Swedish industry in exports to the untapped markets of the Far East. Following the dissolution of the union (with Norway), when Sweden's diplomatic service was being reorganized, Wallenberg was called upon for this work and was appointed envoy to Tokyo in 1906 (and accredited to Beijing in 1907). Wallenberg was a key figure in Sweden's diplomatic and economic expansion into East Asia during the late 19th and early 20th centuries. Serving as Swedish minister and consul general in Japan and China after the dissolution of the union with Norway in 1905, Wallenberg operated during a period when Sweden began to reorient its foreign service toward commercial goals. He embodied the new type of diplomat envisioned by reformers—a representative with strong political credentials and deep ties to Swedish industry.

Wallenberg worked closely with major Swedish business interests, particularly Stockholms Handelsbank, and advocated for a more commercially focused foreign service. Under his leadership, the Swedish legation in China added specialized commercial positions based on consultations with Swedish companies. He viewed international diplomacy through the lens of economic opportunity and adopted a pragmatic stance toward imperialism, believing that engaging with the dominant strategies of the time—such as the U.S.-inspired "dollar diplomacy"—was necessary for Sweden to compete. Despite these efforts, Wallenberg's tenure was marred by controversy. Several high-ranking subordinates and respected Swedish businessmen in Japan accused him of misconduct, misuse of state funds, and undermining Swedish trade. Notably, entrepreneurs like Knut Gadelius and Lennart Brusewitz claimed he damaged Swedish commercial interests by favoring foreign competitors and sowing division among Swedish firms.

An internal investigation was launched, and although Foreign Minister Arvid Taube acknowledged that Wallenberg had behaved inappropriately toward colleagues and businessmen, he ultimately dismissed the accusations as gossip and retained Wallenberg in his position. This decision was influenced both by Wallenberg's powerful family background—he belonged to Sweden's most prominent business dynasty—and by his respected status in Japan. Wallenberg's case illustrates a broader tension in Swedish foreign policy at the time: the divide between state diplomacy and industrial ambitions. While he pushed for greater Swedish engagement in China and Japan, other regions like India and Southeast Asia were deprioritized. His legacy is emblematic of Sweden's shift from traditional diplomacy toward a more trade-oriented international presence during the early 20th century.

Wallenberg's return journey from Tokyo in early 1918 attracted considerable attention. Due to the uncertain conditions caused by the Russian Civil War, and particularly the Russian Revolution, Wallenberg was detained in Siberia for an extended period. He was eventually forced to return to Japan and travel home via North America, only arriving in Sweden in February 1919. In 1920, he was appointed envoy to Constantinople, with concurrent accreditation in Sofia.

In this post as well (in Turkey), Wallenberg worked to expand Sweden's trade relations. His efforts were supported by the fact that he was highly regarded within Turkish government circles. In turn, Wallenberg showed a keen interest in the development efforts of the new Turkish state, particularly İsmet İnönü's railway program. When he retired from his position in 1930, he chose to remain in Turkey.

== Personal life ==
In 1887, Wallenberg married Annie Adelsköld (born 1869), the daughter of Major Claes Adelsköld and Gustafva Brolin. They had three children: Raoul Oscar Wallenberg (1888–1912; father of Raoul Wallenberg), Karin Wallenberg (1891–1979), and Nita Wallenberg (1896–1966).

== Death and funeral ==
=== Death ===
Wallenberg, who had been residing in Turkey, died on 21 March 1937, during a brief visit to Stockholm. The official Turkish newspaper Ulus, along with other outlets, prominently featured portraits and biographical tributes to Wallenberg, with articles emphasizing his deep and enduring friendship with Turkey.

=== Funeral ===
Wallenberg's remains were laid to rest on Maundy Thursday, 25 March, at Skeppsholmen Church. At the foot of the catafalque rested the Swedish flag that Wallenberg had received as a gift upon assuming his first diplomatic post abroad. The ceremony began with Chopin's funeral march, performed by the Royal Swedish Navy Band of Stockholm (Flottans musikkår). The burial service was conducted by Dr. Gustaf Adolf Brandt, vicar of Skeppsholm Parish, who offered a brief reflection and words of remembrance. This was followed by a performance of "Landkjending" by Edvard Grieg, after which the coffin was borne from the church to the tolling of bells, carried by members of the naval corps. Led by the Navy Band, the funeral procession departed the church grounds and passed the Royal Guard, who presented arms in honor of the former naval officer. The coffin was then taken to the Wallenberg family grave at Malmvik in Ekerö Municipality, where Dr. Brandt offered a final prayer.

In accordance with Wallenberg's wishes, many mourners honored his memory by making donations to the Church of Sweden's Seamen's Welfare Board (Svenska kyrkans sjömansvårdsstyrelse), intended to support Swedish sailors in distress abroad. The Swedish Nobility Association's (Svenska adelsförbundet) floral and memorial fund also received contributions, including one from Djurgårdens IF. Additional gifts were made to the Association for the Widows and Orphans of Retired Officers (Föreningen Pensionerade officerares änke- och pupillfond).

Alongside family members, the funeral was attended by representatives from the regions where Wallenberg had served, as well as numerous personal friends. Among the mourners were the Turkish Minister, Japan's chargé d'affaires, Court Chamberlain Count Hans von Stedingk, State Secretary for Foreign Affairs Günther (representing the minister for foreign affairs), Admirals Lindsström, de Champs, Åkermark, and Ericson, Dr. Sven Hedin, State Secretary for Foreign Affairs af Ugglas, Envoys Hultgren, Danielsson, and David Bergström, Foreign Affairs Councilor Sahlin, Consuls General Sachs and Lilliehöök, Baron O. W. Ramel of the Foreign Ministry, and Commander Liedberg.

Condolences were received from the King, the Crown Prince and Princess, Prince Carl and Princess Ingeborg, as well as Prince Eugen.

Among the many floral tributes were wreaths from the Ministry for Foreign Affairs, the Naval Officers' Society in Stockholm (Sjöofficerssällskapet i Stockholm), the Swedish General Shipping Association (Sveriges allmänna sjöfartsförening), the General Export Association of Sweden, the Turkish Minister, the Japanese Legation, Sällskapet, Stockholms Enskilda Bank, the City of Trelleborg, the Seamen's Welfare Board (Svenska kyrkans sjömansvårdsstyrelse), the Marine Officers' Association of Stockholm (Maskinbefälsförening i Stockholm), the Danish Envoy in Ankara, Danish friends in Istanbul, the Swedish Minister in Constantinople, friends from the Swedish-Danish group, the Stockholm-Saltsjön Railway Company, Stockholms Rederi AB Svea, the Neptun Salvage and Diving Company, the Swedish East Asia Company, Nydqvist & Holm, Axel Broström & Son, Nordström & Thulin, and AB Gadelius & Co.

== Dates of rank ==
- 1882 – Acting sub-lieutenant
- 1887 – Sub-lieutenant
- 1891 – Sub-lieutenant (reserve)
- 1892 – Lieutenant (reserve)
- 1906 – Commander (reserve)

== Awards and decorations ==
=== Swedish ===
- (Sweden) King Gustaf V's Jubilee Commemorative Medal (1928)
- (Sweden) Commander Grand Cross of the Order of the Polar Star (6 June 1916)
- (Sweden) Commander 1st Class of the Order of the Polar Star (26 September 1907)
- (Sweden) Knight of the Order of the Polar Star (1897)
- (Sweden) Commander of the 2nd Class of the Order of Vasa (6 November 1905)
- (Sweden) Knight 1st Class of the Order of Vasa (1889)

=== Foreign ===
- (Belgium) Grand Cross of the Order of the Crown (between 1923 and 1925)
- (Tsardom of Bulgaria (1908–1946)) Grand Cross of the Order of Saint Alexander (between 1925 and 1928)
- (Tsardom of Bulgaria (1908–1946)) 1st Class of the Order of Saint Alexander (1922)
- (Denmark) Grand Cross of the Order of the Dannebrog (between 1925 and 1928)
- (Denmark) Commander 1st Class of the Order of the Dannebrog (1920)
- Grand Cross of the Order of the White Rose of Finland (between 1923 and 1925)
- (Empire of Japan) 1st Class of the Order of the Rising Sun (1912)
- (Beiyang government) 1st Class of the Order of the Precious Brilliant Golden Grain (1913)
- (Qing dynasty) 1st Class of the Order of the Double Dragon (1908)
- (Kingdom of Yugoslavia) Grand Cross of the Order of St. Sava (between 1925 and 1928)
- (Norway) Knight 1st Class of the Order of St. Olav (1901)
- (Spain) Knight of the Order of Charles III (before 1888)
- (France) Officier de l'Instruction Publique of the Ordre des Palmes académiques (1901)

Diplomatic posts
Preceded by Arthur M.D. Swerts de Landas Wyborgh	Envoy of Sweden to Japan; 1906–1920	Succeeded by David Bergström
Preceded by None	Envoy of Sweden to China; 1907–1920	Succeeded by David Bergström
Preceded by Cossva Anckarsvärd	Envoy of Sweden to the Ottoman Empire/Turkey; 1921–1930	Succeeded by Johannes Kolmodin
Preceded by Cossva Anckarsvärd	Envoy of Sweden to Bulgaria; 1921–1930	Succeeded by Carl von Heidenstam
