= Marcus Wallenberg =

Marcus Wallenberg may refer to:

- Marcus Wallenberg (bishop) (1774–1833), Swedish bishop
- Marcus Wallenberg Sr. (1864–1943), Swedish lawyer and banker
- Marcus Wallenberg Jr. (1899–1982), Swedish banker and athlete
- Marcus Wallenberg (born 1956), Swedish banker and industrialist
