= British Bank of Northern Commerce =

- Type: Private company
- Industry: Financial services
- Founded: February 1912
- Founders: Knut Agathon Wallenberg, Emil Glückstadt, Centralbanken for Norge, Azov-Don Commercial Bank, Banque de Paris et des Pays-Bas
- Defunct: 1920
- Fate: Merged
- Successor: Hambros Bank
- Headquarters: London, United Kingdom
- Area served: Finland
- Products: Investment banking, loans

The British Bank of Northern Commerce was a British investment bank set up to provide financing for Finland after the country achieved its independence from Russia in 1917-18. It operated from its founding in 1912 until it was merged with C.J Hambro & Sons in 1920.

== History ==
It was founded in February 1912 by Knut Agathon Wallenberg of the Stockholms Enskilda Bank and Emil Glückstadt of Landmandsbanken (Copenhagen), together with several other banks including Centralbanken for Norge (Christiania), Azov-Don Commercial Bank (Petrograd), and Banque de Paris et des Pays-Bas (Paris). The purpose of the bank was to facilitate trade between the United Kingdom and northern Europe.

In June 1919 the bank offered the chairmanship of its board to John Maynard Keynes with the assurance that in return for a salary of £2000 the job would only take a morning a week. Keynes had met Wallenberg and Glückstadt during World War I and the offer was attractive. However, Keynes consulted with several bankers in the City and turned the offer down.

In October 1920 British Bank of Northern Commerce merged with C.J. Hambro & Sons, with the combined bank taking the name Hambros Bank of Northern Commerce. In August 1921 the bank shortened its name to Hambros Bank, in part because it did not want a name that was too limiting.

== See also ==
- Banque des Pays du Nord
