= Nita Wallenberg =

Swedish artist

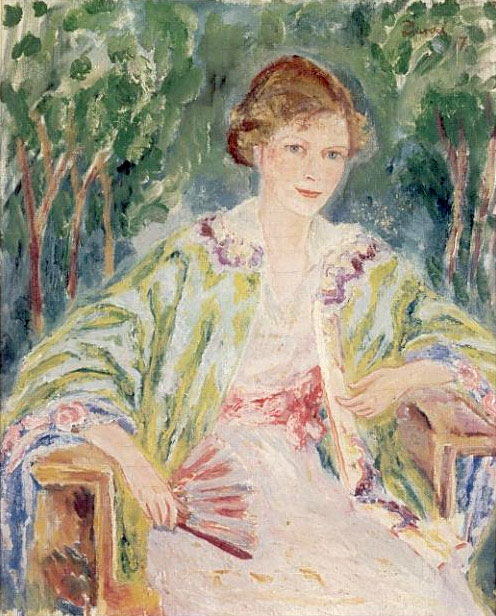
Nita Wallenberg in a 1917 portrait on canvas by Nils Dardel

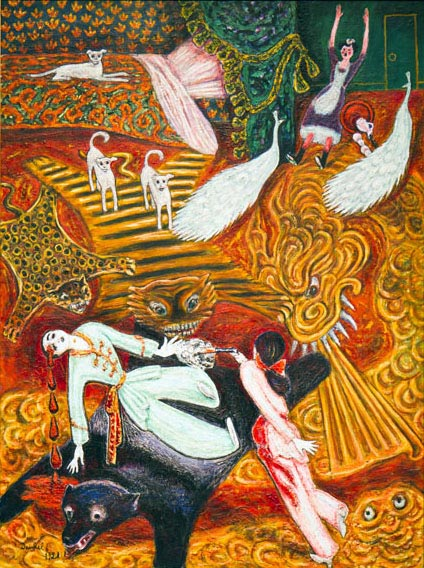
Crime Passionnel, 1921, Nils Dardel

Ebba Maria Sassnitza Wallenberg (11 April 1896 – 4 October 1966) was a Swedish artist.

== Biography ==
Wallenberg was known for her romance with Nils von Dardel and as the main motive of several pictures which Dardel painted during the period 1917–1920. Her third given name was inspired by the ferry-line Trelleborg-Sassnitz, of which her father, Gustaf Wallenberg, had been CEO in the 1890s. He later was the Swedish envoy to Japan; it was during one of those trips to Japan, in 1917, that his daughter met Dardel at the annual imperial cherry-blossom festival.

Wallenberg was engaged to Dardel in secret, but the engagement was annulled in 1919 by her family when they told Dardel that he did not meet the requirements to be married into the Wallenberg family. He was not considered useful to the Wallenberg company (indeed, the risk that Dardel would take advantage of being married into the family was considered very high), and rumours about his nightlife had reached Nita's father. The broken engagement heavily affected Dardel's painting and resulted in several pictures of womanly figures that resemble Nita.

"Nita" Wallenberg appears in some of Dardel's work, including Yngling i svart, Flicka i vitt from 1919, Vattenfallet from 1921, and Ynglingen och flickan from 1919. Two of his best-known paintings, Visit hos excentrisk dam and Crime Passionnel, have her as a quintessential point figure. In the oil painting Exekution, from 1919, Nita's father appears as a hardened executioner who kicks a young man over a steep hill.

Wallenberg was forced to burn all of Dardel's letters. She was given a place in the family banking business and told to forget her romance. Wallenberg afterward was married twice, to the Dane Carl Johan Kierullf and, later, from 1930 to 1944, to businessman Carl Axel Söderlund. She had three children.

== See also ==
- Wallenberg family
