= Marcus Wallenberg Sr =

Swedish banker (1864–1943)

Marcus Wallenberg Sr. RoKKMO
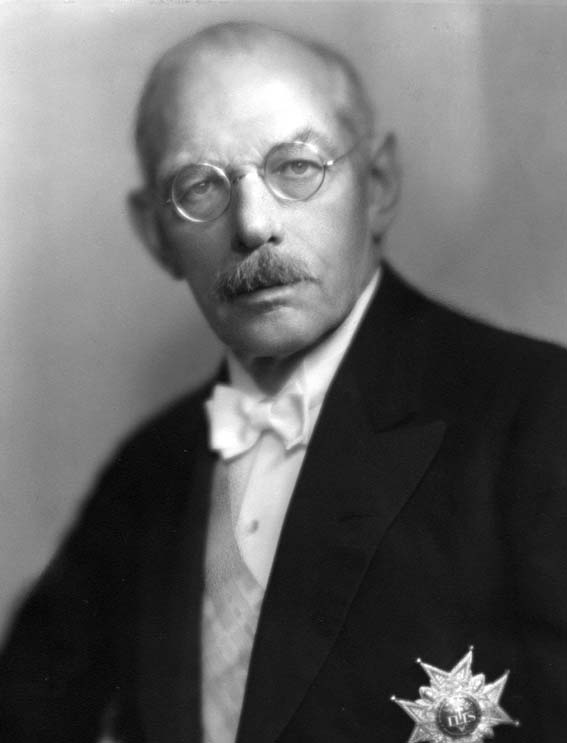
- Born: Marcus Laurentius Wallenberg; 5 March 1864; Stockholm, Sweden
- Died: 22 July 1943 (aged 79); Ekerö, Sweden
- Resting place: Wallenberg Mausoleum; 59°17′34″N 17°49′48″E
- Education: Uppsala University
- Occupations: Banker, industrialist
- Spouse: Amalia Wallenberg (m. 1890–1943)
- Children: 6, including Jacob and Marcus
- Parent(s): André Oscar Wallenberg; Anna von Sydow
- Relatives: Gustaf (brother); Victor (brother); Knut Agathon (half-brother)
- Family: Wallenberg family

Marcus Laurentius Wallenberg, Sr. RoKKMO (5 March 1864 – 22 July 1943) was a Swedish banker and industrialist. He was CEO of Stockholms Enskilda Bank (SEB) from 1911 to 1920.

== Early life ==
Wallenberg was born on 5 March 1864 in Stockholm, Sweden, the son of André Oscar Wallenberg and his second wife Anna von Sydow. He had thirteen full siblings, including brothers Gustaf (1863–1937), Oscar (1872–1939), Axel (1874–1963), and Victor (1875–1970), as well as four half-siblings, among them half-brother Knut Agathon (1853–1938).

Wallenberg became underlöjtnant in the Swedish Navy in 1882 but left his position the same year at the age of 18 and received a Candidate of Law degree from Uppsala University in 1888. He was appointed Master of Laws with court training in 1890.

== Career ==
=== SEB ===
In 1890, Wallenberg became ombudsman for Stockholms Enskilda Bank (SEB) and from 1892 belonged to the bank's executive board. In 1892, Marcus's older half brother, Knut Agaton Wallenberg, was CEO of Stockholms Enskilda Bank and induced Marcus to come work for him as vice president of the bank; an offer Marcus accepted. His older brother retired as CEO in the year of 1911 and Marcus replaced him as CEO. He was CEO until the year of 1920. Marcus laid the very foundation of the bank for decades with his emphatic defense of his own banking policy and constant emphasis on the importance of family traditions. He became vice chairman of the board of SEB in 1920 and then was its chairman from 1938 until his death in 1943.

=== Other businesses ===
Wallenberg participated in the founding of Centralbanken for Norge (1899) and AB Emissionsinstitutet (1914). In addition, Wallenberg had been so intrigued by the promotion of Swedish industry that his name became intimately connected with its development in the first quarter of the 20th century. During his initiative and participation, several of Sweden's largest industrial facilities have either been founded or reorganized on an economic basis; in addition, he has promoted the achievements of Swedish industry abroad. Among such contributions from Wallenberg's side can be mentioned the founding of AB Papyrus (1895), Svenska Dieselbolaget (1898), Svensk-Dansk-Ryska Telefonaktiebolaget (1900) and Mexican Telefon AB Ericsson (1905). Other companies founded or co-founded by Wallenberg include Virsbo AB, AS Tyssefaldene and AB Sydafrikanska Handelskompaniet and more. He worked with the investigation of Fernaverken's business (1891–1903), the reconstruction of Allmänna Svenska Elektriska AB (ASEA) (1905 and subsequent years), the reorganization of Nordiska trävaru AB (1908), the reorganization of Kopparbergs & Hofors sågverks AB (1912) and of Wifstavarfs AB (1912). Along with the Norwegian Sam Eyde, he founded Norsk hydro elektrisk kvælstofsaktieselskab in 1905, whose facilities at Notodden in Norway have been epoch-making for the extraction of nitrogen compounds from the air. Wallenberg was the leading representative in Sweden of the modern pursuit of industry concentration under the leadership of the major banks. His strong interest in industrial development gave him reason to, together with E. J. Ljungberg in 1910, found the Federation of Swedish Industries (Sveriges Industriförbund). Wallenberg was chairman, vice chairman or board member of Diligentia, Investor AB, Emissionsinstitutet, Papyrus, Försäkringsaktiebolaget Freja and Skandia, Kopparfors AB, Compagnie d'applications mécaniques (France), State Bank of Morocco, Stora Kopparbergs Bergslags AB, Storviks Sulfit AB, Wifstavarfs AB, Yngeredsfors Kraft AB as well as Norsk hydro elektrik kvælstofsaktieselskab and Orkla Mining Company in Norway. A stately testimony to the significance of his efforts in these various fields leaves the Ekonomiska studier, tillägnade Marcus Wallenberg på hans 50-årsdag ("Economic Studies, dedicated to Marcus Wallenberg on his 50th birthday", 1914), a festschrift authored by about thirty collaborators in the field of practical and theoretical economics.

Wallenberg, who was widely used for committee assignments in banking legislation and related matters, was from 1917 a member of the Trade Council (Handelsrådet). During World War I, he was repeatedly called upon to bring about trade agreements with England and its allies. He was thus a member of the Swedish negotiating delegation, which in the autumn of 1916 was sent to London. After the settlement agreement, which this delegation brought home to Sweden in February 1917, was not approved by the Hammarskjöld Cabinet, Wallenberg was sent back to London the same year in November by the Edén-Hellner Cabinet as a member of a new negotiating delegation. The agreements, which were now signed on 29 May 1918 with England, France, the United States and Italy and which assured Sweden of the supply of food and other necessities against the leasing of tonnage to the Triple Entente, and the restriction of exports to the Central Powers, were primarily Wallenberg's work. In the winter of 1919, Wallenberg had to monitor Sweden's interests in financial matters on behalf of the Swedish government during the Paris Peace Conference and in 1920 was Sweden's representative at the Brussels Finance Conference.

In 1920 he became a member of the League of Nations' newly established Financial Committee, of which he was chairman from 1921 to 1922. In 1921, Wallenberg founded the Swedish Taxpayers' Association. Wallenberg participated in leading positions in the implementation of the Dawes Plan, and was the sole permanent arbitrator in disputes concerning the interpretation and application of the law, the financial burden on German industry and was a member of the permanent arbitration tribunal for disputes concerning the Dawes Plan application.

== Personal life ==
On 19 August 1890, Wallenberg married Gertrud Amalia Hagdahl (1864–1959), the daughter of Charles Emil Hagdahl and Emilia Gylling on 19 August 1890. The couple had two sons and four daughters; Sonja (1891–1970), Jacob (1892–1980), Andrea (1894–1980), Gertrud (1895–1983), Marcus (1899–1982) and Ebba (1896–1960).

Marcus raised both his sons in a systematic way to prepare them for a career in the family bank. A successful upbringing considering both sons were CEOs of the bank. In 1960, Jacob Wallenberg founded the Marcus and Amalia Wallenberg Foundation in memory of his parents.

== Death ==
Marcus Wallenberg died on 22 July 1943 at the age of 79 at Malmvik Estate in Lindö in Ekerö Municipality. He is buried in the Wallenberg Mausoleum in Malmvik.

== Ancestry ==
Ancestors of Marcus Wallenberg Sr

8. Lector of Theology, Pastor Marcus Wallenberg
4. Marcus Wallenberg
9. Sara Helena Kinnander
2. André Oscar Wallenberg
10. Professor Andreas Barfoth
5. Anna Laurentia Barfoth
11. Elsa Bager
1. Marcus Laurentius Wallenberg, Sr.
12. Johan Peter von Sydow
6. Johan Gustaf von Sydow
13. Charlotta Elisabeth Rudbeck
3. Anna von Sydow
14. Johan Wiggman
7. Eleonora Juliana Wiggman
15. Carolina Hellenstierna

== Awards and decorations ==
=== Swedish ===
- (Sweden) Knight and Commander of the Orders of His Majesty the King (Order of the Seraphim) (17 November 1931)
- (Sweden) Commander Grand Cross of the Order of Vasa (6 June 1923)
- (Sweden) Commander 1st Class of the Order of Vasa (6 December 1913)
- (Sweden) Commander of the Order of Vasa (24 January 1908)
- (Sweden) Knight 1st Class of the Order of Vasa (1898)
- (Sweden) Commander Grand Cross of the Order of the Polar Star (6 June 1918)
- (Sweden) Knight of the Order of the Polar Star (1903)

=== Foreign ===
- (Kingdom of Italy) Knight Grand Cross of the Order of the Crown of Italy
- (Norway) Grand Cross of the Order of St. Olav
- Grand Cross of the Decoration of Honour for Services to the Republic of Austria
- (France) Grand Officer of the Legion of Honour
- (Japan) Third Class of the Order of the Rising Sun

== Honours ==
- Member of the Royal Swedish Academy of Sciences (1939)
- First Honorary member of the Royal Swedish Academy of Engineering Sciences (1920)
- Honorary member of the Federation of Swedish Industries (Sveriges Industriförbund)

Business positions
Preceded by Knut Agathon Wallenberg	CEO of Stockholms Enskilda Bank (SEB); 1911–1920	Succeeded by Joseph Nachmanson
Preceded by Knut Agathon Wallenberg	Chairman of the board of Stockholms Enskilda Bank (SEB); 1938–1943	Succeeded by Johannes Hellner
