= André Oscar Wallenberg =

Swedish businessman and politician (1816–1886)

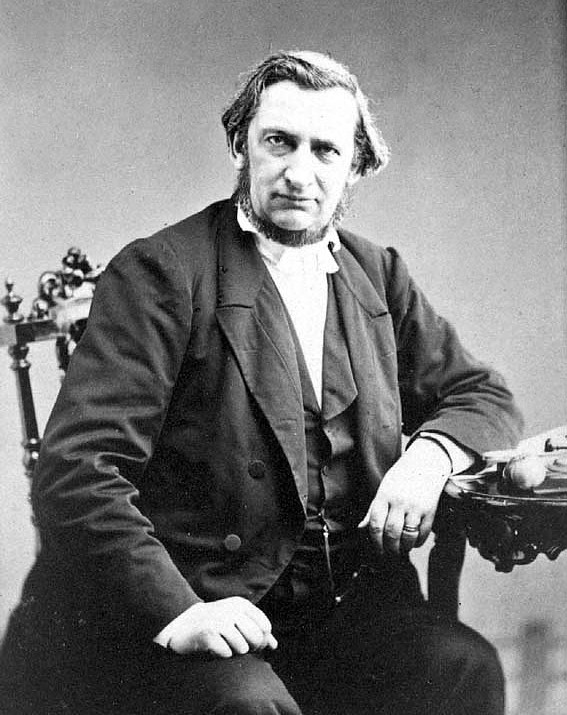
- Born: 19 November 1816; Linköping, Sweden
- Died: 12 January 1886 (aged 69); Stockholm, Sweden
- Resting place: Wallenberg Mausoleum; 59°17′34″N 17°49′48″E
- Occupations: Banker, industrialist
- Known for: Founder of Stockholms Enskilda Bank; Patriarch of the Wallenberg family
- Spouses: Wilhelmina "Mina" Andersson (m. 1846; died 1855) Anna von Sydow (m. 1861)
- Partner: Lovisa Andersson (1855–1861)
- Children: 21, including: Knut Agathon; Marcus Sr.; Gustaf; Victor
- Father: Marcus Wallenberg
- Family: Wallenberg family

André Oscar Wallenberg (19 November 1816 – 12 January 1886) was a Swedish banker, industrialist, naval officer, newspaper tycoon, politician and patriarch of the Wallenberg family. In 1856, Wallenberg founded the Stockholms Enskilda Bank, the predecessor of today's Skandinaviska Enskilda Banken.

== Early life ==
He was son of the bishop of Linköping, Marcus Wallenberg (1774–1833), and his wife Anna Laurentia Barfoth (1783–1862). During his stay in Lund, Marcus Wallenberg had become acquainted with and fell in love with Anna Laurentia Barfoth, the daughter of the medical professor Anders Eilert Barfoth and Ebba Bager, who belonged to a prominent Danish-Scanian family. He married her in 1804. In this marriage, three sons were born, whose baptismal names along with other attention and courtesy to the older generations of the family burst testimony to Marcus Wallenberg's classic interests and perhaps also hopes or predictions about the boys' most distinguished characteristics before or during the impending journey through life. The oldest of the brothers was called Marcus Hilarion (the happy one), the middle one Jacob Agathon (the good) and the youngest André (Andreios – the powerful, the tenacious) Oscar. Marcus Hilarion became a lieutenant in the 1st Life Grenadier Regiment, landowner and owner of Lövingsborg estate, Jakob Agathon, became deputy circuit judge, ombudsman of Östergötlands Enskilda Bank and member of the board of Stockholms Enskilda Bank. But most of all, the bishop's prediction seems to have been based on André Oscar, for he became the most prominent of the brothers.

Wallenberg attended Linköping's trivial school and Linköping gymnasium from 1825 to 1832, and traveled as a deck hand to the Caribbean in 1832 and became a sea cadet on his return. After being commissioned as a naval officer in Karlskrona in 1835, he sailed for a couple of years as a seaman on North American merchant navy ships and in 1837 became a lieutenant in the Swedish Navy. In 1841 he followed as a first mate Göran Adolph Oxehufvud's expedition, which had the La Plata states as destination, but left the expedition in Lisbon and stayed for a year in Spain and France, during which he studied law in Grenoble. From 1846 to 1847 Wallenberg was captain of the first Swedish propeller boat, Linköping. He subsequently devoted himself to the Swedish naval service and served in the Danish Navy in 1849 during the blockade of German coasts. In 1850 Wallenberg became head of a boatswain company in Sundsvall. He now began to engage in business, became a Burgess of Sundsvall, to be eligible for election to a member of parliament and was discharged from military service in 1851 with the rank of premierlöjtnant. In 1855 Wallenberg moved to Stockholm.

== Career ==
As a banker, Wallenberg was a pioneer in Europe. Already during his stay in the United States in 1837, when the Panic of 1837 occurred, he had the desire to become a banker when he "learned how banks should not be run". In Stockholm in 1852, Wallenberg sought to form a branch, but received "no sanction" due to the Sveriges Riksbank's proximity. A few years later, Wallenberg participated in the establishment of branches in Sundsvall and Hudiksvall and became Sundsvallsbanken's first manager. In 1856 he formed Stockholms Enskilda Bank; the capital, 1 billion, was fully subscribed in two days. Until his death, Wallenberg was the CEO of this bank. He introduced promissory notes, interest-free and payable on demand, a novelty, yet almost unknown outside Sweden, and by relatively high deposit rates developed the deposit and the revaluation and depreciation movement. Wallenberg also took an active part in the formation of the Skandinaviska kreditaktiebolaget, and it was to his credit that this bank's head office wasn't placed to Copenhagen, which Carl Frederik Tietgen wanted, but to Gothenburg. In 1861 Wallenberg was involved in the founding of the Stockholms hypotekskassa ('Stockholm Mortgage Bank'). For his financial wishes and ideas, he used the print media extensively. He was co-owner and contributor of the newspaper Bore from 1848 to 1851 and provided both pecuniary support and articles for Stockholms-Posten from 1869 to 1870. In Aftonbladet, Wallenberg wrote Ekonomiskt ('Economically') almost regularly once a week from 1865 to 1868. During the latter part of his life he published articles in various dissimilar newspapers, which seemed to him to promote his purposes.

From 1853 to 1863 Wallenberg was a member of the burghers' estate (Borgarståndet) of the Riksdag of the Estates, in which he soon became known as one of the more powerful and energetic forces of the liberal majority. He was also used by the same in the first three of his parliamentary meetings in the Standing Committee on Banking and Currency, as well as in the fourth and last in the Committee of Supply.

After the Representation Reform of 1865, he represented the City of Stockholm in the Första kammaren (upper house) from the beginning of the new state until his death in Stockholm on 12 January 1886. However, he belonged here to those who thought that the reform work could be delayed and confined it to purely practical issues. Among those to whom he devoted special interest may be mentioned: the introduction of the metric system, the adoption of gold standard as a unit of account, the development of banking legislation, the cancellation of the compulsory rate on the Riksdag's banknotes in accordance with §72 of the Constitution, the cancellation of the Riksdag's sovereignty over Sveriges Riksbank, the introduction of the irrevocable 4 per cent bonds as a type for Swedish government loans, reforms in the debt collection and bankruptcy law, abolition of the wool discount and the convoy commissariat (konvojkommissiariatet), new provisions concerning the measurement of ships, port tariffs, pilotage, improvement of officials' pay conditions, introduction of open voting in parliament, determination of unmarried women's age of majority to 21 years, extension of the right of married women to themselves take possession of inherited and acquired property etc. It was also on his initiative that the Swedish Riksdag made the decision to appoint a prime minister as head of the king's council. Wallenberg, who was a member of the Committee of Supply from 1867 to 1870, otherwise made himself known as one of the power-owning Lantmanna Party's most unforgiving adherents and was vigorously active at the Riksdag of 1883 to bring the army order and tax proposals of Arvid Posse's government to a fall.

In the municipal life of the capital, Wallenberg played a particularly significant role. He served in the Stockholm City Council (Stockholms stadsfullmäktige) from the introduction of this institution to his death and in 1876–1877 as its deputy chairman and for a number of years as a member of the Drafting Committee (Beredningsutskottet).

In 1867 Wallenberg was Sweden's official representative at the international monetary conference in Paris, where his proposal that all states should agree on the same alloy in the gold coins was adopted. He was also considerably employed by committees on matters of an economic nature. His financial activities are characterized by rare foresight, paired with energy and power, but also by a ruthlessness that made him, before and after his death, one of the more contentious.

== Personal life ==
Wallenberg fathered 21 children.

Wallenberg married in 1846 to Catharina Wilhelmina ("Mina") Andersson (1826–1855), with whom he had four children; the daughter Oscara (1847–1863), the sons Jacob (1851–1872), Knut Agathon (1853–1938), and Wilhelm (1855–1910).

After Mina's death, he lived with her sister Lovisa Andersson from 1855 to 1861.

Wallenberg married in 1861 to Anna Eleonora Charlotta von Sydow (1838–1910), the daughter of Rear Admiral Johan Gustaf von Sydow and his wife Eleonora Juliana Wiggman. They had 14 children; the sons Gustaf (1863–1937), Marcus (1864–1943), Louis (1867–1869), Oscar (1872–1939), Axel (1874–1963), Victor (1875–1970), and the daughters Mrs. Anna Bergenstråhle (1865–1950), Countess Siri Oxenstierna (1868–1929), Mrs. Ingeborg Qvarnström (1870–1929), Mrs. Lilly Crafoord (1873–1956), Baroness Alfhild af Ugglas (1877–1952), Oscara (1878–1880), Baroness Ruth von Essén (1880–1972), and Thyra (born and died 1884).

== Ancestry ==
Ancestors of André Oscar Wallenberg

16. Maintenance farmer, Pehr Hansson
8. Sheriff, Jacob Wallberg
17. Kerstin Jacobsdotter Schuut
4. Lector of theology, Marcus Wallenberg
18. Vicar, Markus Tillberg
9. Anna Kristina Tillberg
19. Anna Maria Molenia
2. Marcus Wallenberg
20. Lars Amundsson
10. Vicar, Dean Erik Kinnander
21. Maria Eriksdotter
5. Sara Helena Kinnander
22. Sheriff, Magnus Philander
11. Catharina Maria Philander
23. Apollonia Ekerman
1. Andre Oscar Wallenberg
24. Vicar, Henrik Barfoth
12. Vicar Eilert Hilarius David Magnus Barfoth
25. Agneta Warberg
6. Professor, Andreas Barfoth
26. Vicar, Andreas Johanni Nelander
13. Anna Nelander
27. Margareta Rydelia
3. Anna Laurentia Barfoth
28. Burgher, merchant of Malmö, Jöns Bager
14. Merchant of Lund and Malmö, Jacob Jönsson Bager
29. Margareta Brun
7. Elsa Bagger
30. Grand burgher of Malmö, Lars Hammarlund
15. Maria Laurentia Hammarlund
31. Helena Maria Nobelia

== See also ==
- Wallenberg family
