= Cossva Anckarsvärd =

Swedish diplomat (1865–1953)

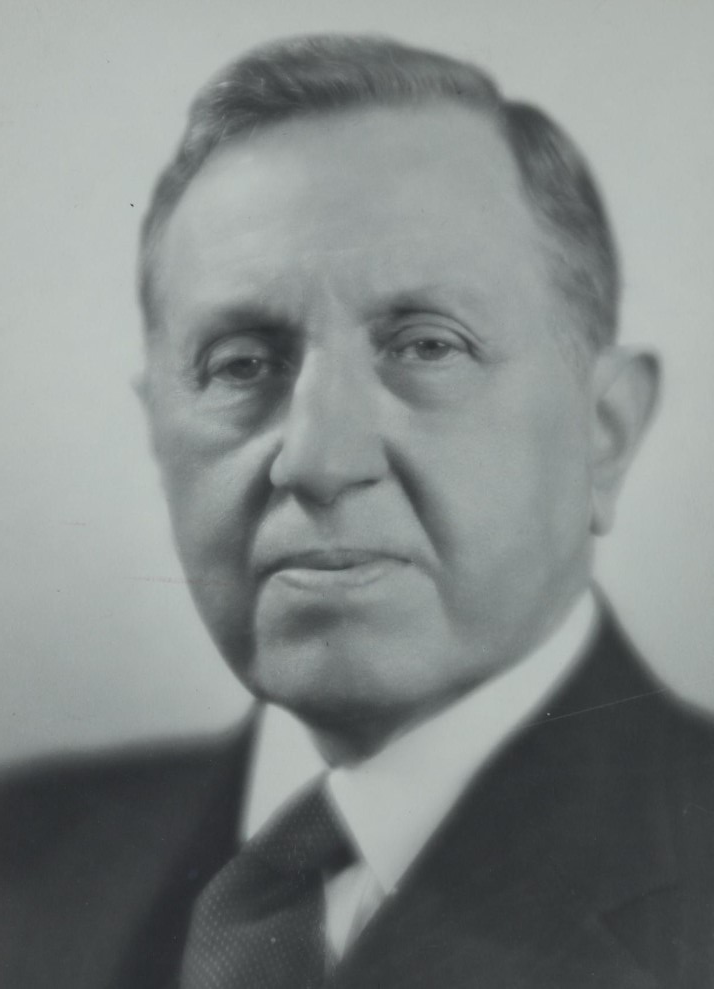
- Born: Per Gustaf August Cossva Anckarsvärd; 17 August 1865; Stockholm, Sweden
- Died: 25 September 1953 (aged 88); Stockholm, Sweden
- Education: Uppsala University
- Occupation: Diplomat
- Years active: 1889–1932
- Spouse: Maude Marie Agnes Duryea (m. 1911; died 1949)
- Children: 3

Per Gustaf August Cossva Anckarsvärd (17 August 1865 – 25 September 1953) was a Swedish diplomat. Anckarsvärd had a long career in Swedish diplomacy, spanning over four decades. After starting as a notary at the Svea Court of Appeal in 1889, he quickly rose through the ranks, becoming second secretary in the Ministry for Foreign Affairs in 1896 and later serving as deputy director and head of its Consular Department in 1903. He held key positions as envoy extraordinary and minister plenipotentiary in Constantinople, where he was an eyewitness to the Armenian genocide, and later in Warsaw, where he served until 1931. Throughout his career, Anckarsvärd also held ceremonial roles, such as chamberlain to the Royal Court and herald in the Order of the Seraphim. He retired in 1932.

== Early life ==
Anckarsvärd was born on 17 August 1865 in Stockholm, Sweden, and was the son of Theodor Anckarsvärd (1816–1878), an architect, and his wife Ellen Nyström (1833–1898). He passed his matriculation examination on 19 May 1884 and enrolled as a student at Uppsala University on 16 January 1885. He completed his preliminary examination on 15 September 1886 and passed the legal examination on 12 September 1889.

== Career ==
Anckarsvärd was appointed extraordinary notary at the Svea Court of Appeal on 26 September 1889. On 13 June 1890, he became an attaché, followed by his appointment as valet de chambre on 26 June 1890. He was made acting second secretary in the Ministry for Foreign Affairs on 25 May 1890 and became second secretary there on 16 October 1896. Anckarsvärd was appointed chamberlain to the Royal Court of Sweden on 9 June 1899 and served as herald in the Order of the Seraphim (Kungl. Maj:ts Orden) from 26 November 1900 to 1906.

He became first secretary in the Ministry for Foreign Affairs on 5 December 1901 and was appointed legation secretary in Berlin on 3 May 1903. Later that year, on 27 August 1903, he became deputy director (kansliråd) and head of the Consular Department at the Ministry for Foreign Affairs. On 28 September 1906, Anckarsvärd was named envoy extraordinary and minister plenipotentiary to Constantinople (now Istanbul), while also serving as consul general there. He was appointed consular judge on 3 December 1909. On 8 April 1914, he also became envoy to Sofia.

Anckarsvärd was Swedish envoy in Constantinople during the Armenian genocide, and thus one of its eyewitnesses. During the events, Anckarsvärd highlighted the aim of the Young Turk government and its policies to "exterminate the Armenian nation".

On 20 February 1920, he assumed the role of envoy extraordinary and minister plenipotentiary in Warsaw. He served in this position until 1931. Anckarsvärd retired in 1932.

== Personal life ==
Anckarsvärd married Maude Marie Agnes Duryea (1880–1949) on 20 November 1900, in New York City. Maude was born on 20 August 1880, in New York City, the daughter of Peter Duryea and Matilda Filkins. They had the following children: Carl Magnus Cossva (born 1 December 1901 in Stockholm), Ellen Maude (born 19 June 1904 in Berlin) and Dagmar Maria (born 10 January 1909 in Constantinople).

== Awards and decorations ==
- (Sweden) King Gustaf V's Jubilee Commemorative Medal (1928)
- (Sweden) Commander Grand Cross of the Order of the Polar Star (6 June 1916)
- (Sweden) Commander 1st Class of the Order of the Polar Star (24 January 1908)
- (Sweden) Knight of the Order of the Polar Star (27 November 1905)
- (Denmark) Grand Cross of the Order of the Dannebrog (1910)
- Grand Cross of the Order of the White Rose of Finland (1922)
- (Poland) Grand Cross of the Order of Polonia Restituta
- (Kingdom of Yugoslavia) Grand Cross of the Order of St. Sava (1920)
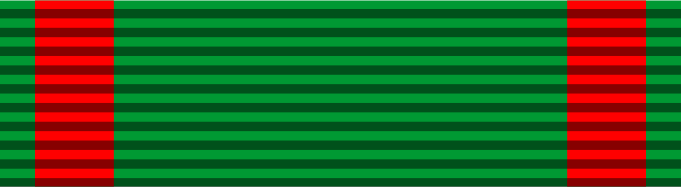
- (Ottoman Empire) 1st Class of the Order of Osmanieh (1907)
- (Ottoman Empire) 1st Class of the Order of the Medjidie (1920)
- (Saxe-Weimar-Eisenach) Commander of the Order of the White Falcon (1901)
- (Kingdom of Italy) Knight of the Order of the Crown of Italy (22 May 1892)
- (Norway) Knight 1st Class of the Order of St. Olav (21 January 1904)
- (Kingdom of Prussia) Knight 4th Class of the Order of the Crown (7 March 1894)
- (Thailand) 4th Class of the Order of the Crown of Siam (1897)

== See also ==
- Witnesses and testimonies of the Armenian genocide

Diplomatic posts
Preceded by ?	Consul General of Sweden in Constantinople; 1906–1909	Succeeded by ?
Preceded by Charles Emil Ramel	Envoy of Sweden to the Ottoman Empire; 1906–1920	Succeeded by Gustaf Wallenberg
Preceded by None	Envoy of Sweden to Bulgaria; 1914–1920	Succeeded by Gustaf Wallenberg
Preceded by Ivan Danielsson as Chargé d'affaires	Envoy of Sweden to Poland; 1920–1931	Succeeded by Einar Hennings
