= List of ambassadors of Sweden to Bulgaria =

Ambassador of Sweden to Bulgaria
- Lesser coat of arms of the Kingdom of Sweden
- Incumbent; Pontus Melander since 2025
- Ministry for Foreign Affairs; Swedish Embassy, Sofia
- Style: His or Her Excellency (formal); Mr. or Madam Ambassador (informal)
- Reports to: Minister for Foreign Affairs
- Residence: Shipchenski Prohod 16 (Note: During the period when Sweden maintained a diplomatic mission in Sofia, the ambassador's residence was located at Shipchenski Prohod 16.)
- Seat: Stockholm, Sweden (Note: Since 2010, Sweden has had a Stockholm-based ambassador to Bulgaria.)
- Appointer: Government of Sweden
- Term length: No fixed term
- Inaugural holder: Cossva Anckarsvärd
- Formation: 8 April 1914
- Website: Swedish Embassy, Sofia

The Ambassador of Sweden to Bulgaria (known formally as the Ambassador of the Kingdom of Sweden to the Republic of Bulgaria) is the official representative of the government of Sweden to the president of Bulgaria and government of Bulgaria. Since 2010, the ambassador is based in Stockholm.

== History ==
Sweden's representation in Bulgaria began on 26 October 1906, with the establishment of an honorary consulate in Sofia. Initially, the consulate operated under the jurisdiction of the consulate general in Constantinople, but on 26 April 1907, it was upgraded to an independent consulate general. Diplomatic relations between Sweden and Bulgaria were officially established in 1909.

On 6 May 1914, the Swedish minister in Constantinople, Cossva Anckarsvärd, was also appointed as minister to the Bulgarian court. On 19 June 1914, Anckarsvärd presented his credentials to King Ferdinand I of Bulgaria in Sofia.

In 1935, the accreditation for Sofia was transferred from the Swedish minister in Constantinople to the Swedish minister in Bucharest. In January 1951, it was reported that the position of head of mission in Bucharest would be discontinued. The responsibility for Sweden's representation in Romania, Bulgaria, and Hungary would thereafter be divided between Belgrade, Moscow, and Prague, with Sweden being represented in those countries by lower-ranking personnel for the time being. The Swedish ambassador in Moscow was subsequently accredited to Sofia.

In January 1964, a statement from the Committee of Supply proposed the establishment of a new diplomatic mission in Sofia. The proposal was approved in March of the same year. In April the Swedish legation was granted the rank and status of an embassy.

On 21 January 2010, the Reinfeldt cabinet announced the closure of six Swedish embassies, including the one in Bulgaria. The embassy in Sofia was closed on 30 September 2010. Instead, a Stockholm-based ambassador was accredited to Bulgaria and visits the country regularly.

== List of representatives ==
Name	Period	Resident / Non-resident	Title	Resident / Concurrent accreditation	Notes	Presented credentials	Ref
Kingdom of Bulgaria (1908–1946)
Cossva Anckarsvärd	8 April 1914 – 1920	Non-resident	Envoy	Resident in Constantinople		19 June 1914	
Gustaf Wallenberg	1921–1930	Non-resident	Envoy	Resident in Constantinople			
Carl von Heidenstam	14 July 1930 – 1931	Non-resident	Envoy	Resident in Istanbul			
Erik Boheman	1931–1934	Non-resident	Envoy	Resident in Istanbul			
Wilhelm Winther	1934–1935	Non-resident	Envoy	Resident in Ankara			
Patrik Reuterswärd	1 July 1935 – 1948	Non-resident	Envoy	Resident in Bucharest			
People's Republic of Bulgaria (1946–1990)
Sven Allard	1949–1951	Non-resident	Envoy	Resident in Bucharest			
Rolf Sohlman	19 October 1951 (Note: Appointed on 1 September 1951.) – 1963	Non-resident	Envoy	Resident in Moscow			
Alma Grünthal	1951–1953	Resident	Chargé d'affaires				
Gunnar Gerring	1964–1969	Resident	Ambassador				
Olof Ripa	1969–1974	Resident	Ambassador				
Gunnar Ljungdahl	1974–1978	Resident	Ambassador				
Manfred Nilsson	1978–1981	Resident	Ambassador				
Hans Andén	1981–1985	Resident	Ambassador				
Åke Berg	1985–1989	Resident	Ambassador				
Republic of Bulgaria (1990–present)
Hans-Olle Olsson	1990–1993	Resident	Ambassador				
Bertil Lund	1993–1998	Resident	Ambassador				
Sten Ask	1998–2003	Resident	Ambassador				
Bertil Roth	2003–2008	Resident	Ambassador				
Paul Beijer	2008–2010	Resident	Ambassador				
Helena Pilsas Ahlin	2010–2015	Non-resident	Ambassador	Resident in Stockholm		29 November 2010	
Louise Bergholm	2015–2020	Non-resident	Ambassador	Resident in Stockholm			
Katarina Rangnitt	September 2020 – 2025	Non-resident	Ambassador	Resident in Stockholm			
Pontus Melander	2025–present	Non-resident	Ambassador	Resident in Stockholm			
