= Knut Agathon Wallenberg =

Swedish banker, politician and diplomat (1853–1938)

Knut Agathon Wallenberg RoKKMO
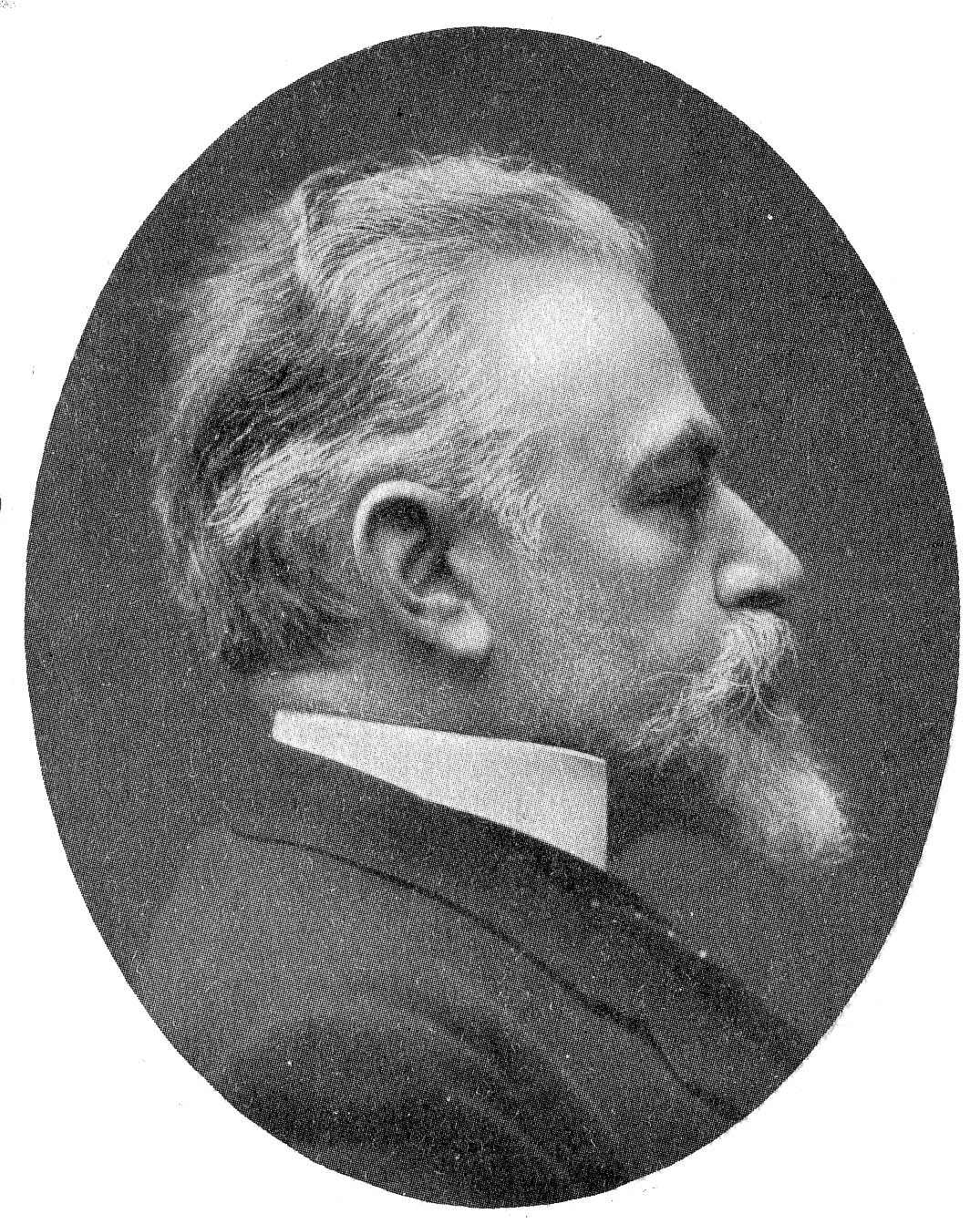

Minister for Foreign Affairs
- In office 1914–1917
- Preceded by: Albert Ehrensvärd
- Succeeded by: Arvid Lindman

Personal details
- Born: 19 May 1853 Stockholm, Sweden
- Died: 1 June 1938 (aged 85) Stockholm, Sweden
- Party: National Party
- Spouse: Alice Nickelsen (m. 1878)
- Occupation: Banker

Knut Agathon Wallenberg RoKKMO (19 May 1853 – 1 June 1938) was a Swedish banker and politician, he was also a Knight of the Order of the Seraphim. Wallenberg was Minister for Foreign Affairs 1914–1917, and member of the Riksdag's Första kammaren (the Upper house) 1907–1919. Together with his wife, he created Knut and Alice Wallenberg Foundation, which is one of the main contributors to the private university Stockholm School of Economics. Wallenberg was one of the founders of the Stockholm School of Economics, and is also seen as the founder of the community of Saltsjöbaden and an associated railroad.

== Early life ==
Wallenberg was born on 19 May 1853 in Katarina Parish, Stockholm, the son of André Oscar Wallenberg (1816–1886) and his first wife Catharina Wilhelmina Andersson (1826–1855). He was the brother of Oscara (1847–1863), Jacob (1851–1872), and Wilhelm (1855–1910). He also had 14 half-siblings, including Gustaf (1863–1937), Marcus (1864–1943), and Victor (1875–1970).

== Career ==
In 1874 Wallenberg was commissioned as a naval officer and became Acting Sub-Lieutenant (Underlöjtnant) in the Swedish Navy the same year and joined the board of Stockholms Enskilda Bank. In 1876 he went to Georgiis' Banking Institution (Georgiis bankinstitut), and he was appointed lieutenant in the navy in 1876, from which he resigned in 1882. Wallenberg was then employed by the Crédit Lyonnais in Paris from 1877 to 1878. After his father's death, Wallenberg, who has long been involved in the management of Stockholms Enskilda Bank, took over as the CEO. In many respects his father's spiritual heir, the company led by him became one of Sweden's foremost, which mediated the taking up of large government loans and other significant deals. He was also the driving force for many in the economic field, including in the creation of the residential community Saltsjöbaden near Stockholm and the railways connecting these places. From 1883 he belonged to the Stockholm City Council (Stockholms stadsfullmäktige) and from 1890 its Drafting Committee (Beredningsutskottet).

== Personal life ==
In 1878 he married Alice Olga Constance Nickelsen (1858–1956). The couple adopted Jeanne Nyström (1885–1962), who was then two years old, in 1887 and she was named Nannie Wallenberg. She was born out of wedlock to Jean Karadja Pasha, and thus half-sister to Constantin Karadja.

== Death ==
Wallenberg died on 1 June 1938 in Skeppsholm Parish, Stockholm.

== Awards ==
=== Swedish ===
- Sweden Knight and Commander of the Orders of His Majesty the King (Order of the Seraphim) (6 June 1916)
- Sweden King Gustaf V's Jubilee Commemorative Medal (1928)
- Sweden Commander Grand Cross of the Order of Vasa (24 January 1912)
- Sweden Commander First Class of the Order of Vasa (23 September 1897)
- Sweden Commander First Class of the Order of the Polar Star (15 October 1906)
- Sweden Knight of the Order of the Polar Star (1890)

=== Foreign ===
- Denmark Grand Cross of the Order of the Dannebrog (between 1910 and 1915)
- Denmark Commander First Class of the Order of the Dannebrog (at the latest 1905)
- France Grand Cross of the Legion of Honour (between 1910 and 1915)
- France Officer of the Legion of Honour (at the latest 1905)
- Norway Grand Cross of the Order of St. Olav (between 1910 and 1915)
- Norway Commander First Class of the Order of St. Olav (at the latest 1905)
- Prussia Knight Second Class of the Order of the Red Eagle with Star (between 1905 and 1908)
- Russian Empire Knight Second Class of the Order of Saint Stanislaus with Star (at the latest 1905)
- Thailand Second Class of the Order of the White Elephant (between 1905 and 1908)

== Honours ==
- Member of the Royal Swedish Academy of Sciences (1928)
- Honorary member of the Royal Swedish Academy of Arts (1913)
- Honorary member of the Royal Swedish Society of Naval Sciences (1914)

== See also ==
- Wallenberg family

Business positions
Preceded by André Oscar Wallenberg	CEO of Stockholms Enskilda Bank (SEB); 1886–1911	Succeeded by Marcus Wallenberg Sr.
Government offices
Preceded by Albert Ehrensvärd	Minister for Foreign Affairs; 1914–1917	Succeeded by Arvid Lindman
