= Stockholms Enskilda Bank =

Swedish bank (1856- 1972)

- Type: Public Aktiebolag
- Industry: Finance
- Founded: 1856
- Founder: André Oscar Wallenberg
- Defunct: 1972
- Fate: Merged
- Successor: SEB Group
- Headquarters: Stockholm, Sweden
- Products: retail banking, mortgage banking, business finance and merchant processing services
- Owner: Wallenberg family

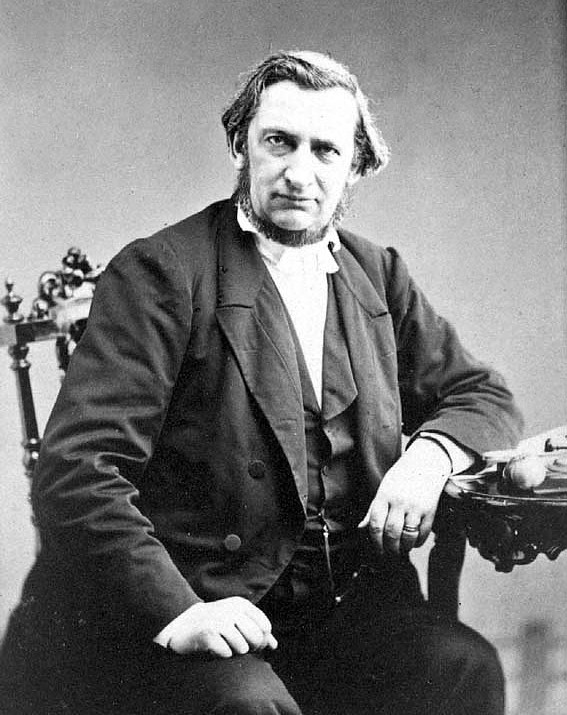
André Oscar Wallenberg (1816–86)

Stockholms Enskilda Bank (lit. 'Private Bank of Stockholm'), sometimes called Enskilda banken or SEB, was a Swedish bank, founded in 1856 by André Oscar Wallenberg as Stockholm's first private bank. In 1857, Stockholms Enskilda Bank began to employ women, claiming to be the first bank to do.

Stockholms Enskilda Bank was managed by the Wallenberg family who, thanks to the bank, built a unique position in Swedish business. During World War II, the Wallenberg bank was accused of collaborating with Nazi Germany, putting the bank on blockade by the U.S. Government. In 1972, the bank merged with Skandinaviska Banken to become Skandinaviska Enskilda Banken.

== History ==
Like many other private banks, Stockholms Enskilda Bank had the right to issue banknotes. The right was withdrawn on 15 July 1902. Pictured is a 10 krona banknote from 1876

From the beginning, Stockholms Enskilda Bank mainly issued credit to industry, and soon banker's drafts were introduced to simplify the conveyance of payments. Towards the end of the 19th century, Stockholms Enskilda Bank played an active role in industrial construction, both as a lender and as an initiator. The bank took over or participated in bond loans of over SEK 80 million to the state, municipalities, industry and railways.

In some areas the bank became a pioneer of the 19th century. In 1857, Stockholms Enskilda Bank claimed to be the first bank in the world to employ women and in 1892, pensions schemes were proposed for the bank's staff.

In 1912 Stockholms Enskilda Bank was one of the founding owners of the British Bank of Northern Commerce, which specialized in fostering trade between the United Kingdom and northern Europe. In 1920 the British Bank merged with C.J. Hamros & Son to form Hambros Bank, with the Stockholms Enskilda taking shares in Hambros.

=== International recession ===
In the end of the 1920s, the international recession spread over Europe, and things came to a head when Ivar Kreuger died in Paris in March 1932. Jacob Wallenberg was a member of the international Kreuger Committee, which was to look after the bondholders' interests.

=== Second World War ===
Before and during the Second World War the Swedish government called upon the bank's management for trade negotiations with Germany, United Kingdom, the United States and Finland.

During the war, in 1939–1941, Stockholms Enskilda Bank acquired a number of subsidiaries within the German Bosch group. The acquisitions were made under the condition of Bosch being able to buy the property back after the war. A similar acquisition was made regarding the American Bosch Corporation. The U.S. Government considered the acquisitions illegal and the American Bosch Corporation as enemy property, and subsequently confiscated it in 1943. In August 1945, the bank and the Wallenberg brothers were further accused for collaborating with the Nazis, making the U.S. Government impose a blockade on Stockholms Enskilda Bank. The blockade was lifted in 1947.

=== Post war period ===
After the War, in 1946, the first collective agreement for commercial bank employees was concluded, and in 1949 staff-management committees with representatives for management and employees were introduced. In 1953, Stockholms Enskilda Bank began using "bank buses" as ambulating branch branches, and the bank was modernized, including the introduction of punched card machines. Payment by wage cheque was introduced in 1956 and the bank began to cash other bank's cheques.

During the 1960s Stockholms Enskilda Bank became the bank for the industry to a greater extent. Loans to industry constituted half of the total loans of SEK 2,000 million. New branch offices were opened as part of the battle for domestic deposits. By the end of the 1960s the number of branches was 52.

=== Merger with Skandinaviska Banken ===
On 1 January 1972, Skandinaviska Banken and Stockholms Enskilda Bank merged to form Skandinaviska Enskilda Banken, with the aim of creating a bank which could meet the competition from the major international banks. The new bank had 6,730 employees, 393 branches, a well-established customer base and good relationships with many of Sweden's biggest companies.

However, the main reason for the merger was the socialistic economical politics that the, at the time, very left-orientated socialdemocratic party forced on banks and private companies. Only a certain level of profit was allowed, and when Stockholms Enskilda Bank tried to expand, this action was forced back by the Swedish government. Thus the merge with Skandinaviska Banken which created room for an expanding the bank.

At the time of the merger, Skandinaviska Banken was about three times bigger than Stockholms Enskilda Bank and the Wallenberg family was notably divided whether the merger should take place. The plan had originally been initiated by chairman Marcus Wallenberg (junior) whereas the former chairman of the bank, Jacob Wallenberg was a vocal opponent of the merger. This created some anxiety among the bank staff, and in November 1971, the CEO, Marc Wallenberg – who was one of the top negotiators of the merger – committed suicide, leaving the Wallenberg family without a natural successor in the banking business.

== Chairmen of the board ==
| Year | Chairmen of the board of SEB |
|---|---|
| 1856–1864 | L J Lovén |
| 1864–1871 | V Cramér |
| 1871–1874 | W Vretman |
| 1875–1881 | H Hamilton |
| 1881–1898 | F Wretman |
| 1898–1911 | Otto Printzsköld |
| 1911–1914 | Knut Agathon Wallenberg |
| 1914–1917 | Otto Printzsköld |
| 1917–1938 | Knut Agathon Wallenberg |
| 1938–1943 | Marcus Wallenberg Sr. |
| 1944–1946 | Johannes Hellner |
| 1946–1950 | R Ljunglöf |
| 1950–1969 | Jacob Wallenberg |
| 1969–1971 | Marc Wallenberg |

== Chief executives ==
| Year | Chief executives of SEB |
|---|---|
| 1856–1886 | André Oscar Wallenberg |
| 1886–1911 | Knut Agathon Wallenberg |
| 1911–1920 | Marcus Wallenberg Sr. |
| 1920–1927 | Joseph Nachmanson |
| 1927–1946 | Jacob Wallenberg |
| 1946–1958 | Marcus Wallenberg Jr. |
| 1958–1971 | Marc Wallenberg |
| 1971 | Hans Munck af Rosenschöld |

=== Key people ===
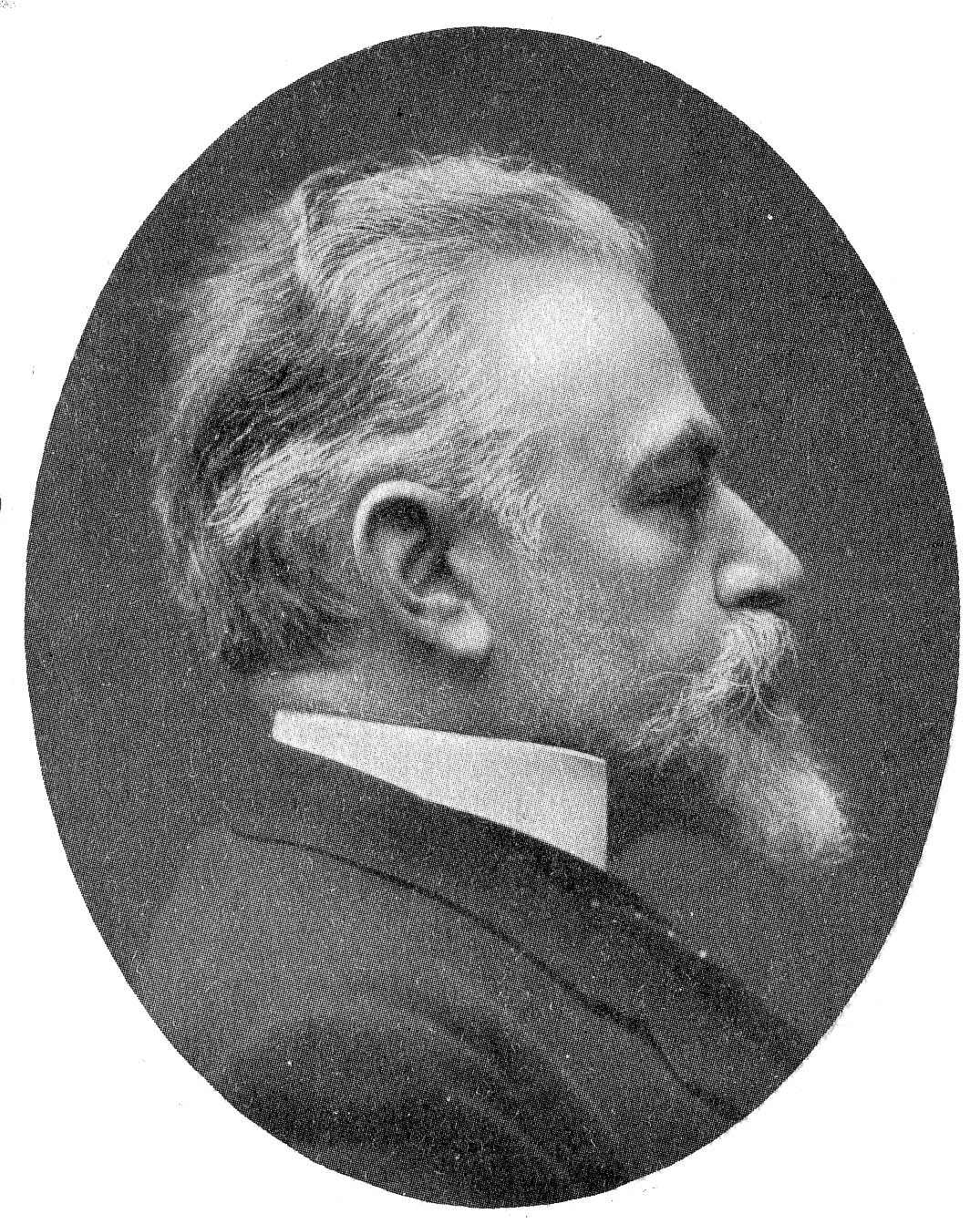
Knut Agathon Wallenberg
(1853–1938)

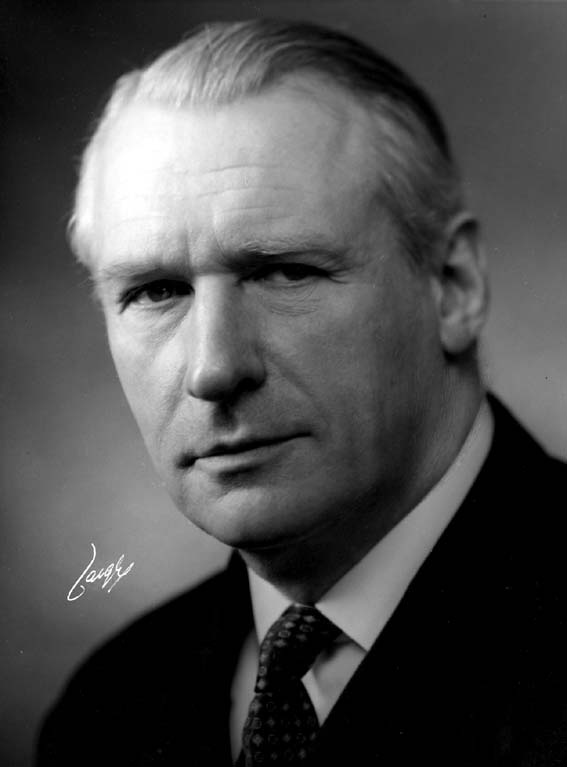
Jacob Wallenberg
(1892–1980)

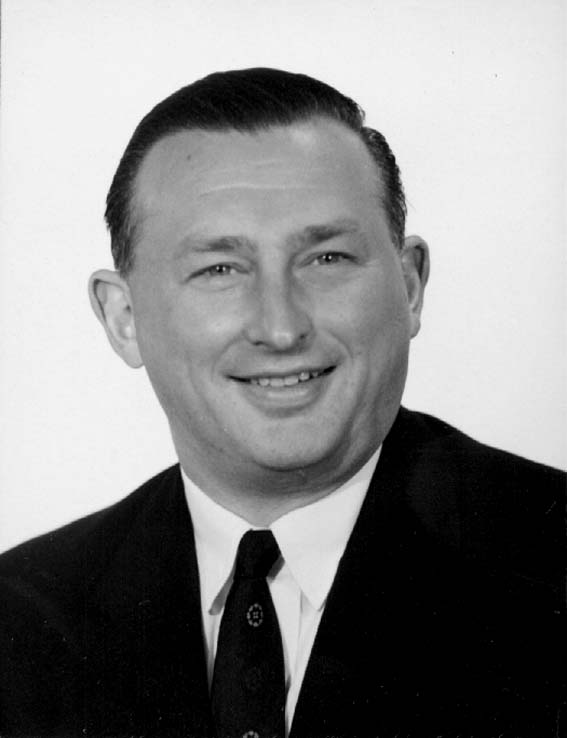
Marc Wallenberg
(1924–71)
