= Varatuomari =

Finnish legal title

Varatuomari (lit. 'vice-judge' or 'reserve judge'; Swedish: vicehäradshövding), or Master of Laws with court training, is a Finnish legal title for a qualified lawyer who has been trained on the bench and is equipped to appear before a court.

The title dates back to the 1700s, when Finland was part of Sweden. In Sweden, the title was abolished in 1894 and reintroduced with a different meaning from 1918 until its elimination in 1926. It was reintroduced by the 1918 statute on the administration of court cases, which was replaced by the 1920 statute. However, the latter institution had a substantially different meaning than the former; the deputy chief justice was paid by the state and the requirements for obtaining such an office were considerably stricter. It was now necessary to have served as a member or tax collector in a court of appeal for a total of at least one year or as an auditor's secretary.

In Finland, the title is granted by the Judicial Training Board, following the completion of a Master's degree in law and a one-year court training period as a Trainee District Judge in a District Court, or partially in an Administrative Court or a Court of Appeals. The Board also carries out the centralised application procedure for court traineeships and selects and appoints Trainees to District Courts, Administrative Courts and Courts of Appeal, and grants the candidates who successfully complete the court traineeship the right to use this qualification.

The title is not a formal requirement for public sector legal offices, but it remains a de facto requirement when applying for the positions of e.g. judge or prosecutor. In addition, it is recognised as a relevant qualification for appointments into senior police officer positions.

== See also ==
- Barrister
