= Marcus Wallenberg (bishop) =

Swedish bishop

- Bishop of Linköping
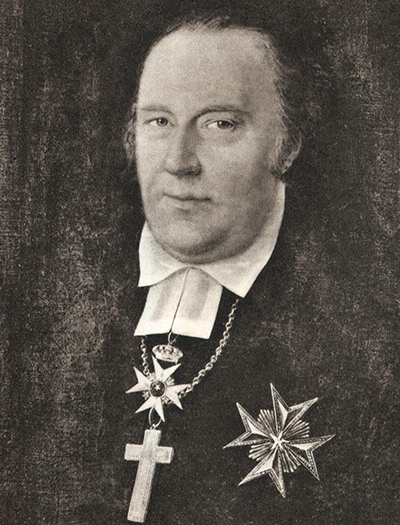
- Church: Church of Sweden
- Diocese: Linköping
- In office: 1819–1833
- Predecessor: Carl von Rosenstein
- Successor: Johan Jacob Hedrén

Orders
- Ordination: 1817

Personal details
- Born: 24 June 1774 Linköping, Kingdom of Sweden
- Died: 22 September 1833 (aged 59) Linköping, Sweden-Norway
- Denomination: Lutheran
- Parents: Marcus Wallenberg; Sara Helena Kinnander
- Children: André Oscar
- Education: Uppsala University

Marcus Wallenberg (June 1774 – 22 September 1833) was a Swedish theologian who served as the Bishop of Linköping between 1819 and 1833.

== Early life ==
Marcus Wallenberg was born in Linköping where his father, Marcus Wallenberg, was a vicar. His mother was Sara Helena Kinnander. Wallenberg studied at Uppsala University from 1790, was promoted to master of philosophy in 1797, and obtained a bachelor's degree in juris utriusque in the same year.

== Career ==
He became a docent in Roman eloquence from 1800, but was forced to leave Uppsala the same year after the so-called music trial and moved to Lund. In 1802 he became a consistory notary in Linköping and in 1805 a lecturer in Greek at the high school there. He was ordained a priest in 1817, promoted to doctor of theology in 1818 in connection with Charles XIV John's ascension to the throne, and between 1819 and 1833 was bishop in the diocese of Linköping. He proved the Riksdags in 1823 and 1828–1830.

In the years 1814–1815 Wallenberg translated the Iliad and 1819–1821 the Odyssey.

On November 25, 1801, Wallenberg was elected as member 207 of the Royal Academy of Music. On January 23, 1821, he became an honorary member of the Royal Academy of History and Antiquities.

Marcus Wallenberg is buried at Gamla griftegården, Linköping.

== Family ==
In 1804, Wallenberg married Anna Laurentia Barfoth (1783–1862), daughter of professor Anders Barfoth at Lund University and Ebba Bager. Together they had the children Laurentia Maria Wallenberg (1805–1806), Marcus Hilarion Wallenberg (1807–1842), Jacob Agathon Wallenberg (1808–1887), Carl August Wallenberg (1811–1811) and André Oscar Wallenberg (1816–1886).

== See also ==
- Wallenberg family

Religious titles
Preceded by Carl von Rosenstein	Bishop of Linköping; 1819–1833	Succeeded by Johan Jacob Hedrén
