= Skandinaviska Banken =

Swedish bank (1864- 1972)

Skandinaviska Banken (lit. 'Scandinavian Bank') was a Swedish bank founded in Gothenburg, 1864. Its foundation coincided with the political aspirations of the Scandinavian movement, which sought to unite Sweden, Norway and Denmark into a single kingdom. Even if these aspirations came to naught, there was a Scandinavian Monetary Union, with a common currency, and a union between Sweden and Norway, that the bank potentially would be able to exploit.

The bank was founded as Skandinaviska Kreditaktiebolaget, which roughly translates to "Scandinavian Credit Ltd.". During the early 1900s the bank underwent rapid expansion through the following mergers: Industrikreditaktiebolaget i Stockholm in 1907, Skånes Enskilda Bank in 1910, and Sveriges Privata Centralbank in 1917. Furthermore, Skandinaviska Banken acquired Örebro Enskilda Bank in 1918, and Skånska Handelsbanken in 1919.

Skandinaviska Kreditaktiebolaget, as it was known as at the time, was the main bank of Swedish businessman Ivar Kreuger, the founder of Swedish Match AB, and was struck hard by the financial crisis of the 1930s, triggered in Sweden by the breakdown of Kreuger's concern, due to his untimely death in Paris in 1932. As a result, Skandinaviska Kreditaktiebolaget had to accept stock as payment in several companies unable to repay their credit, as well as a SEK200 million bail-out from the Swedish government. The bank continued to prosper and the bail-out sum was already repaid in 1936, and the new company stocks were transferred into an investment holding company, AB Custos, founded in 1937. In 1939, Skandinaviska Kreditaktiebolaget changed its name to Skandinaviska Banken and continued its expansion by acquiring local banks throughout the 20th century until 1972, when it merged with Stockholms Enskilda Bank to form Skandinaviska Enskilda Banken (SEB), today one of the largest Nordic banks.

== See also ==
- Swedish krona
- List of banks in Sweden
