= Victor Wallenberg =

Swedish sport shooter

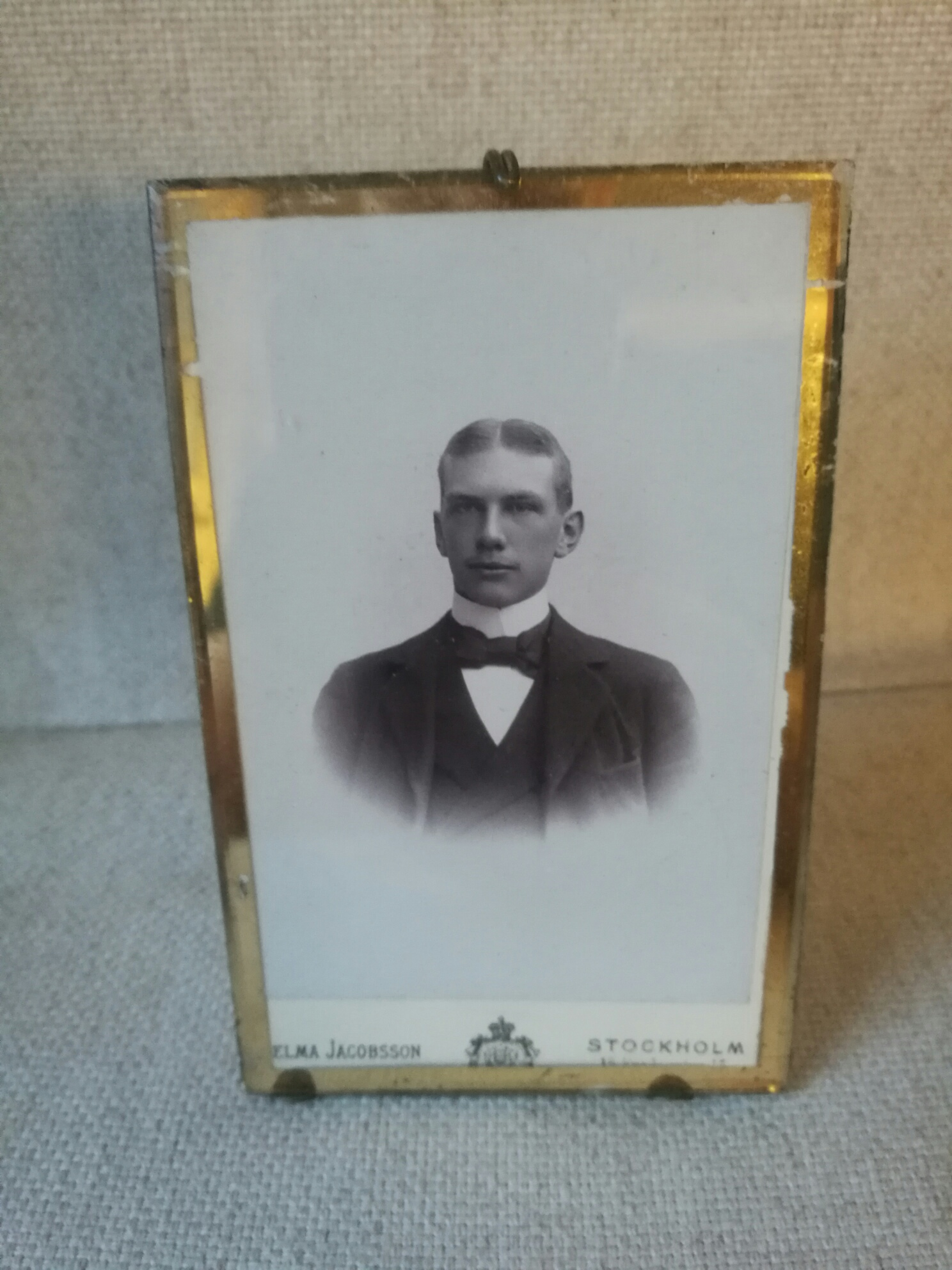

Personal information
- Born: 12 November 1875 Stockholm, Sweden
- Died: 3 November 1970 (aged 94) Saltsjöbaden, Sweden

Sport
- Sport: Sport shooting

Victor Henry Wallenberg (12 November 1875 – 3 November 1970) was a Swedish sport shooter who competed in the 1912 Summer Olympics. In 1912 he was part of the Swedish team which finished fourth in the team clay pigeons event.

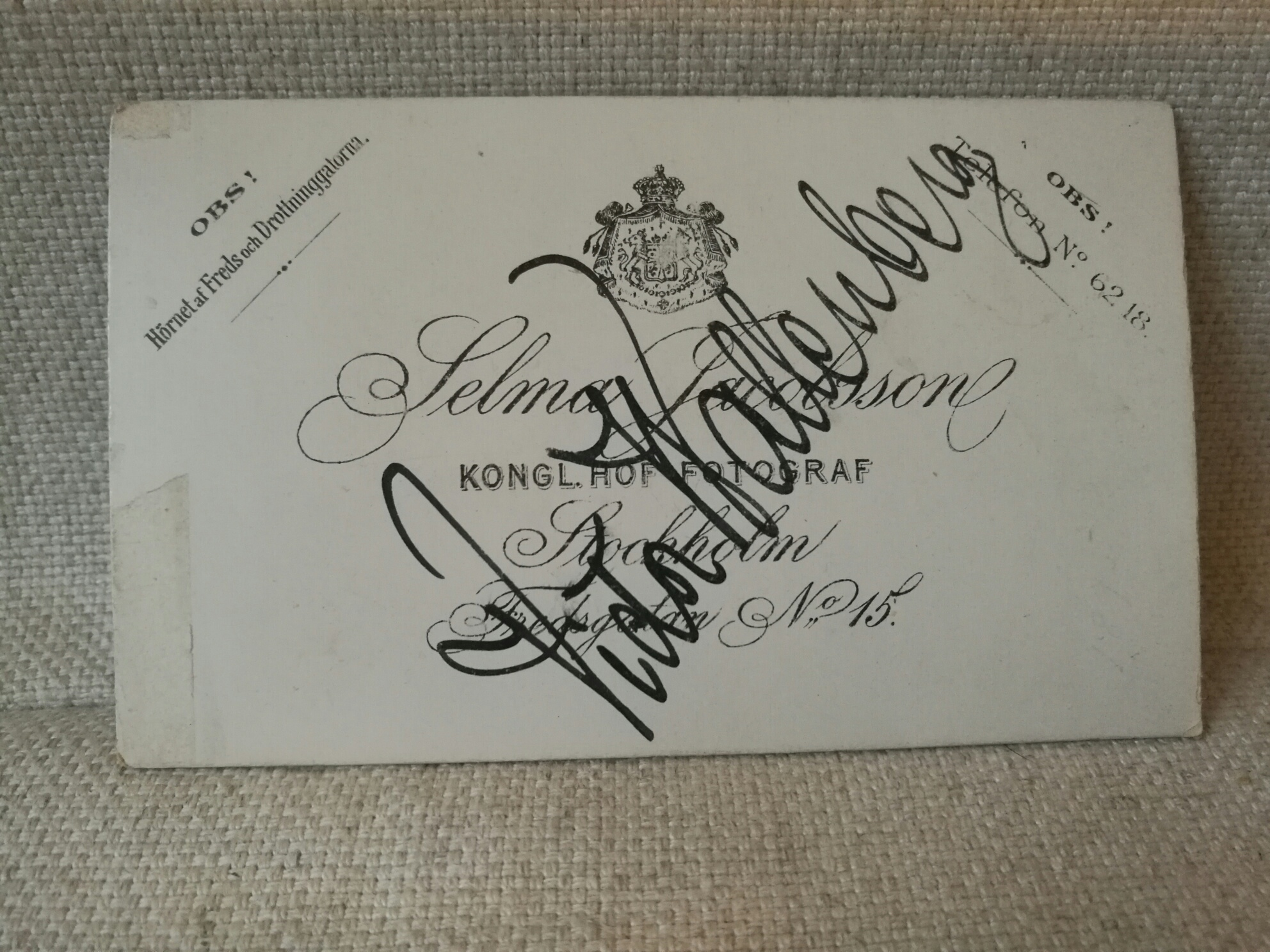

In the individual trap competition he finished 34th. Son of banker André Oscar Wallenberg.

== See also ==
- Wallenberg family
