= Wallenberg family =

Swedish business family

- Business family
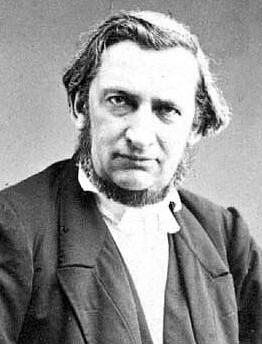
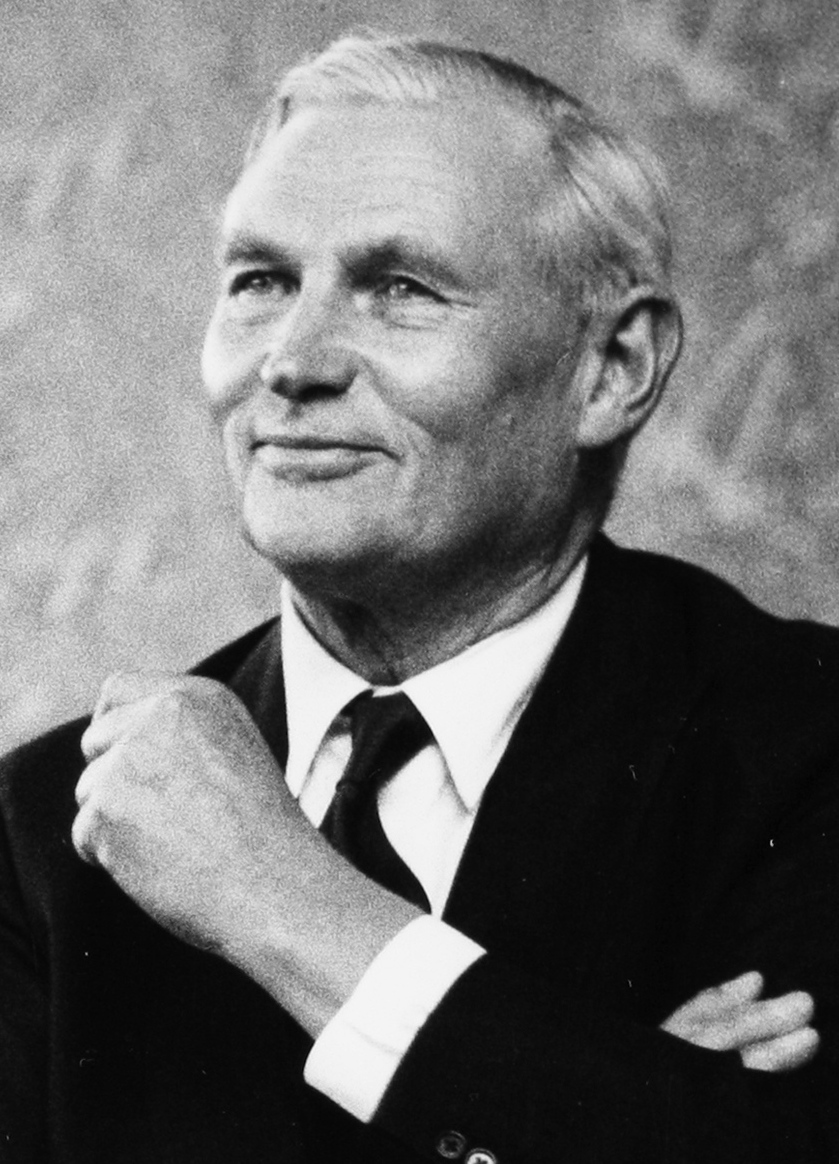
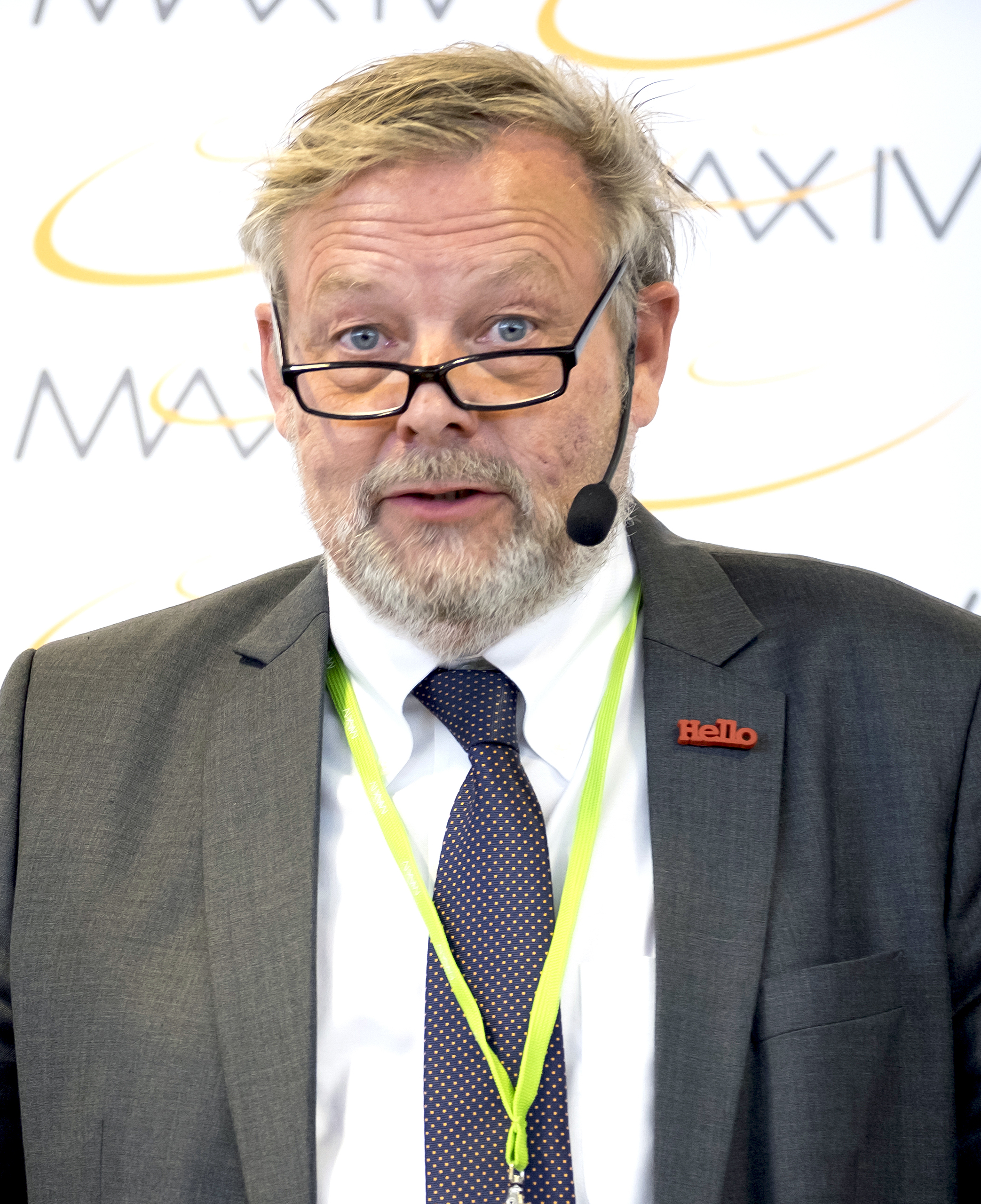
- Andre; Wallenberg Marcus Wallenberg II Peter; Wallenberg II
- Current region: Stockholm County, Sweden
- Founded: Marriage of Per Hansson 1692, Sweden; 334 years ago
- Founder: Per Hansson
- Motto: Esse, non Videri

The Wallenberg family is a prominent Swedish family of bankers, industrialists, politicians, bureaucrats and diplomats, present in most large Swedish industrial groups, including EQT AB, Ericsson, Electrolux, ABB, SAS Group, SKF, Atlas Copco, Saab AB, and more. In the 1970s, the Wallenberg family businesses employed 40% of Sweden's industrial workforce and represented 40% of the total worth of the Stockholm stock market. Their flagship company, Investor AB, has a market capitalization of over $100 billion.

The most famous of the Wallenberg family, Raoul Wallenberg, a diplomat, worked in Budapest, Hungary, during World War II to rescue Jews from the Holocaust. Between July and December 1944, he issued protective passports and housed Jews, saving tens of thousands of Jewish lives. The family is also heavily involved in philanthropy through the Wallenberg foundations, especially the Knut and Alice Wallenberg Foundation.

== History ==
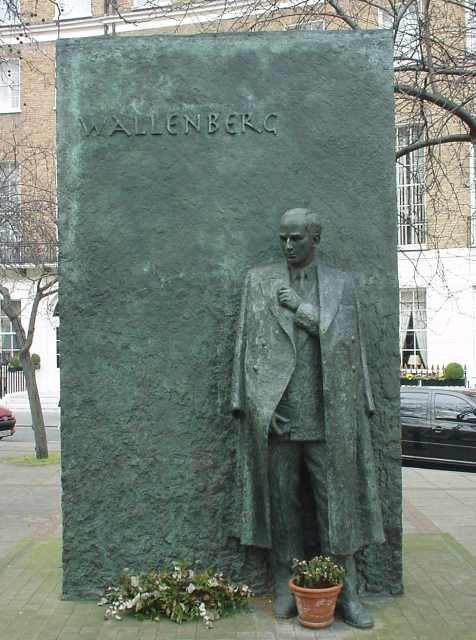
Raoul Wallenberg Memorial Statue, Great Cumberland Place, London

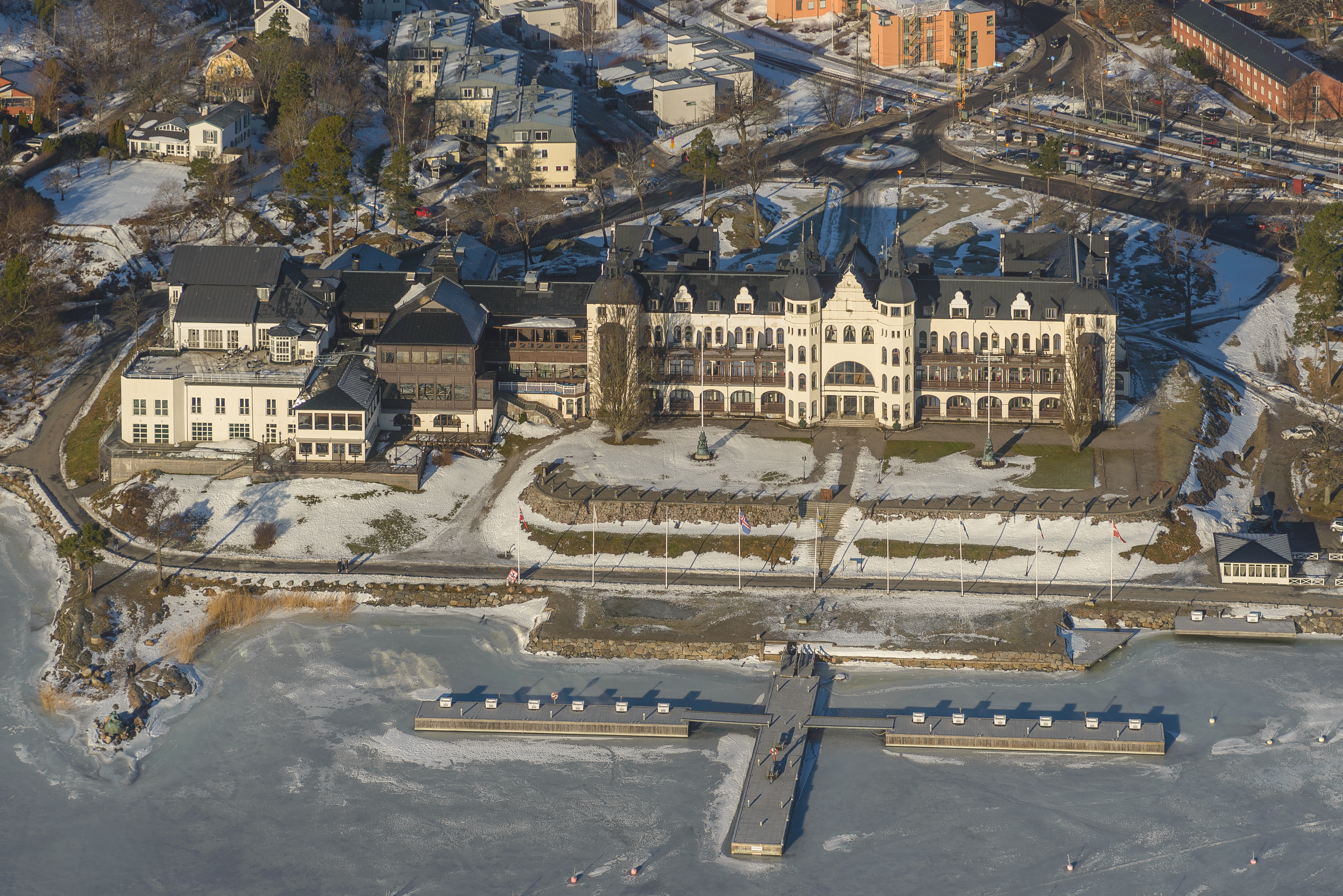
Grand Hotel Saltsjöbaden; built in 1890s by the Wallenberg family

The earliest known member of the Wallenberg family is Per Hansson (1670–1741) who, in 1692, married Kerstin Jacobsdotter Schuut (1671–1752). Their son, Jakob Persson Wallberg (1699–1758) married twice. The children of his first marriage called themselves Wallberg and those of his second called themselves Wallenberg.

=== First generation ===
The family’s business empire began with Jakob Persson Wallberg's great grandson André Oscar Wallenberg who in 1851 at the age of 30 decided to leave his career as a naval officer to capitalize on the new wave of entrepreneurship that he had witnessed evolving in Europe and the Americas. In 1856 he founded Stockholms Enskilda Bank (SEB), the predecessor of today's Skandinaviska Enskilda Banken.

The Wallenberg’s rise to prominence followed an early 1870s boom Sweden suffered a severe economic recession in 1877–78. Rather than allow several large Swedish companies that had borrowed from SEB to go bankrupt, the bank took a shareholding.

=== Second generation ===
André Oscar Wallenberg's son Knut Agathon Wallenberg joined the bank and soon proved himself a skilled businessman, his entrepreneurial talent over his long career ensuring that the growth of the bank and for him to build up a sizable private fortune. Following his father's death, he took over as CEO of Stockholms Enskilda Bank in 1886.

Like many other Wallenberg relatives, Knut Agathon Wallenberg was also involved in Swedish politics and diplomacy becoming Minister for Foreign Affairs 1914–1917, and member of the Riksdags first chamber (Parliament of Sweden) 1907–1919. In 1916, new legislation made it more difficult for banks to own shares in industrial companies on a long-term basis. Investor was formed as an investment part of Stockholms Enskilda Bank.

Knut Agathon Wallenberg's younger brother Marcus Wallenberg (senior) carried on the tradition and took over as the bank's CEO in 1911, replacing his older brother who was appointed Stockholms Enskilda Bank chairman of the board.

=== Third generation ===
Jacob Wallenberg, eldest son of Marcus Wallenberg (senior), became the bank's CEO after Joseph Nachmanson sv died in 1927, joined by younger brother Marcus Wallenberg (junior) as the bank's deputy CEO. In 1938, Knut Agathon Wallenberg died. He had no children. Marcus Wallenberg (senior) was appointed Stockholms Enskilda Bank chairman of the board.

During the World War II the Bank collaborated with Nazi Germany. The Secretary of the US Treasury, Henry Morgenthau Jr. considered Jacob Wallenberg strongly pro-German, and the US subjected the Bank to a blockade that was only lifted in 1947.

=== Fourth generation ===
The fourth generation of Wallenbergs joined the family business in 1953, including heir apparent Marc Wallenberg, eldest son of Marcus Wallenberg (junior), who became a deputy CEO at Stockholms Enskilda Bank in 1953, before taking over as CEO in 1958. After a power struggle between Jacob Wallenberg and his younger brother Marcus Wallenberg (junior), Jacob Wallenberg resigned from the board of directors in 1969.

The resignation opened a seat on the bank's board of directors to Peter Wallenberg (senior), younger son of Marcus Wallenberg (junior). Marcus Wallenberg (junior) pushed through a merger agreement between Stockholms Enskilda Bank and rival Skandinaviska Banken in 1971. Soon after, tragedy struck when Marc Wallenberg committed suicide, observers suggested that the act came possibly because Marc Wallenberg felt himself inadequate to the task of leading what was to become the Scandinavia banking giant Skandinaviska Enskilda Banken. The merger went through in 1972.

Marcus Wallenberg (junior), and younger son Peter Wallenberg (senior), focused their interests on the family's investment companies, Investor and Providentia. Investor now became the family's new flagship business, and, under Marcus Wallenberg (juniors) leadership began actively promoting the restructuring of most of the industrial companies under its control, replacing board members and promoting younger CEO and other management.

Peter Wallenberg (senior) took over after Marcus Wallenberg (junior's) death in 1982. For many outsiders, the change in leadership marked a final moment in the family's more than 100-year dominance of the Swedish banking and industrial sectors. Yet Peter Wallenberg (senior) rose to the challenge, guiding Investor and Sweden's industry into a new era. In 1990, it was estimated that the family indirectly controlled one-third of the Swedish Gross National Product. Peter Wallenberg (senior) stepped down from leadership of Investor in 1997.

=== Fifth generation ===
In 2006, the fifth generation took over the Wallenberg sphere. Marcus Wallenberg, son of Marc Wallenberg, Jacob Wallenberg and Peter Wallenberg (junior) both sons of Peter Wallenberg (senior).

=== Sixth generation ===
The sixth generation consists of approximately 30 members, all of them descended from Jacob, Peter or Marcus. Under the leadership of Jacob Wallenberg and Celia Pilkington, the Wallenberg’s have established a program allow this generation to learn more about the businesses’, foundations, values and history. In the latter half of 2025 As part of the plans for succession from the current ruling generation who are in their sixties, six members of the sixth generation joined what the Swedes term the Wallenbergsfären (“Wallenberg sphere”).

Every six weeks the ruling trio meets three members of the sixth generation in rotation and once a year in May the entire family meets in Stockholm.

== Modern business ==
The Wallenbergs have a very low-key public profile, eschewing conspicuous displays of wealth. The family motto is "Esse, non Videri" (Latin for "To be, rather than to seem") which was adopted by Marcus Wallenberg Sr in 1931. The Wallenberg's business empire is often referred to as the Wallenbergsfären (“Wallenberg sphere”), the Wallenberg sphere is a large group of companies where their investment company, Investor AB, or foundation asset management company, Foundation Asset Management (FAM), have the controlling interest.

While the family’s foundations only own 23% of the publicly owned Investor AB they effectively control just over 50% of its voting rights.

As of late 2025 they controlled 35% of the Swedish stock market down from the 40% they controlled in the 1970s.

== Foundations ==
The Wallenberg’s have established 16 non-profit public and private foundations, which are known collectively as the Wallenberg Foundations. The largest of these are the Knut and Alice Wallenberg Foundation (KAW), which was founded in 1917, the later established Marianne and Marcus Wallenberg Foundation, and the Marcus and Amalia Wallenberg Foundation. The endowment of these foundations has either been donated by members of the family, or it has been raised through collections to honour members of the family. The creation of these foundations allowed the family to avoid inheritance taxes and have been retained despite Sweden abolishing such taxes in the early 2000s.

In 2024 the Wallenberg foundation’s donated $300 million to various universities for education and research, which for that year made them the second largest such donor in Europe. As of 2026 the various foundations have awarded approximately to SEK 50 billion since 1917.

== Notable family members ==
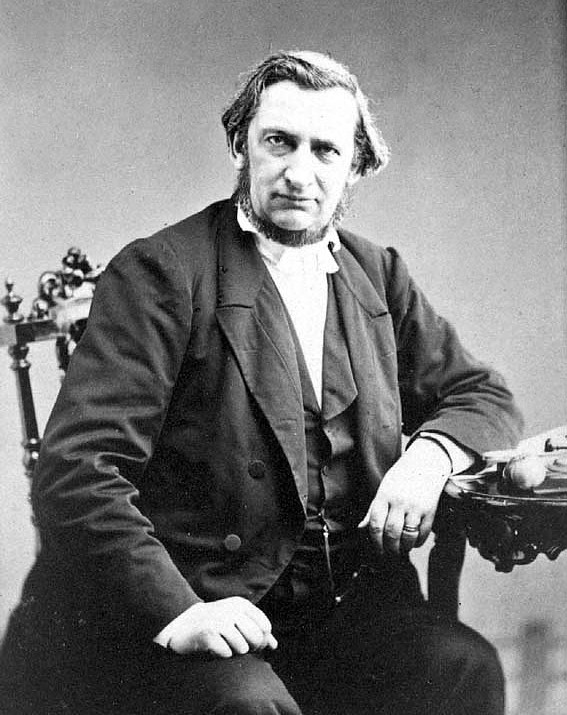
André Oscar Wallenberg (1816–1886)

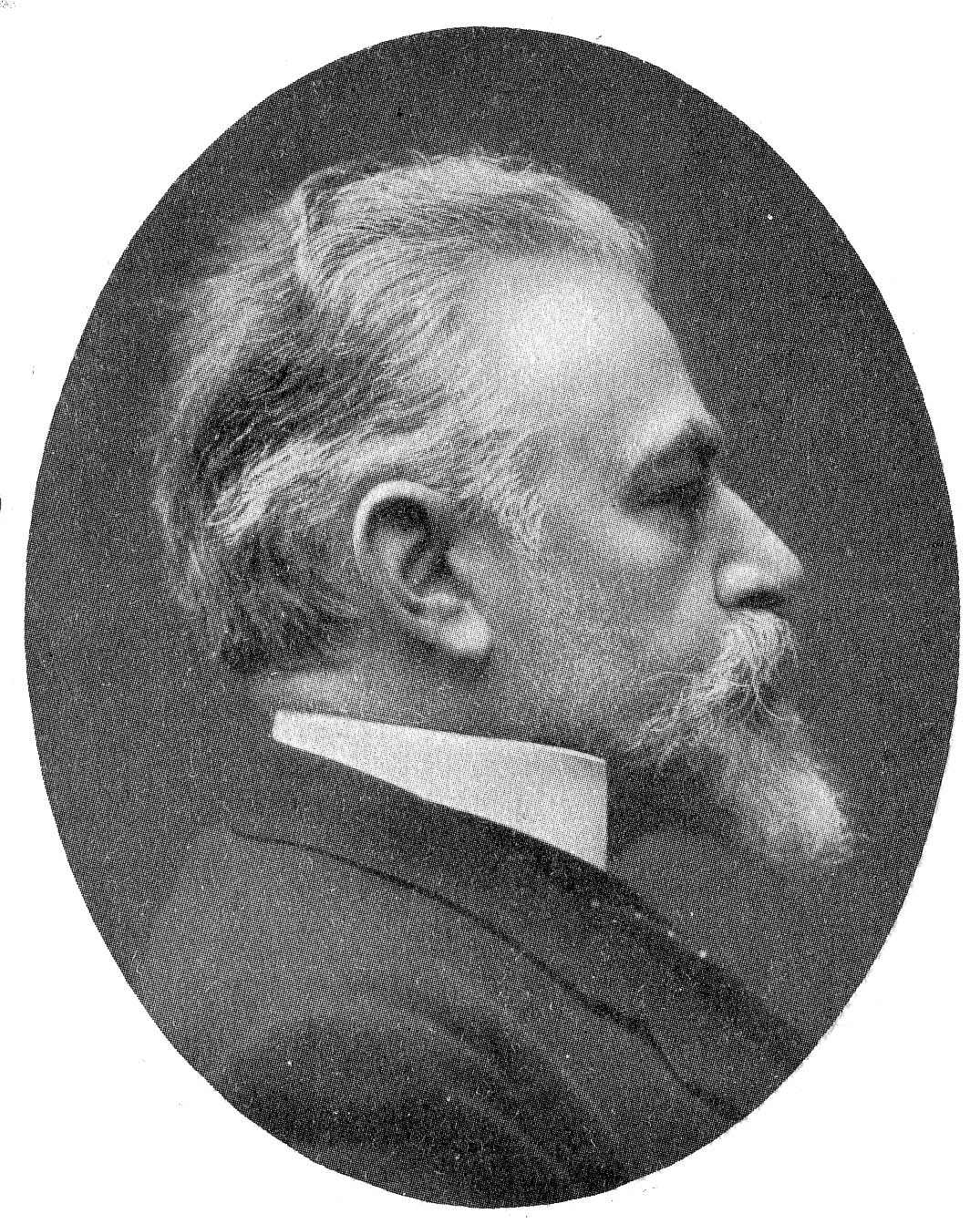
Knut Agathon Wallenberg (1853–1938)

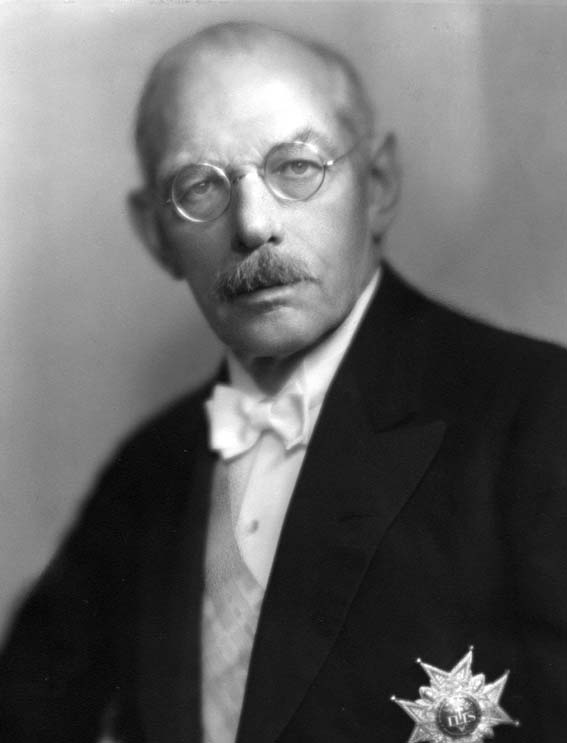
Marcus Wallenberg Sr. (1864–1943)

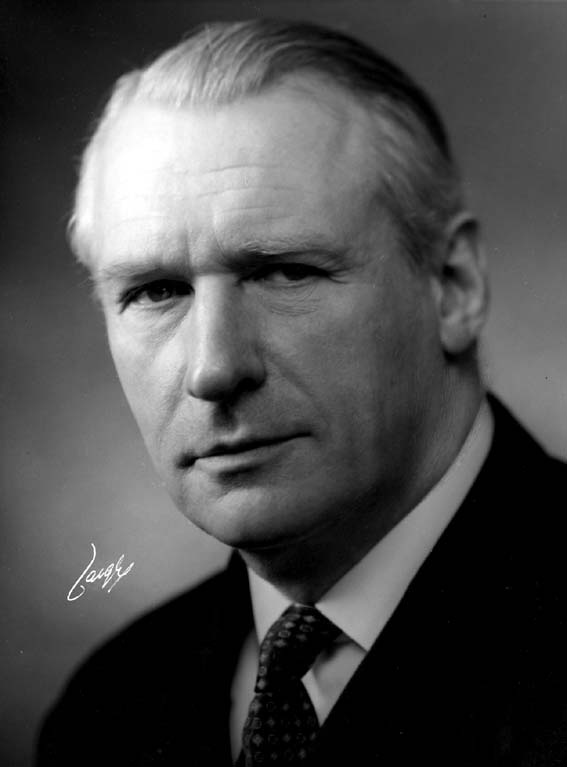
Jacob Wallenberg (1892–1980)

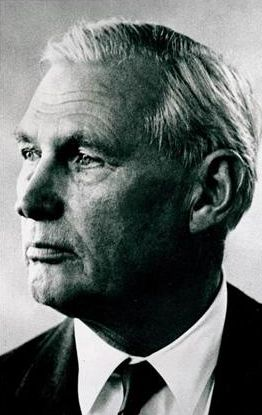
Marcus Wallenberg Jr. (1899–1982)

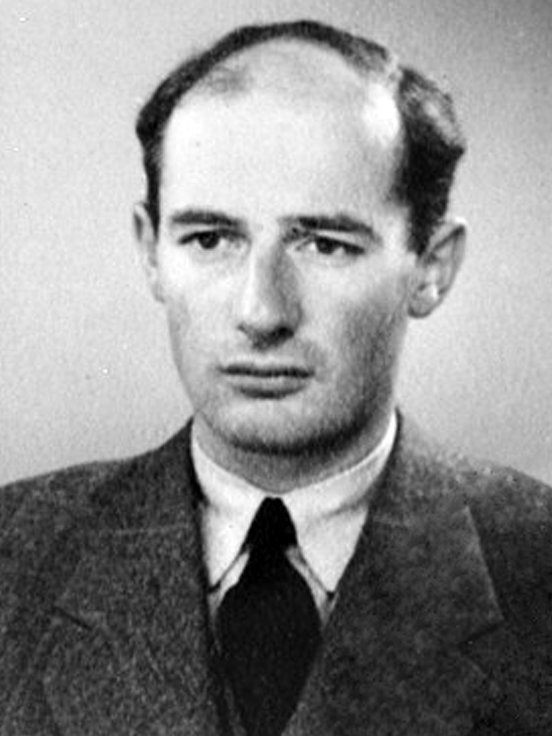
Raoul Wallenberg (1912–c.1947)

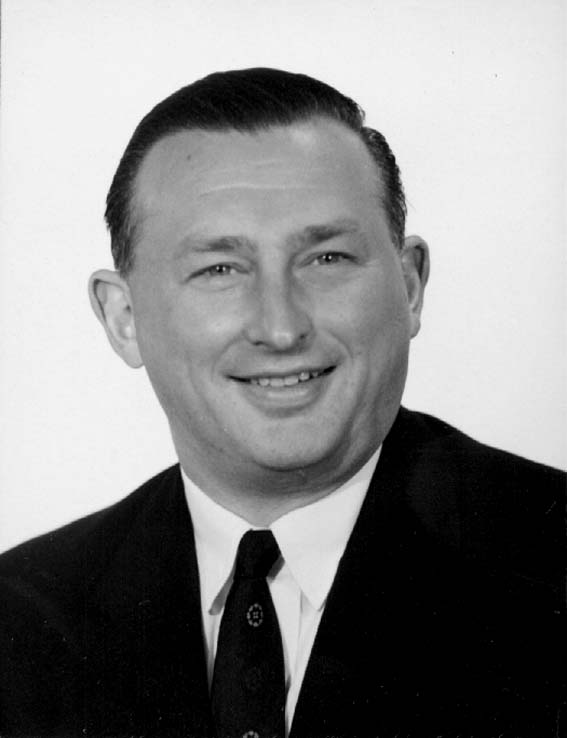
Marc Wallenberg (1924–1971)

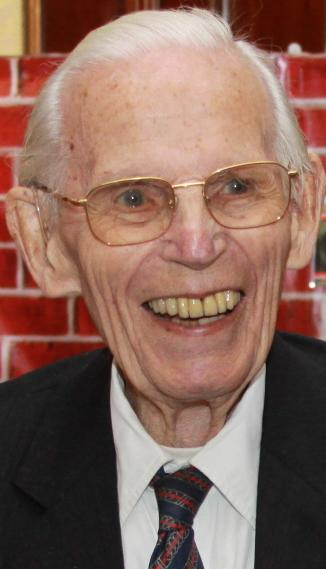
Peter Wallenberg Sr. (1926–2015)

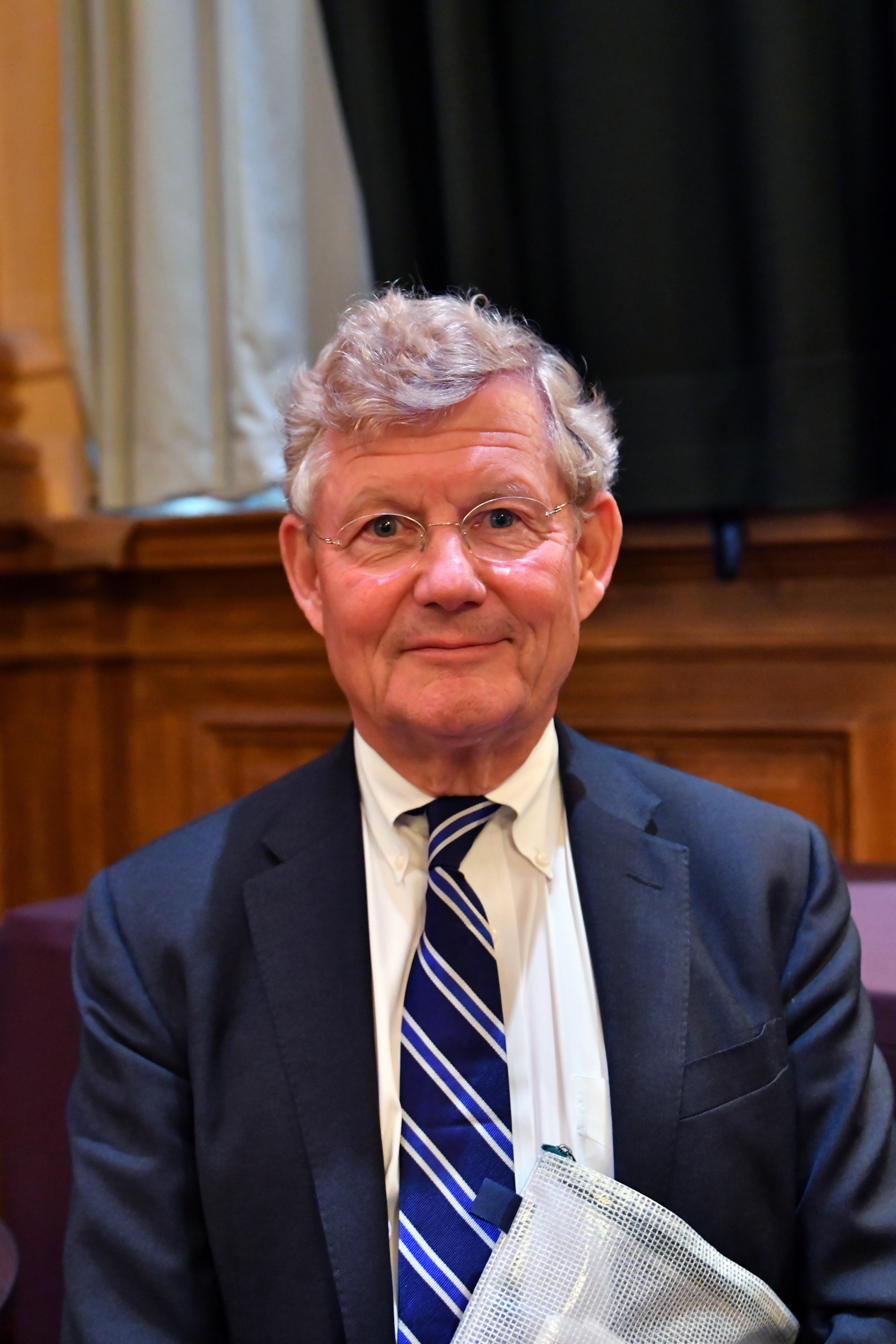
Jacob Wallenberg (1956–)

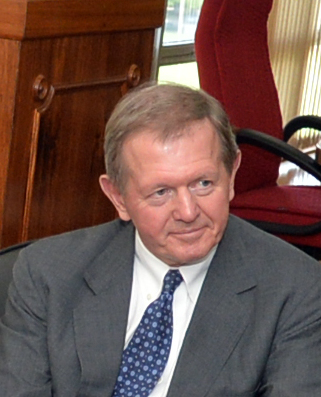
Marcus Wallenberg (1956–)

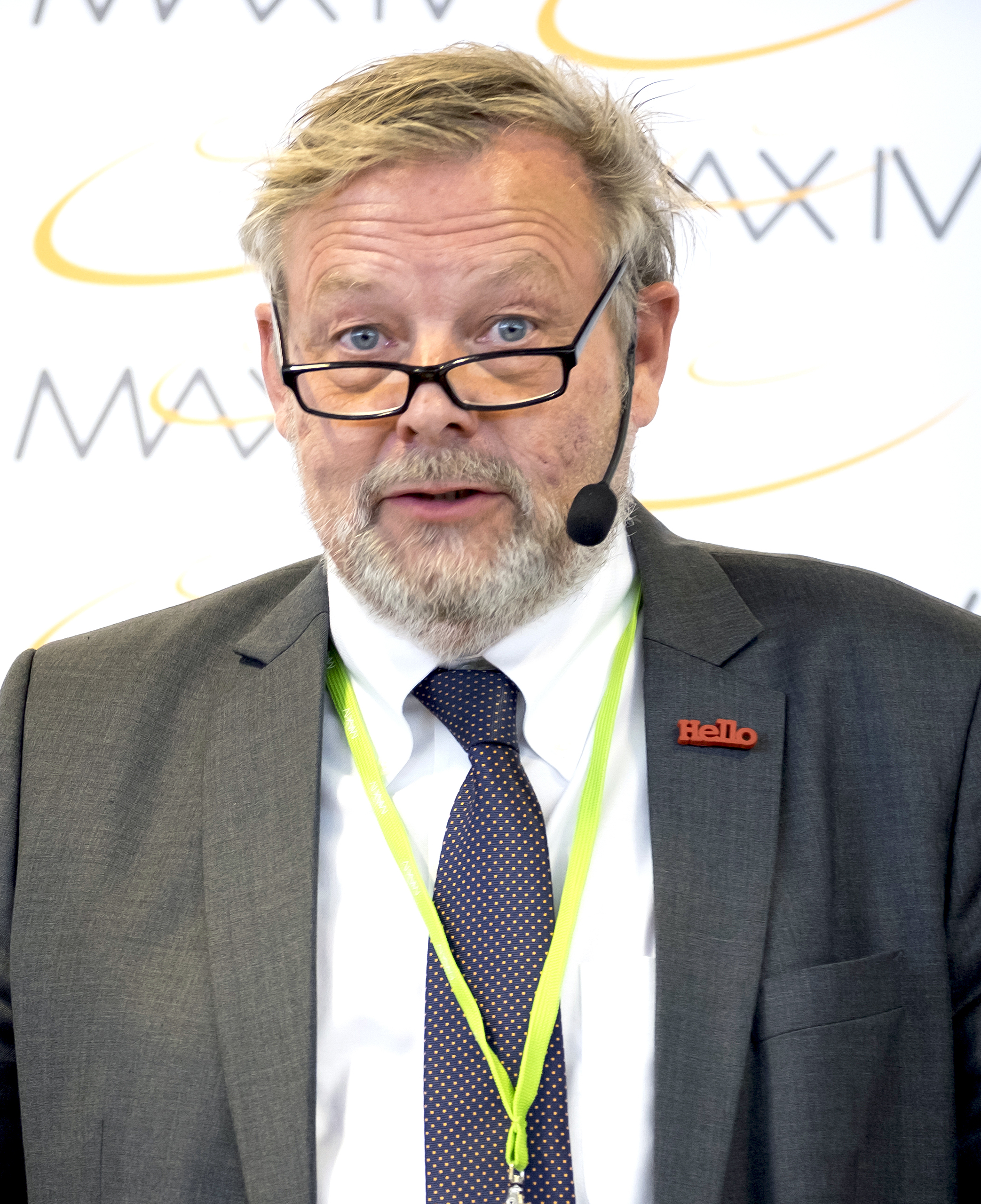
Peter Wallenberg Jr. (1959–)

== Bibliography ==
- Wetterberg, Gunnar (2014). Wallenberg: The Family that Shaped Sweden's Economy (Hardcover). Möklinta, Sweden: Gidlunds förlag. ISBN 978-9178448982.
