= Birth certificate =

Official record of the birth of a person

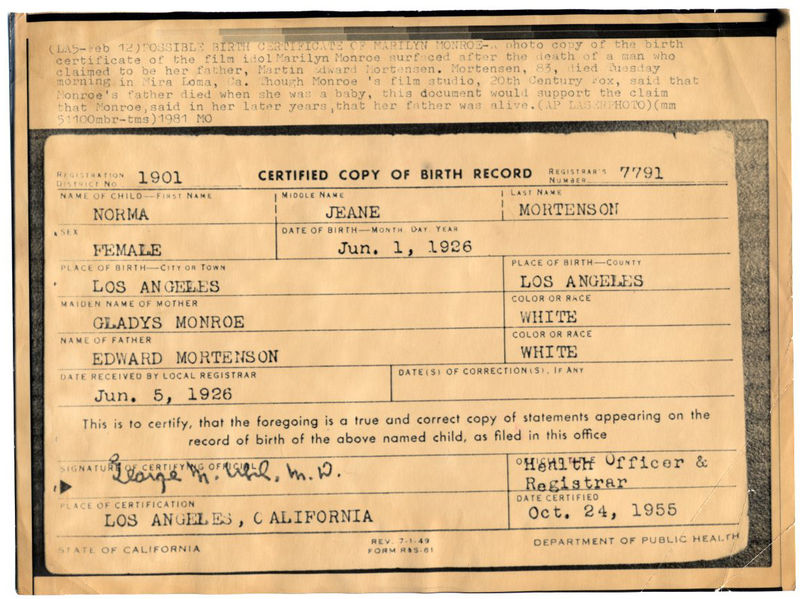
A 1955 legal document certifying the birth of Marilyn Monroe in 1926

A birth certificate is a vital record that documents the birth of a person. The term "birth certificate" can refer to either the original document certifying the circumstances of the birth or to a certified copy of or representation of the ensuing registration of that birth. Depending on the jurisdiction, a record of birth might or might not contain verification of the event by a healthcare professional such as a midwife or doctor.

The United Nations Sustainable Development Goal 17 of 2015, an integral part of the 2030 Agenda, has a target to increase the timely availability of data regarding age, gender, race, ethnicity, and other relevant characteristics which documents like a birth certificate have the capacity to provide.

== History and contemporary times ==
The documentation of births is a practice widely held throughout human civilization. The original purpose of vital statistics was for tax purposes and for the determination of available military manpower. In England, births were initially registered with churches, who maintained registers of births. This practice continued into the 19th century. The compulsory registration of births with the United Kingdom government is a practice that originated at least as far back as 1853. The entire United States did not get a standardized system until 1902.

Most countries have statutes and laws that regulate the registration of births. In all countries, it is the responsibility of the mother's physician, midwife, hospital administrator, or the parent(s) of the child to see that the birth is properly registered with the appropriate government agency.

The actual record of birth is stored with a government agency. That agency will issue certified copies or representations of the original birth record upon request, which can be used to apply for government benefits, such as passports. The certification is signed and/or sealed by the registrar or other custodian of birth records, who is commissioned by the government.

The right of every child to a name and nationality, and the responsibility of national governments to achieve this are contained in Articles 7 and 8 in the United Nations Convention on the Rights of the Child: "The child shall be registered immediately after birth and shall have the right from birth to a name, the right to acquire a nationality..." (CRC Article 7) and "States Parties undertake to respect the right of the child to preserve his or her identity, including nationality, name and family relations..." (CRC Article 8).

...it's a small paper but it actually establishes who you are and gives access to the rights and the privileges, and the obligations, of citizenship.

— Archbishop Desmond Tutu, February 2005

Despite 191 countries ratifying the convention, the births of millions of children worldwide go unregistered. By their very nature, data concerning unregistered children are approximate. About 29% of countries do not have available or sufficient data to assess global progress toward the SDG goal of universal coverage. However, from the data that is available, UNICEF estimates that more than a quarter of children under 5 worldwide are unregistered. The lowest levels of birth registration are found in sub-Saharan Africa (43 percent). This phenomenon disproportionately impacts poor households and indigenous populations. Even in many developed countries, it contributes to difficulties in fully accessing civic rights.

Birth registration opens the door to rights to children and adults which many other human beings take for granted: to prove their age; to prove their nationality; to receive healthcare; to go to school; to take exams; to be adopted; to protection from underage military service or conscription; to marry; to open a bank account; to hold a driving licence; to obtain a passport; to inherit money or property; and to vote or stand for elected office.

There are many reasons why births go unregistered, including social and cultural beliefs and attitudes; alternative documents and naming ceremonies; remote areas, poor infrastructure; economic barriers; lack of office staff, equipment and training; legal and political restrictions; fear of discrimination and persecution; war, conflict and unrest or simply the fact that there is no system in place.

Retrospective registration may be necessary where there is a backlog of children whose births have gone unregistered. In Senegal, the government is facilitating retrospective registration through free local court hearings and the number of unregistered children has fallen considerably as a result. In Sierra Leone, the government gave the National Office of Births and Deaths special permission to issue birth certificates to children over seven. In Bolivia, there was a successful three-year amnesty for the free registration of young people aged between 12 and 18.

Statelessness, or the lack of effective nationality, impacts the daily lives of some 11–12 million people around the world. Perhaps those who suffer most are stateless infants, children, and adolescents. Although born and raised in their parents' country of habitual residence, they lack formal recognition of their existence.

In some cases birth certificates can be fraudulent.

== Algeria ==
The establishment of the first birth certificates in Algeria dates from the 1830s, during the French colonial era. Full copies are issued only by the commune of birth. However, birth certificates can be issued by any municipality or consulate on presentation of a family record book and are valid for 10 years.

In 2020, the government launched an online service for requesting civil status documents.

The secure birth certificate, known as 12S (in Arabic: 12خ), is an extract of birth certificate issued once in a lifetime on a special and secured paper, this document is mandatory for the issuance of the biometric ID and passport.

== Australia ==
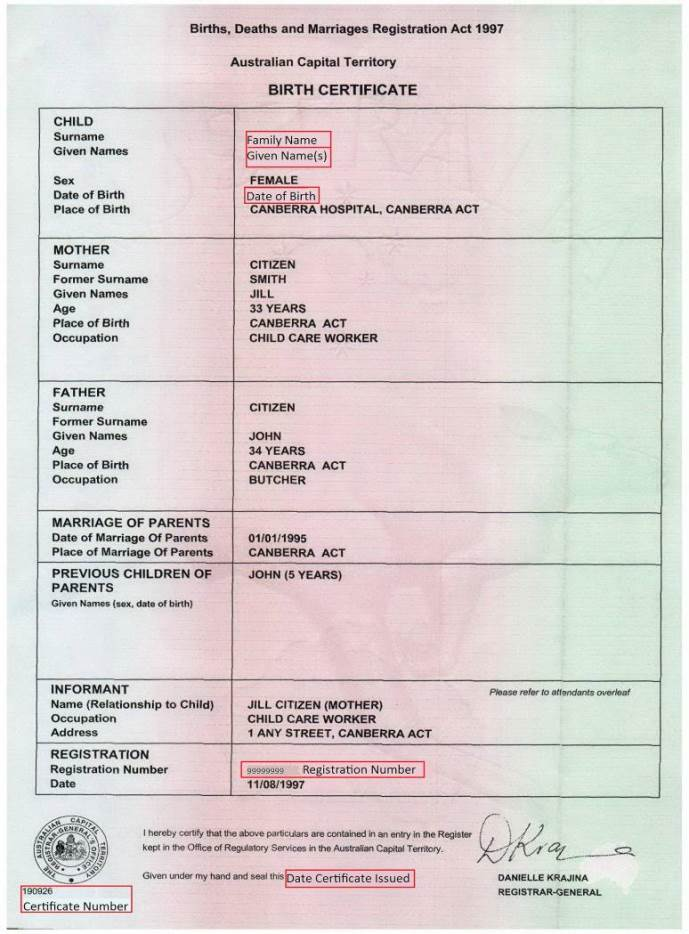
An Australian Capital Territory birth certificate

States and territories of Australia are responsible for the issuance of birth certificates, through agencies generally titled "Registry of Births Deaths and Marriages" or similar.

Initially registering a birth is done by a hospital through a "Birth Registration Statement" or similar, signed by appropriately licensed and authorized health professionals, and provided to the state or territory registry. Home births are permitted, but a statement is required from a registered midwife, doctor or 2 other witnesses other than the parent(s). Unplanned births require in some states that the baby be taken to a hospital within 24 hours. Once registered, a separate application (sometimes it can be done along with the Birth Registration Statement) can be made for a birth certificate, generally at a cost. The person(s) named or the parent(s) can apply for a certificate at any time. Generally, there is no restriction on re-applying for a certificate at a later date, so it could be possible to legally hold multiple original copies.

The Federal government requires that births be also registered through a "Proof of Birth Declaration" similarly signed as above by a doctor or midwife. This ensures the appropriate benefits can be paid, and the child is enrolled for Medicare.

The state or territory issued birth certificate is a secure A4 paper document, generally listing: Full name at birth, sex at birth, parent(s) and occupation(s), older sibling(s), address(es), date and place of birth, name of the registrar, date of registration, date of issue of certificate, a registration number, with the signature of the registrar and seal of the registry printed and/or embossed. Most states allow for stillbirths to be issued a birth certificate. Some states issue early pregnancy loss certificates (without legal significance if before 20 weeks). Depending on the state or territory, amendments on the certificate are allowed to correct an entry, add ascendant, recognize same-sex relationship, changing the sex of the holder is possible in all states and territories.

The full birth certificate in Australia is an officially recognized identity document generally in the highest category. The birth certificate assists in establishing citizenship. Shorter and/or commemorative birth certificates are available; however, they are not generally acceptable for identification purposes.

Birth certificates in Australia can be verified online by approved agencies through the Attorney-General's Department Document Verification Service and can be used to validate identity digitally, e.g. online.

== Canada ==
In Canada, the issuance of birth certificates is a function of the provinces and territories. In 2008, provinces and territories started rolling out new polymer certificates to new applicants.

Canadian birth certificates may be obtained from the following:

- Alberta – A registry agent authorised by the Province
- British Columbia – British Columbia Vital Statistics Agency
- Manitoba – Manitoba Vital Statistics Agency
- New Brunswick – Service New Brunswick
- Newfoundland and Labrador – Service NL
- Northwest Territories – Health Services Administration Office
- Nova Scotia – Access Nova Scotia
- Nunavut – Registrar-General of Vital Statistics
- Ontario – ServiceOntario
- Prince Edward Island – Vital Statistics Registry
- Quebec – Director of Civil Status (Directeur de l'état civil)
- Saskatchewan – eHealth Saskatchewan
- Yukon – Vital Statistics, Government of Yukon

=== Types issued ===
There are three forms of birth certificates issued:

- Certified true copy/photostat – contains all information available on the birth of a person.
- Long-form – contains name, place and date of birth, parental information, date of issue, date of registration, registration number, certificate number, and authorised signature(s).
- Short-form – as with long-form, except for parental information. Previously in card format.

Residents of Quebec born elsewhere can have their non-Quebec birth record inserted into Quebec's birth register. Quebec birth certificates issued with regard to a birth that occurred outside of Quebec are referred to as "semi-authentic" under paragraph 137 of the Civil Code of Québec, until their full authenticity is recognised by a Quebec court. Inserting one's birth record into the Quebec register is a prerequisite for anyone born outside of Quebec to apply for a legal name and/or legal gender change in the province. Semi-authentic birth certificates are issued in the long-form only.

=== Languages ===
Depending on the province, certificates are in English, French or both languages. Birth certificates from Canadian territories are in English and French, as well as Inuktitut in Nunavut (though individual data is in the Roman alphabet only, not in Inuktitut syllabics). The Northwest Territories previously issued certificates bearing Inuktitut.

=== DND 419 birth certificates ===
In 1963, the Department of National Defence started issuing birth certificates to dependents of Canadian Forces members born overseas. These certificates were never accorded legal status, but served as a convenient substitute for the original record of birth from the country of birth. In November 1979, production of these certificates ceased.

Today, the DND 419 is recognised as a proof of age, but not of citizenship. At least two Canadians have had Canadian passports withheld on the basis of their DND 419 birth certificates.

== China ==
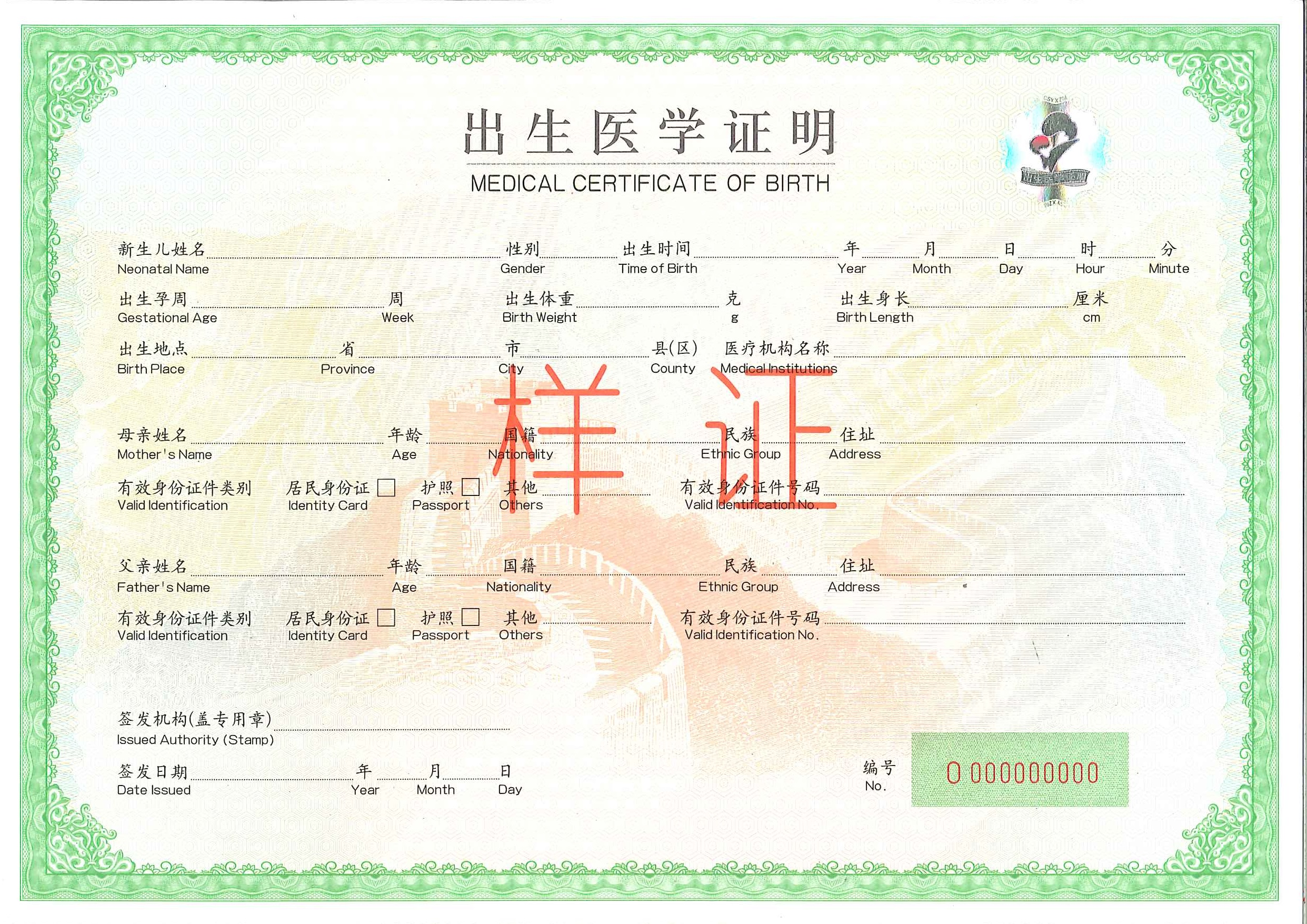
Specimen of China's Medical Certificate of Birth (Fifth Edition/2014–2019)

The People's Republic of China started to issue the medical certificate of birth on 1 January 1996 (1 March 1996 in remote areas). The second edition came into use on 1 January 2000; the third edition on 1 January 2003; the fourth edition on 1 December 2004; the fifth edition on 1 January 2014; the sixth edition on 1 January 2019; and the seventh edition on 1 April 2023.

Persons born in China prior to 1996 may obtain a notarial certificate of birth from a Chinese notary public by way of presenting their household registration (hukou) and other supporting documents. The notary then proceeds to issue a notarial certificate of birth based on the information contained in the said documentation. This notarial birth certificate is acceptable for immigration purposes.

== Cuba ==
In Cuba, birth certificates are issued by the local civil registries.

With the passage of Extraordinary Official Gazette Number 9 of 2020, issued by the Cuban Ministry of Justice, birth certificates (as with all other vital records, excepting certificates of single status) will no longer expire after a certain amount of time.

Children born to Cuban citizens abroad may have the details of their birth transcribed in a Cuban civil registry through a Cuban overseas mission. This is known as a Birth Certificate Transcript. Because of the considerable difficulty of obtaining Cuban vital records for individuals residing outside of Cuba – even where Cuban overseas missions have been delegated to provide these services – private services such as the Massachusetts-based Cuba City Hall offer retrieval services, wherein they apply for a certificate from a Cuban civil registry on behalf of an overseas individual. These services have been called overpriced.

== Czech Republic ==
The Czech Republic maintains a registry of vital records, including births, of people, regardless of nationality, or birthplace. Every citizen of the Czech Republic will need to register their birth if born abroad, effectively granting a foreign born person two birth certificates. The Czech Republic will also register foreigners in some cases. The office that registers births is colloquially called 'matrika'.

== Denmark ==
In Denmark, the authority responsible for registering births is the Registrar of the Church of Denmark.

There are three types of Danish birth certificates:

- Personattest (Certificate of Personal Data): issued to persons born in (or baptised in) Denmark.
- Foedsels- og Daabsattest (Birth and Baptism Certificate): issued to persons born in Denmark and baptised in the Church of Denmark.
- Foedsels- og Navneattest (Birth and Naming Certificate): issued to persons born in Denmark but not baptised in the Church of Denmark.

== France ==
Civil records in France have been compulsory since the 1539 ordinance of Villers-Cotterêts, in which the King Francis I ordered the parishes to record baptisms, marriages and sepultures. Then in 1667 the parishes were asked to issue two registers in two different places in order to avoid the loss of data. Jews and Protestants were allowed to have their own records by Louis XVI in 1787. In 1792, the registers were fully secularized (birth, civil marriage and death replaced baptism, religious marriage and sepulture, plus an official kept the records instead of a priest), and the Code civil did create the compulsory birth certificate in 1804 (in its articles 34, 38, 39 et 57). This document should be completed at one's marriage since 1897, at one's divorce since 1939, at one's death since 1945 and at one's civil union since 2006. A note is added on the certificate for all these events.

== Hong Kong ==
In Hong Kong, the system is similar to England and Wales, wherein the government keeps a birth register book, and the birth certificate is actually a certified copy of the birth register book entry.

Currently, the Immigration Department is the official birth registrar. All parents need to register their children's birth within 42 days. Birth certificates issued between 1 July 1997 and 27 April 2008 recorded whether or not the child's Hong Kong permanent resident status was established at birth. Birth certificates issued after the latter date record which provision of the Immigration Ordinance the said status has been established under.

== India ==
Traditionally births were poorly recorded in India.

For official purposes, other proofs are accepted in India in lieu of the birth certificate, such as matriculation certificates. Facilities are available to produce a birth certificate from a passport.

By law since 1969, registration of births is compulsory as per provisions of Registration of Births & Deaths Act. Birth certificates are issued by the Government of India or the municipality concerned. Specific rules vary by state, region and municipality.

In Delhi, for example, births must be registered within 21 days by the hospital or institution, or by a family member if the birth has taken place at home. After registration, a birth certificate can be obtained by applying to the relevant authority. Certificates can also be issued under special provisions to adopted children, and undocumented orphans. Overseas births can also be registered.

Some municipalities, such as the Greater Chennai Corporation, allow for fully digital birth certificates to be applied for, printed, and verified online. Detailed procedural guidance on name correction in birth certificates in Delhi is available through independent legal information portals.

== Indonesia ==
The current legislation governing the registration of births is the 2006 Act No 23 on the Administration of Civil Status (UU No. 23 Tahun 2006 tentang Administrasi Kependudukan), as amended by 2013 Act No 24 on Amendments to 2006 Act No 23.

=== Births outside Indonesia ===
Pursuant to Chapter 29 of the Act, Indonesian citizens born overseas must register their births with the local civil registrar using a foreign birth certificate upon returning to Indonesia, and receive a Report of Birth Abroad (Tanda Bukti Laporan Kelahiran). If born in a jurisdiction which does not register the births of non-citizens, they will instead be issued a regular Birth Certificate by the local Indonesian overseas mission.

=== Births within Indonesia ===
Within Indonesia, local civil registrars are responsible for issuing birth certificates (akta kelahiran).

The following Staatsbladen (state gazettes), enacted by the Dutch colonial government, were supplanted by the Act:

- 1849 Staatsblad 25 for persons of European descent
- 1917 Staatsblad 130 for persons of Chinese descent
- 1920 Staatsblad 751 for persons of Indigenous descent
- 1923 Staatsblad 75 for persons of Indigenous descent professing the Christian faith

Prior to 1986, persons not born in any of the above groups had to be registered through court order. This changed by a 1986 decree of the Minister of Home Affairs, resulting in a jolt in the number of births being registered. In 1989, a subsequent decree was effected by the Minister, allowing those born between 1986 and 1989 to have their births registered.

There are several types of birth certificates issued to Indonesian-born individuals, per the Denpasar Civil Registry:

- General Birth Certificate (Akta Kelahiran Umum)
- Delayed Birth Certificate (Akta Kelahiran Terlambat)
- Birth Certificate for a Child Born to a Single Mother (Akta Kelahiran Anak Seorang Ibu)

Pursuant to the Act's domicile principle, a birth certificate is issued by the Civil Registry of the parents' home regency or city, as determined from their Indonesian identity card. This is not always the same place as the actual regency or city of birth of the child.

There is no such thing as a certified copy of the original birth registration form; all Indonesian birth certificates are abstracts in nature and list an individual's nationality, name, place and date of birth, birth order, parents' names and marital status only. Indonesian birth certificates are typically laminated like Malaysian and Singaporean ones; however, unlike Malaysia and Singapore, it is not done at the time of issuance by the civil registry. The Indonesian government recommends against lamination, as it may render the certificate unacceptable for use overseas (laminated certificates cannot be legalised).

In 2019, Indonesian local civil registrars began to issue birth certificates with QR codes in lieu of the traditional authenticating signature and stamp. Widodo, director of civil registry services for the Bengkulu Civil Registry, is quoted as saying that "this is by decree of the Minister of Home Affairs, and will help simplify things for the general public as they will no longer be required to go through the hassle of getting [birth certificates] legalised." In July 2020, Indonesia phased out birth certificates printed on security paper, and started allowing Indonesian-born people to print out their own birth certificates on regular A4 paper; these certificates have the same legal value as birth certificates printed on security paper. The move reportedly helped the central government save 450 billion rupiahs in the 2020 fiscal year.

== Iran ==
A shenasnameh (شناسنامه), or birth certificate is issued by the National Organization for Civil Registration. It includes the name and surname of the infant, place and date of birth, gender, information relating to the parents including their names and residences, and the "registration documentation (witness or physician's certificate). A newer format was introduced in 2015. Those eligible to replication include newborn babies, people who are changing their names, those who have lost their original birth certificates, and those born before 2001 who have reached the age of 15 and need to change their cards to add the photograph. Those applying for a new certificate must show their old certificate.

== Japan ==
In Japan, the household registration document (jp: 戸籍, koseki) is generally used in lieu of a birth certificate.

Since a koseki also acts as proof of Japanese citizenship, only Japanese citizens can hold one. Anyone born in Japan, including children born to non-Japanese parents, can obtain a Certificate of Matters Stated In a Written Notification (jp: 出生届記載事項証明書, shusshō todoke kisai jikō shōmeisho). A Certificate of Matters Stated In a Written Notification may be obtained from the city/ward/town office the birth was reported to, and is the equivalent of a birth certificate. This is to be distinguished from a Certificate of Acceptance of Birth Notification (jp: 出生届受理証明書, shusshō todoke juri shōmeisho), which, according to the Australian Embassy at Tokyo, only constitutes a receipt proving that a birth registration has been lodged with a city/ward/town office.

Birth records for children born to non-Japanese parents in Japan are not maintained permanently; usually only for the duration of ten years from the date of lodgement, but this varies from one city/ward/town office to another.

== Malaysia ==
In Malaysia, the National Registration Department (Jabatan Pendaftaran Negara) is responsible for the registration of births, and for issuing birth certificates (sijil kelahiran).

In 2011, the department started colour-coding birth certificates. Henceforth, citizens at birth would receive a pale-green birth certificate, while those who do not acquire Malaysian citizenship at birth would be given a red birth certificate. Then-director Datin Jariah Mohd Said was reported as saying that "it [would] address the wrong impression among foreign parents that their children automatically become Malaysians by virtue of them having the pale green certificate."

Malaysian birth certificates are laminated at the time of issuance, forming an exception to most countries' need for an unlaminated document (e.g. the United Kingdom when applying for a passport).

== Morocco ==
In Morocco, there are 3 birth documents: the "Extrait d'acte de naissance" (proof of Moroccan citizenship), a "Fiche individuelle de naissance" and an "Acte de naissance". All of them are valid for 3 months. In 2017, the government opened requests for birth certificates online.

== New Zealand ==
The Department of Internal Affairs is responsible for issuing birth certificates in New Zealand. Certain historical records including historical birth certificates are available online in a searchable format on the Birth, Death and Marriage Historical Records website. The available records are for births recorded at least one hundred years ago.

Citizenship information is recorded on New Zealand birth certificates for births after 1 January 2006, as this was when the country formally ended its practice of jus soli.

== Nigeria ==
The birth certificate in Nigeria is a document that entails the date of birth, location (Town, L.G.A and state) and details of the parents. It is issued by the National Population Commission for every child and is usually issued at the hospital where the child is born and it is compulsory for everyone. The National Population Commission (NPC) formed in 1992, is the only body responsible for registering births, and issuing certificates in the country.

For those who were not issued a certificate at birth, it is possible to apply for one up until their 18th birthday. However, only people aged 18 and below are issued a birth certificate. People above age 18 are issued an 'Age Declaration Affidavit'. Although now in Nigeria, you will have to provide an attestation letter issued by the NPC as the 'Age Declaration Affidavit' is no longer a sufficient document.

An attestation letter is a written document given as backup for the 'Age Declaration Affidavit'.

However, in terms of legal value and effect, the attestation of a birth certificate is equal to a birth certificate. The NPC Act states that only people born after 1992 are eligible to apply for birth certificate since that was when the NPC was formed. Also only birth certificate issued at birth or 60 days after birth is free any scenario after birth would require you to pay.

== Philippines ==
A birth certificate in the Philippines is a document issued by the Philippine Statistics Authority and has lifetime validity. In almost all cases, this document is required by other government agencies as a primary requirement for getting service or benefits.

== Poland ==
Birth records are created and kept by the registry office [Urząd stanu cywilnego (USC)] where the birth took place, records are regulated by Prawo o aktach stanu cywilnego (ustawa 2014).

From 2015 to 2024, birth records were computerized in SRP (System Rejestrów Państwowych).

=== Types of certified copies ===
- Complete (long) format certificates are copies of the original entry in the birth register, giving all the recorded details. Information includes: first name, second name, additional names, surname, sex, date, place, and country of birth of the child, parents': names, surnames and family name, date and place of birth.
- Short format certificates show the child's full first name, second name, additional names, surname, sex, date, place, and country of birth, parents': names, and family name.
- Multilingual short format certificates, according to ICCS Convention (No.16) on the issue of multilingual extracts from civil-status records. Information includes: country, date and place of birth, name, forename, sex, parents': names and forenames.
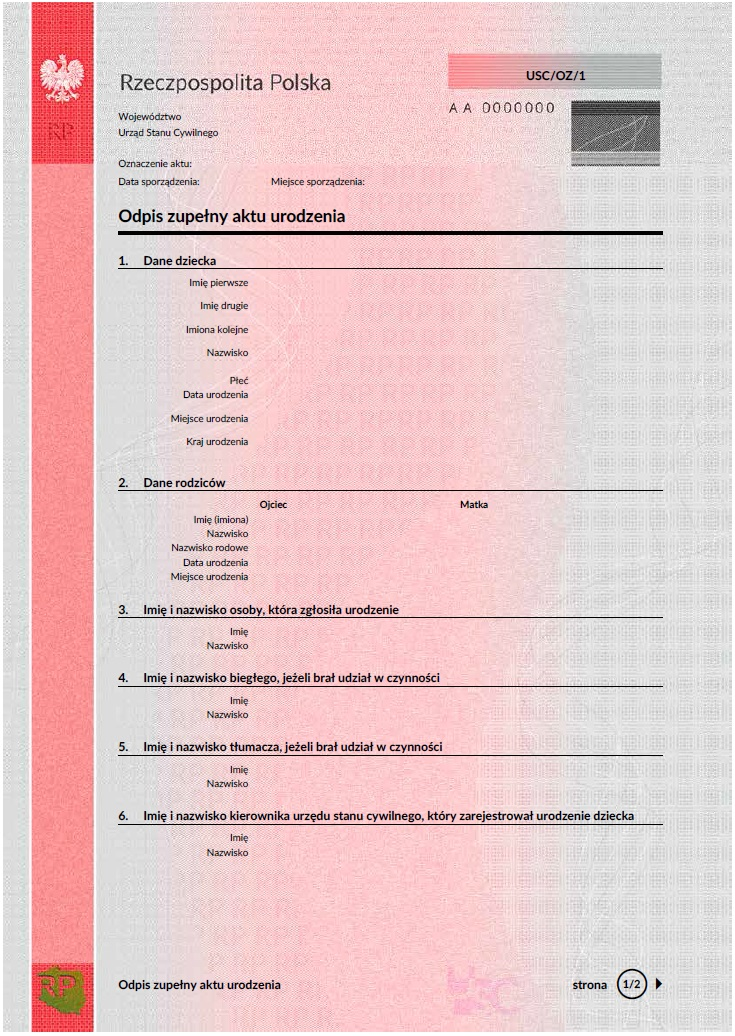
A long-form birth certificate (page 1)

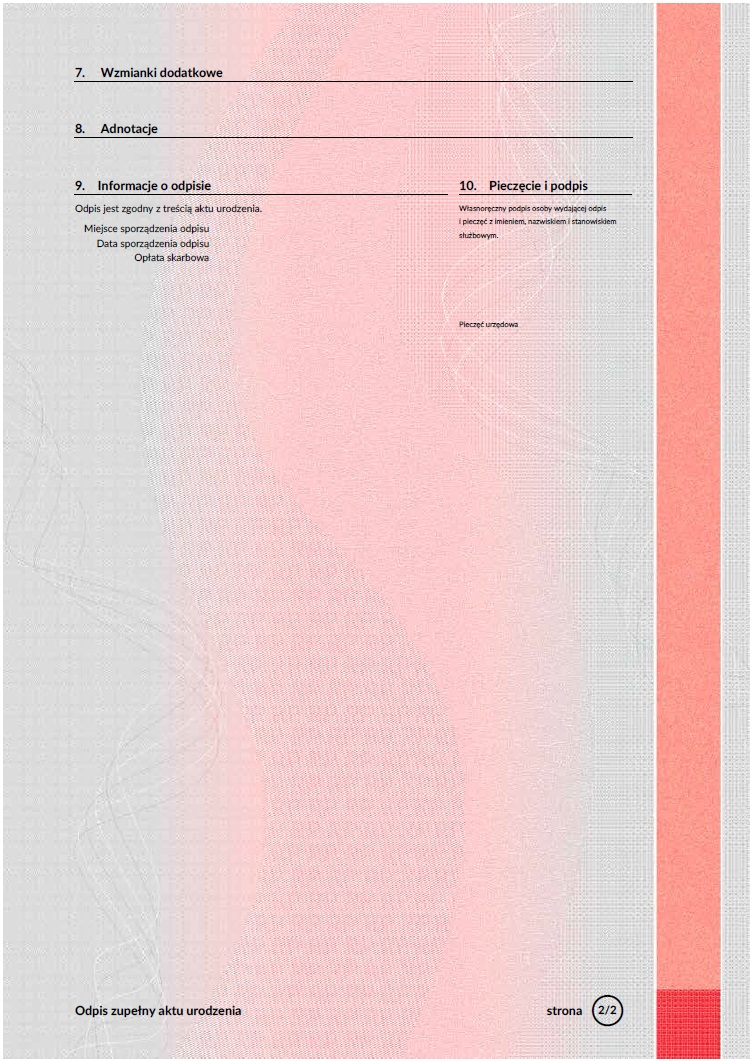
A long-form birth certificate (page 2)

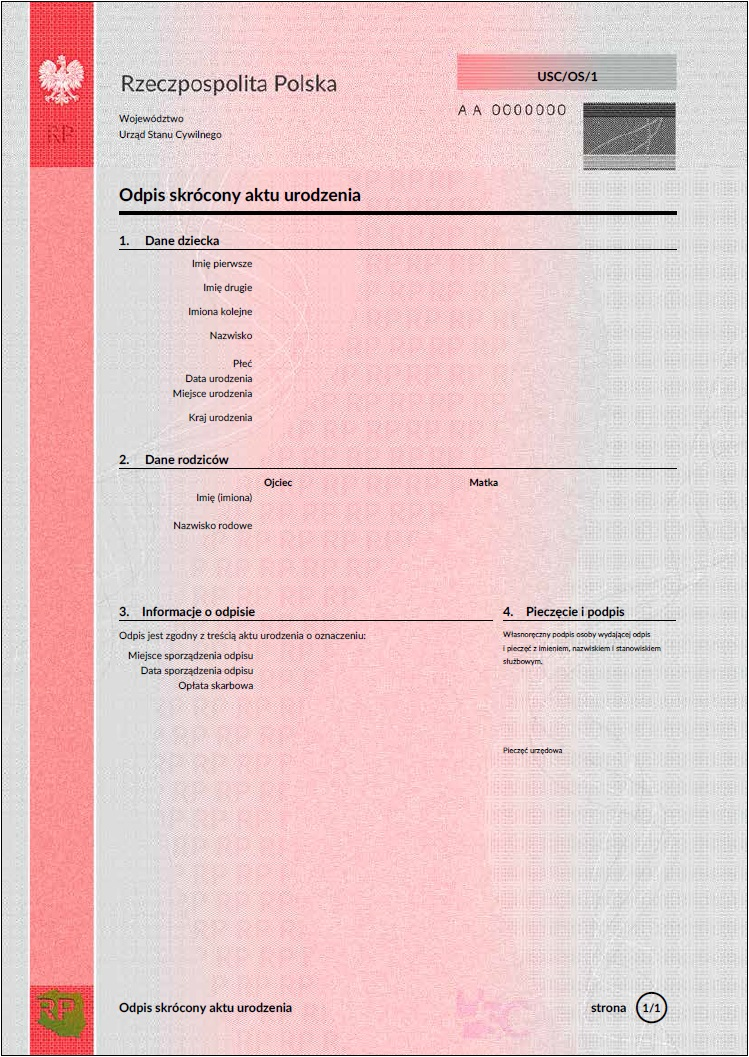
A short-form birth certificate

== Russia ==
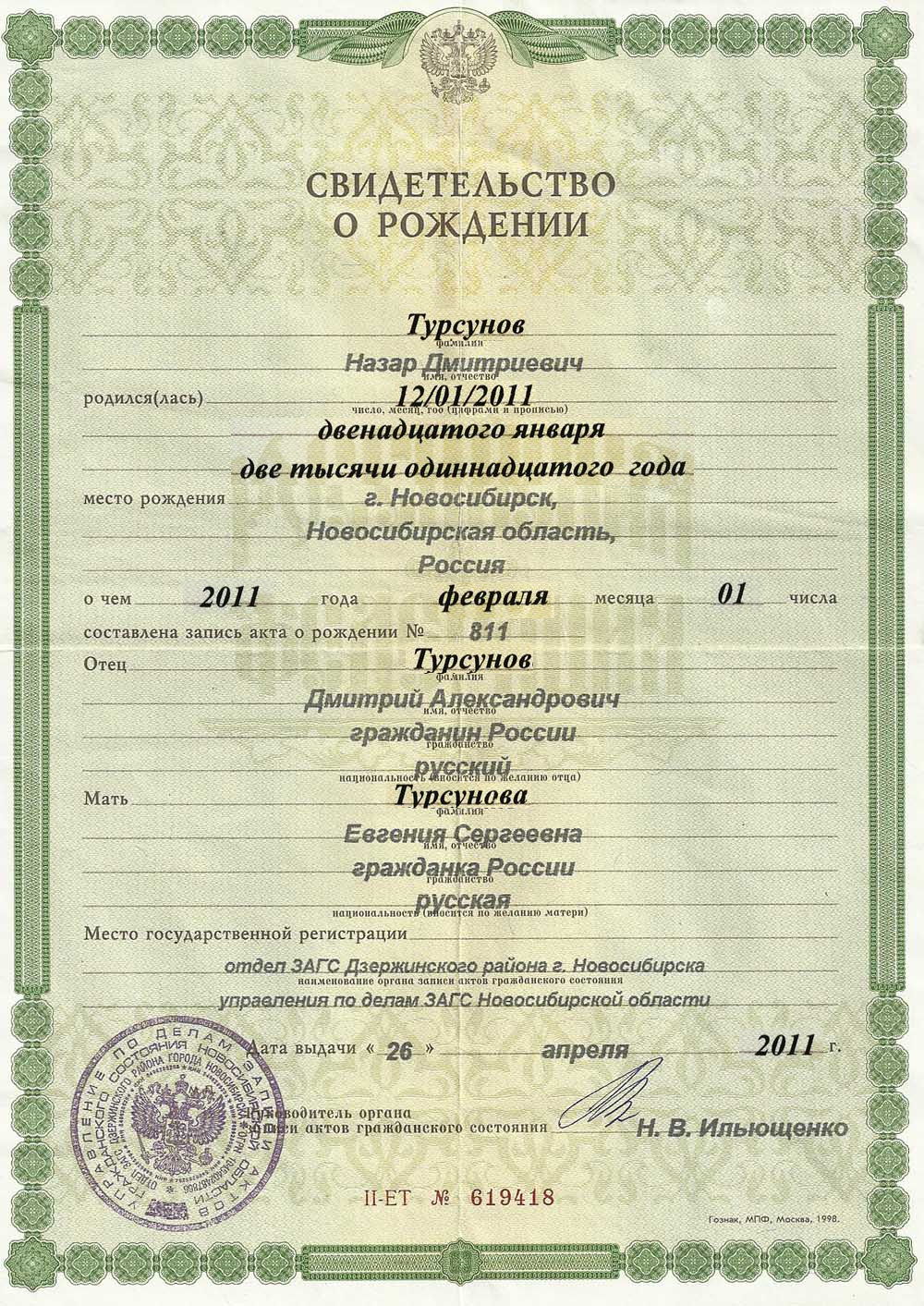
A Russian birth certificate

Russian birth certificates were previously issued in a booklet format, similar to that of internal passports; today, they are issued on numbered and watermarked A4 security paper. They are typically issued in the Russian language only; however, if a birth is recorded in one of the Russian republics with federal subject status, the resulting birth certificate may be bilingual (Russian and the official language of the said republic).

=== Filling a birth certificate ===
A Russian birth certificate may either be filled out in type or print. It is then signed and sealed by a qualified officer of the public authority issuing the certificate (a local civil registry or Russian overseas mission). By default, information on the parents' ethnic origins is no longer recorded – however, it may be recorded upon request.

=== Obtaining a birth certificate ===
A Russian birth certificate may be applied for by the person named on the certificate if they are of full age, their parents if still vested with parental rights, their guardian(s) and/or caregiver(s). If the certificate is lost, the public authority that issued the original document issues a replacement on application.

== Singapore ==
In Singapore, the Immigration and Checkpoints Authority is the registrar of births. All births in the country must be registered at a gazetted birth registration centre by the parents or by authorised proxy. A Certificate of Registration of Birth is received after the registration of birth; a Certificate of Extract from Register of Births is issued for all subsequent requests for birth certificates.

The ICA annotates birth certificates with citizenship information; a child born without a claim to Singapore citizenship will have a remark on their birth certificate stating "this child is not a citizen of Singapore at the time of birth". Conversely, a child born with a claim to Singapore citizenship will have "this child is a citizen of Singapore at the time of birth" on theirs.

Singaporean birth certificates are laminated at the time of issuance, forming an exception to most foreign countries' need for an unlaminated document (e.g. the United Kingdom when applying for a passport). This practice began on 1 January 1967.

== Somalia ==
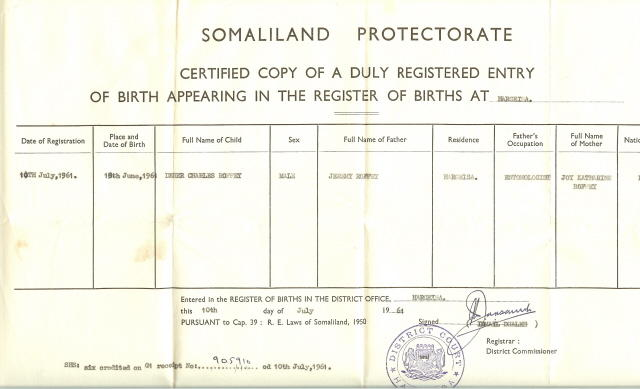
An old Somaliland Protectorate birth certificate

In Somalia, many births go unregistered – owing to the large nomadic population in the country.

Prior to 1991, the Siad Barre government issued birth certificates (Somali: shahaadada dhalashada or warqadda dhalashada) for events occurring in urban areas. Subsequent to the collapse of said government, Somalia ceased to have a functioning birth registration system. As of January 2014, it has been reported by the Dutch Ministry of Foreign Affairs that Somalia has once again started issuing birth certificates, primarily for Somali citizens to be able to obtain the new Somali passport. In Mogadishu, this function is fulfilled by the Mayor of Mogadishu.

Somali autonomous regions, such as Jubaland, Puntland, and Somaliland, have separate, functioning birth registration systems for those born within their respective jurisdictions. In Somaliland, birth certificates are routinely issued only to babies born at a hospital. Home births are registered by way of affidavit with the Somaliland Ministry of Religious Affairs at Hargeisa.

== Sweden ==
Sweden no longer issues birth certificates. Instead, the Swedish Tax Agency will issue a personbevis (extract from the population register) for individuals born in Sweden. This takes the place of both birth and marriage certificates for international purposes. The extract contains, inter alia, place and date of birth, parental information, marriage status, and current registered address.

== Syria ==
In Syria, the father is primarily responsible for registering the birth of a child. Due to the ongoing civil war, many births have gone unregistered.

== South Korea ==
Birth certificates are not issued in Korea. When a foreign embassy requests a birth certificate, Koreans submit a basic certificate containing the place of birth, date of birth, etc., and a family relations certificate containing their parents' resident registration number and name.

== United Kingdom ==
=== England and Wales ===
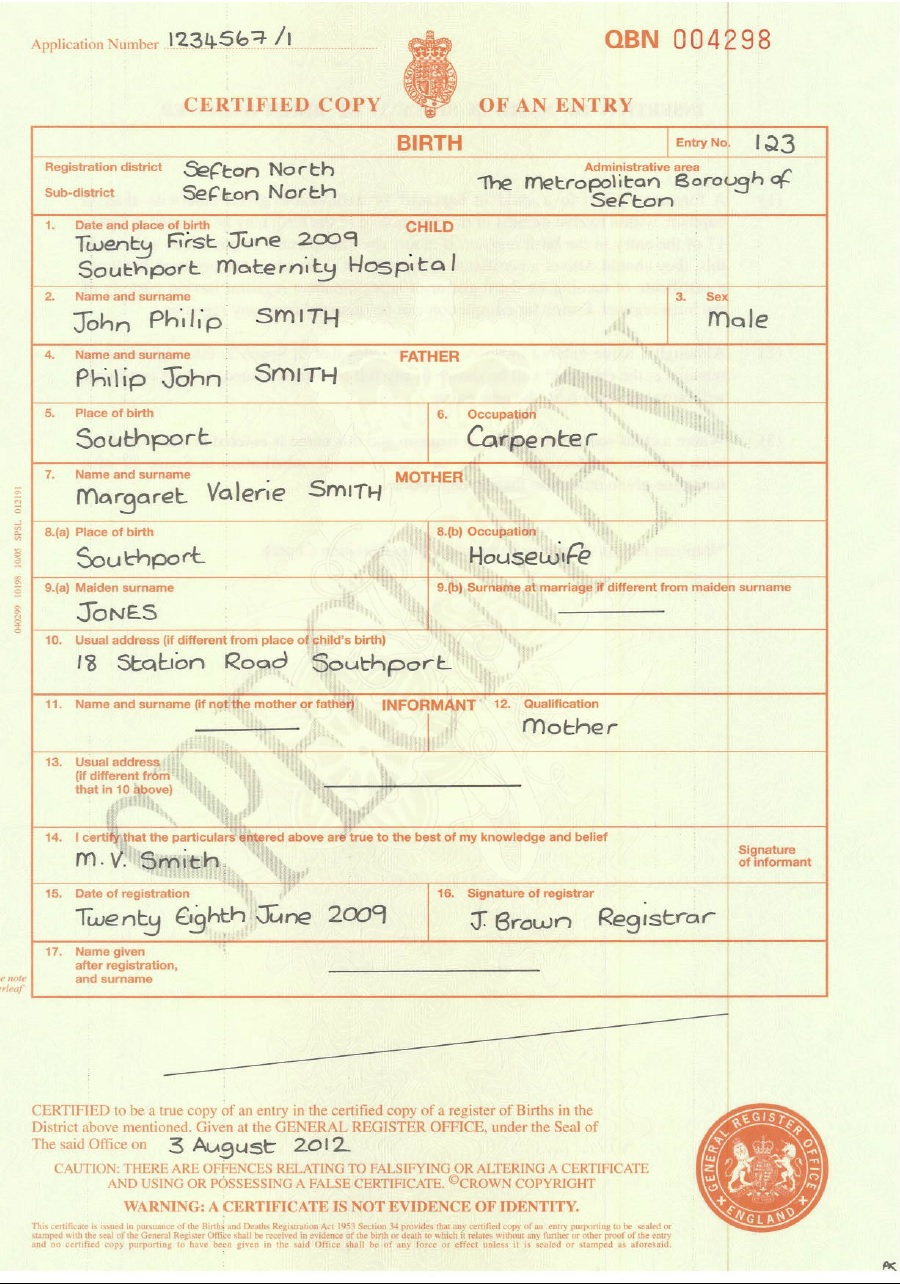
A long-form birth certificate used in England and Wales

In England and Wales, the description "birth certificate" is used to describe a certified copy of an entry in the birth register.

Civil registration of births, marriages and deaths in England and Wales started on 1 July 1837. Registration was not compulsory until 1875, following the Registration of Births and Deaths Act 1874, which made registration of a birth the responsibility of those present at the birth. When a birth is registered, the details are entered into the register book at the local register office for the district in which the birth took place and is retained permanently in the local register office. A copy of each entry in the birth register is sent to the General Register Office (GRO).

==== Pre-1837 birth and baptism records ====
Before the government's registration system was created, evidence of births and/or baptisms (and also marriages and death or burials) was dependent on the events being recorded in the records of the Church of England or in those of other various churches – not all of which maintained such records or all types of those records. Copies of such records are not issued by the General Register Office; but can be obtained from these churches, or from the local or national archive, which usually now keeps the records in original or copy form.

==== Types of certified copies issued in England and Wales ====
Long format certificates are copies of the original entry in the birth register, giving all the recorded details. Information includes; name, sex, date, and place of birth of the child, parents' name, place of birth and occupation. Certificates for births registered before 1 April 1969 do not show the parents' places of birth, and those before 1984 do not show mother's occupation.

Short format certificates show the child's full name, sex, date, and place of birth. They do not give any detail(s) of the parent(s); they therefore do not prove parentage (or nationality). Both versions of a certificate can be used in the verification of identity by acting as a support to other information or documentation provided. Where proof of parentage (or nationality) is required, only a full certificate will be accepted.

The original registrations are required by law to be issued in the form of certified copies to any person who identifies an index entry and pays the prescribed fee. They can be ordered by registered users from the General Register Office Certificate Ordering Service or by postal or telephone ordering from the General Register Office or by post or in person from local registrars. If the birth was registered within the past 50 years, detailed information is required before a certificate will be issued. The General Register Office draws on several registers for the issuance of birth certificates: the Register of Live Births, the Register of Stillbirths, the Abandoned Children Register, the Adopted Children Register, the Parental Order Register, and the Gender Recognition Register (for holders of Gender Recognition Certificates).

The General Register Office also issues birth certificates relating to births on UK-registered aircraft, vessels, and births of His Majesty's Armed Forces dependents. This authority is delegated to the Office by the Registry of Shipping and Seamen, part of the Maritime and Coastguard Agency, for births aboard UK-flagged ships; and by the Civil Aviation Authority for births aboard UK-flagged aircraft.

=== Rest of the British Isles ===
In the rest of the British Isles, there are several different birth registration authorities:

- In Scotland, the National Records of Scotland.
- In Northern Ireland, the General Register Office Northern Ireland (GRONI).
- In Guernsey, the Greffe of the Royal Court of Guernsey.
- In Jersey, the Office of the Superintendent Registrar.
- In the Isle of Man, the Civil Registry. The registration of births in Mann became mandatory in 1878.

=== Other cases ===
Consular birth registration is available for those who establish entitlement to British nationality at birth overseas. This is especially helpful when the jurisdiction in question does not allow multiple citizenship or the registration of an illegitimate child's birth. Prior to 1983, such registrations were accepted as proof of British nationality alone. Pursuant to a Reform Order by the Foreign, Commonwealth and Development Office, new consular birth registrations issued for children born after 1 January 1983, and certificates for people born before that date re-issued starting 1 January 2014, are no longer accepted as stand-alone proof of British nationality.

In addition, certificates of birth issued under the Registration of Births, Deaths and Marriages (Special Provisions) Act 1957 (registered on HM Forces bases overseas), are also not recognised as proof of nationality status alone. Such births would also have to be registered in the local authority where the birth took place, and the parents would have to apply for a foreign certificate as proof of citizenship.

British Overseas Territories have their own independent regimes for issuance of a birth certificate. Additionally, as a result of Argentina's claim over the Falkland Islands, Falklander-born people may also apply for an Argentine birth certificate.

== United States ==
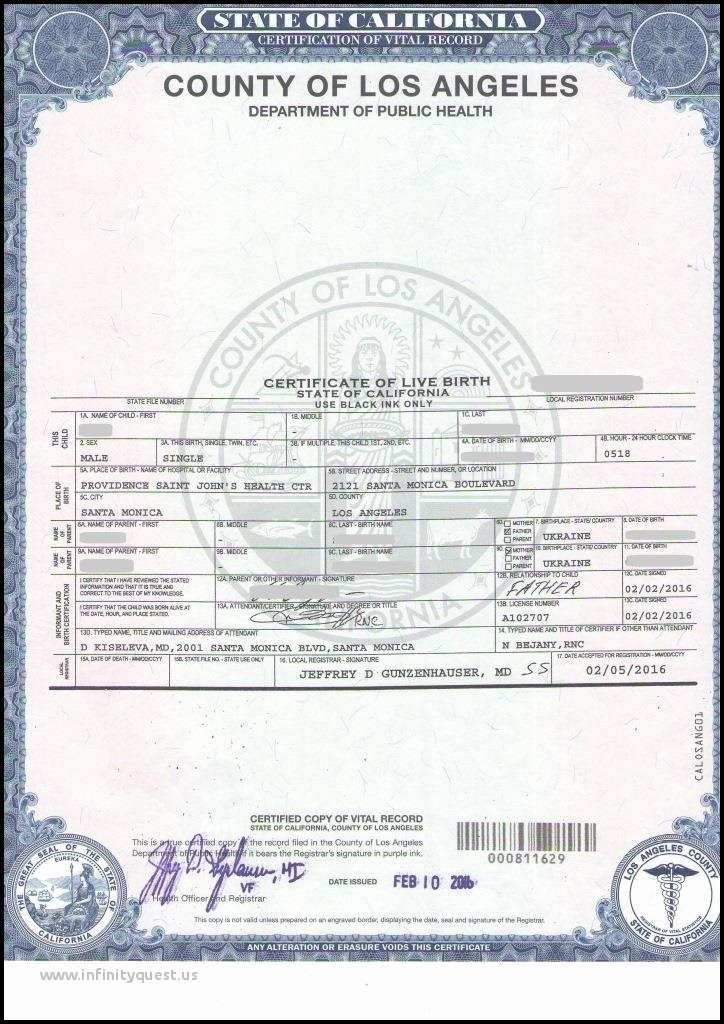
A Californian long-form certified copy of a certificate of live birth

In the U.S., the issuance of birth certificates is a function of the vital statistics agency or equivalent of the state, federal district, territory or former territory of birth. Birth in the U.S. typically confers citizenship by birth (non-citizen nationality in American Samoa), so a U.S. birth certificate doubly serves as evidence of United States citizenship or non-citizen nationality. U.S. birth certificates are therefore commonly provided to the federal government to obtain a U.S. passport.

The U.S. State Department issues a Consular Report of Birth Abroad (CRBA) (which does not technically certify birth but often substitutes for a birth certificate) for children born to U.S. citizens or non-citizen nationals (who are also eligible for citizenship or non-citizen nationality), including births on military bases in foreign territory. Children who do not receive the CRBA at the time of birth may apply for it anytime until the age of 18. Children born abroad who were US citizens at birth because of the citizenship of their parents may receive a USCIS Certificate of Citizenship instead to prove their citizenship status.

The federal and state governments have traditionally cooperated to some extent to improve vital statistics. From 1900 to 1946 the U.S. Census Bureau designed standard birth certificates, collected vital statistics on a national basis, and generally sought to improve the accuracy of vital statistics. In 1946 that responsibility was passed to the U.S. Public Health Service. Unlike the British system of recording all births in "registers", the states file an individual document for each and every birth.

The U.S. National Center for Health Statistics creates standard forms that are recommended for use by the individual states to document births. However, states are free to create their own forms. As a result, neither the appearance nor the information content of birth certificate forms is uniform across states. These forms are completed by the attendant at birth or a hospital administrator, which are then forwarded to a local or state registrar, who stores the record and issues certified copies upon request.

=== Birth certificates for individuals born in or adopted to the United States ===
According to the Department of Health and Human Services, Office of Inspector General, as of 2000 there were more than 6,000 entities issuing birth certificates. The Inspector General report stated that according to the staff at the Immigration and Naturalization Service's Forensics Document Laboratory the number of legitimate birth certificate versions in use exceeded 14,000.

==== Short-form birth certificates and acceptance thereof ====
In the case of applying for a U.S. passport, not all legitimate government-issued birth certificates are acceptable:

A certified birth certificate has a registrar's raised, embossed, impressed or multicolored seal, registrar's signature, and the date the certificate was filed with the registrar's office, which must be within 1 year of your birth. Please note, some short (abstract) versions of birth certificates may not be acceptable for passport purposes.

Beginning June 10, 2009, all birth certificates must also include the full name of the applicant's parent(s).

The U.S. State Department has paid close attention to abstract certificates from both Texas and California. There have been reports of a high incidence of midwife registration fraud along the border region between Texas and Mexico, and the Texas abstract certificate form does not list the name or occupation of the attendant. The California Abstract of Birth did not include an embossed seal, was no longer considered a secure document, and have not been issued in California since 2001.

==== Souvenir birth certificates ====
Most hospitals in the U.S. issue a souvenir birth certificate which may include the footprints of the newborn. However, these birth certificates are not legally accepted as proof of age or citizenship, and are frequently rejected by the Bureau of Consular Affairs during passport applications. Many Americans believe the souvenir records to be their official birth certificates when, in reality, they hold little legal value.

==== Birth certificates after adoption ====
When an adoption is finalized in the U.S., most states and the District of Columbia seal the original birth certificate. In its place, a replacement or amended birth certificate is issued, with the adoptee's new name and adoptive parents listed "as if" the adoptee was born to the adoptive parents. Adopted persons in ten states have an unrestricted right to obtain a copy of the original birth certificate when they are adults: Alabama, Alaska, Colorado, Connecticut, Kansas, Maine, New Hampshire, New York, Oregon, and Rhode Island. The remaining states and the District of Columbia either require a court order to release a copy of the original birth certificate or have other restrictions, such as permission of biological parent(s) or redaction of information upon request of a biological parent.

For foreign-born intercountry adoptees, U.S. jurisdictions may issue a Certificate of Foreign Birth that serves as documentary evidence of the child's birth and the child's legal relationship to the adoptive United States parents. These certificates, however, do not serve as evidence of U.S. citizenship and must be supplemented by another document to prove citizenship, such as a Certificate of Citizenship, a United States passport or a Certificate of Naturalization.

=== Consular reports of birth for individuals born overseas ===
Prior to 1990, the Vital Records Section of the Department's Passport Services office was responsible for certifying American births overseas, and issued form FS-545, formally known as a Certification of Birth Abroad of a Citizen of the United States of America. In 1990, the department changed its policy to make clear that a report issued by them is only supplementary to, and does not substitute for a locally issued birth certificate; the report, however, does serve as prima facie documentary evidence of the acquisition of United States citizenship or non-citizen nationality at birth. The department contends that the issuance of birth certificates is a function that is expressly reserved to local vital statistics authorities and may not be assumed by a consular officer.

Notwithstanding the Department's position, however, a consular report of birth is often the only government-issued record of birth for certain individuals. For example, those born on a U.S. Armed Forces base in Germany do not have their births registered with the local German registrar, but only with the Department of State. Because they cannot receive a German birth certificate, their CRBA is their de facto birth certificate. Between 1990 and December 2010, the department issued form DS-1350, formally known as a Certification of Report of Birth of a United States Citizen; and form FS-240, formally known as the Consular Report of Birth Abroad of a Citizen of the United States of America. Since January 2011, the Department of State has issued only form FS-240.

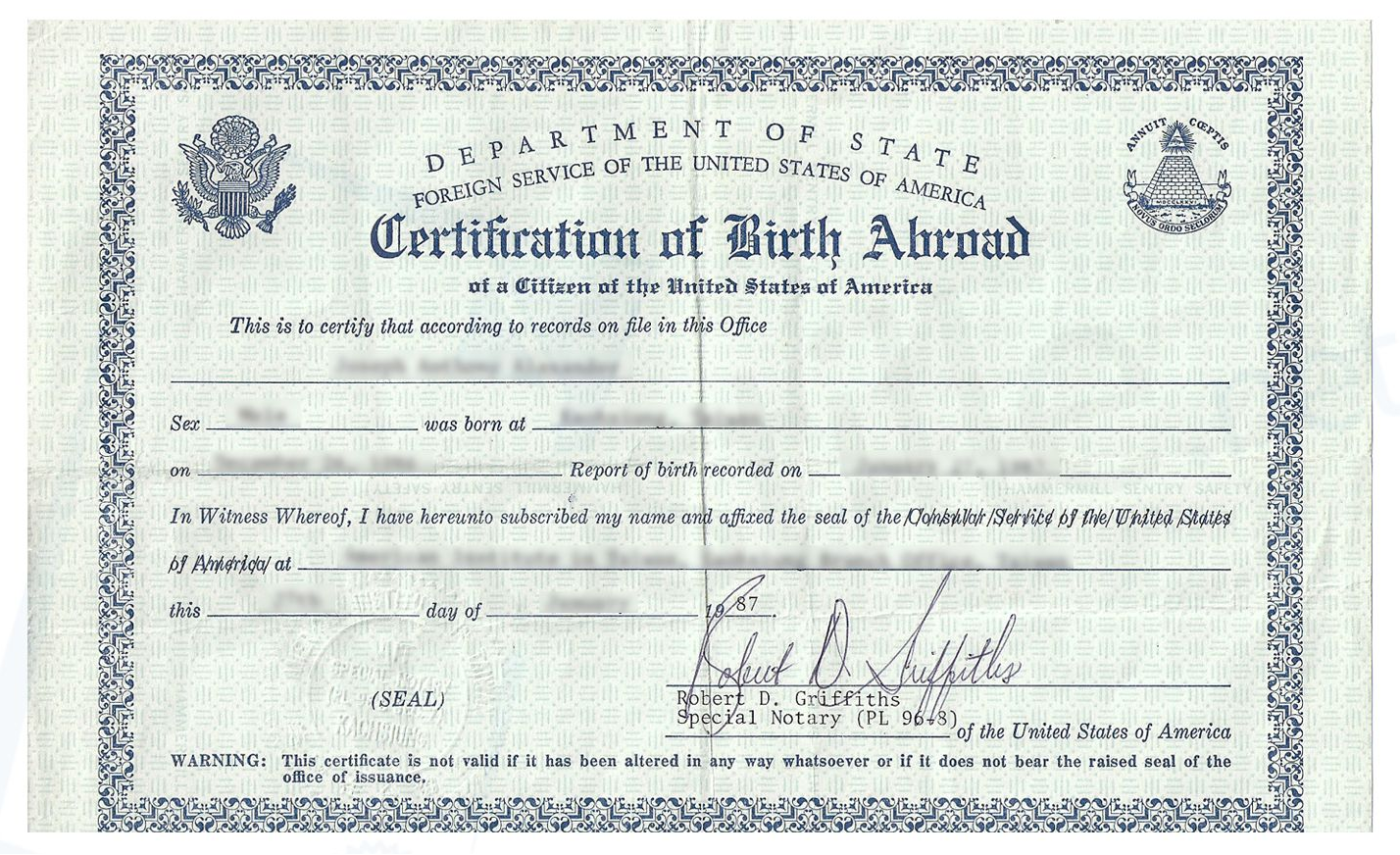
A State Department certification of birth abroad, issued prior to 1990

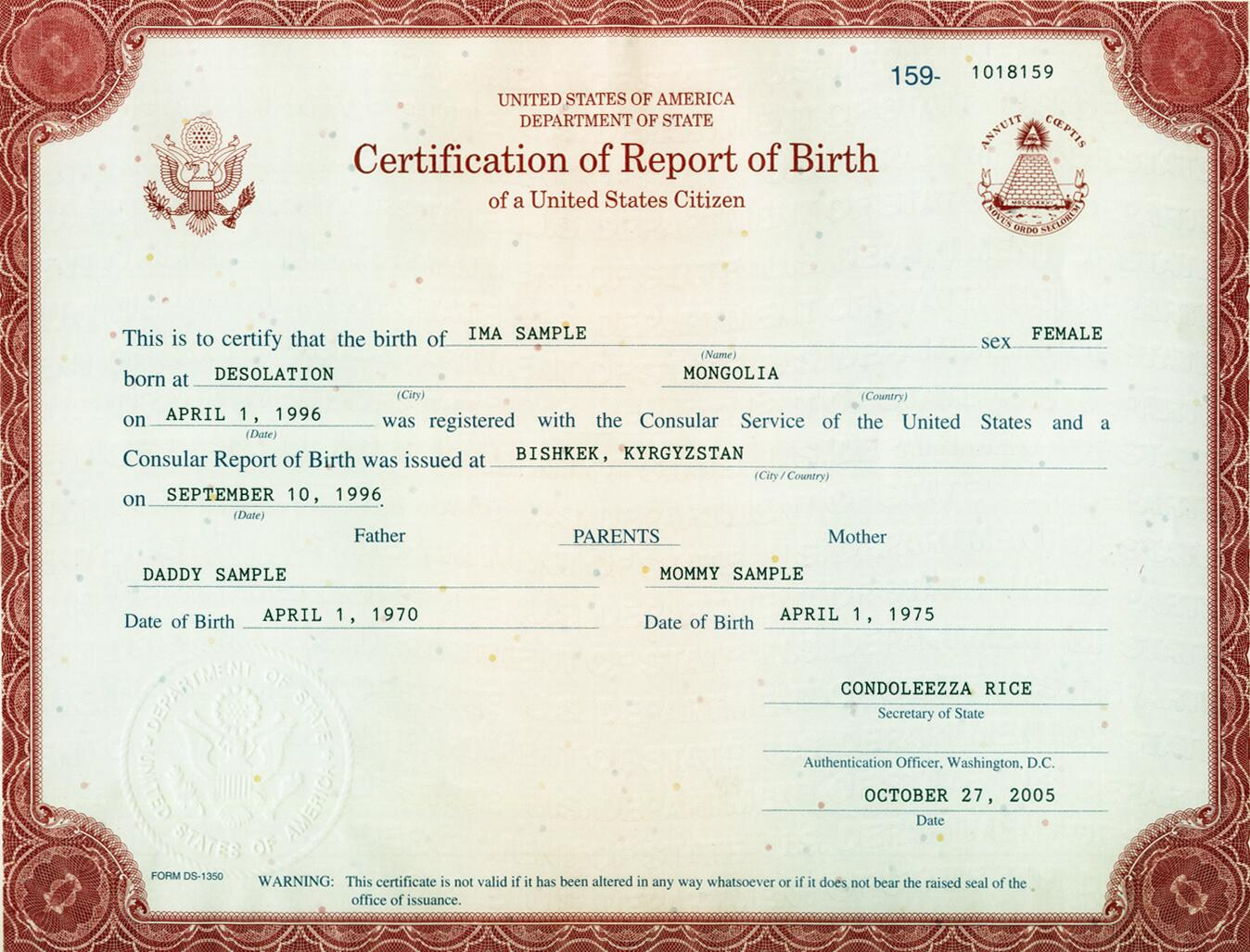
A State Department certification of report of birth, issued between 1990 and 2010

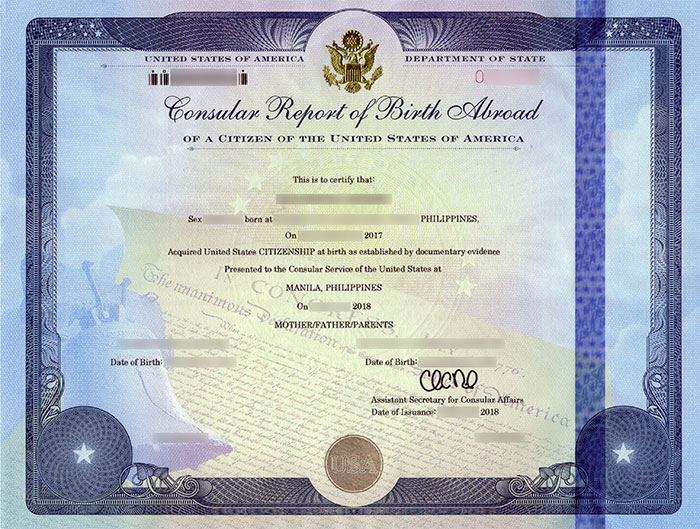
A State Department consular report of birth abroad, issued beginning 2011

== Ukraine ==
In Ukraine, a child's birth must be registered either at the Civil Registry Office or Center for the Provision of Administrative Services located either at the place of the child's birth or at the place of registration of the parents (mother and/or father). Alternatively, either of the parents can order a birth certificate issue online, as a part of child support program application via Ukrainian governmental portal, Diia. In such case, the request for birth registration will be sent to the chosen Civil Registry Office, where the applicant will be able to collect the requested certificate.

If a child is born in a hospital, a medical certificate serves as proof of the place of birth. In cases where a child is born at home, in transport, or in other settings, alternative evidence may be required, such as medical certificates from both mother's gynecologist and a pediatrician or DNA testing in case the former option is unavailable. The parents' place of registration is verified either by a stamp in their domestic passports (for old national ID holders with pre-December 2021 stamps) or via Diia which uses data from digital local registries (except for data from the territories occupied by Russia in 2014-2015, before said registries establishment in 2016). If the residence and registration locations differ, the local Civil Registry Office may still register the child at the parents' registered address.

Upon the birth certificate issue, parents can add it to their digital documents in Diia, which have the same power as physical certificates. Only birth certificates of underage children can be added to the parent's account. Adult citizens may find their own birth certificates added automatically, if the appropriate registry has been digitalised.

Due to the ongoing Russian invasion of Ukraine, many births occurring after the onset of the conflict have gone unregistered. Between 2014 and 2025, approximately 350-450 thousands of children have been born in the occupied territories, but only 15-20% have a Ukrainian birth certificate.

== Controversy ==
In countries such as the United States, the use of the birth certificate to enforce racial segregation, policies of white supremacy, as part of Indigenous erasure, and allotment of Indigenous identity and lands has a history in the Jim Crow era and the 1924 Racial Integrity Act. Problems stemming from the history of adoptions laws, especially the practice of amending the original birth certificate and replacing the information with the adoptive parents "as if" they were the child's birth parents and sealing the original, has prompted a number of recent debates. The use of birth certificates to enforce gender identity has also garnered attention regarding transgender rights.

== See also ==
- Birth registration in ancient Rome
- Birth registration campaign in Liberia
- Closed adoption
- Death certificate
- Identity card
- Marriage certificate
- Marriage license
- Sealed birth records
- Use of birth certificates in smart contracts
