= Swedish Tax Agency =

Government agency of Sweden

- Skatteverket

Agency overview
- Formed: 1 January 2004
- Preceding agency: Swedish National Tax Board
- Jurisdiction: Government of Sweden
- Headquarters: Solna strandväg 10, Solna Municipality, Stockholm County
- Employees: Circa 10,800 (2011)
- Annual budget: SEK 6,100,842,000 (2008)
- Minister responsible: Elisabeth Svantesson, Minister for Finance
- Agency executive: Katrin Westling Palm, Director-general
- Parent agency: Ministry of Finance
- Website: www.skatteverket.se

The Swedish Tax Agency (Swedish: Skatteverket) is a government agency in Sweden responsible for national tax collection and administering the population registration.

The agency was formed on 1 January 2004 through the merger of the Swedish National Tax Board (Riksskatteverket) and the then 10 existing regional tax authorities (skattemyndigheter).

The Swedish Tax Agency (and prior to that, the Swedish National Tax Board) was also formerly the parent agency of the Swedish Enforcement Administration (Kronofogdemyndigheten). Since 1 July 2008, the Swedish Enforcement Administration is an independent agency but with close administrative ties to the Swedish Tax Agency.

The agency has local offices in over a hundred cities across Sweden, with the headquarters located in Solna, Stockholm County.

== Responsibilities ==
The Swedish Tax Agency has a broader remit than tax administration. Under its statutory instructions, it determines and collects taxes, social-security contributions and other charges and establishes assessed values for real property. It also administers population registration and personal names, issues identity cards to registered residents, registers estate inventories, maintains the marriage register, works to prevent and investigate certain forms of economic crime, and performs certain functions as a creditor on behalf of the state.

Population registration is an important non-tax function of the agency. The register supplies other public authorities with information about residents' identity, residence and family relationships, and Skatteverket issues the Swedish personal identity number, which is widely used as an identifier in dealings with both public authorities and private organizations.

== See also ==
- Taxation
- Taxation in Sweden
- Swedish Taxpayers' Association
- Population registration in Sweden
- Swedish F-tax certificate
- Skatterättsnämnden
