= Swedish F-tax certificate =

Type of tax in Sweden

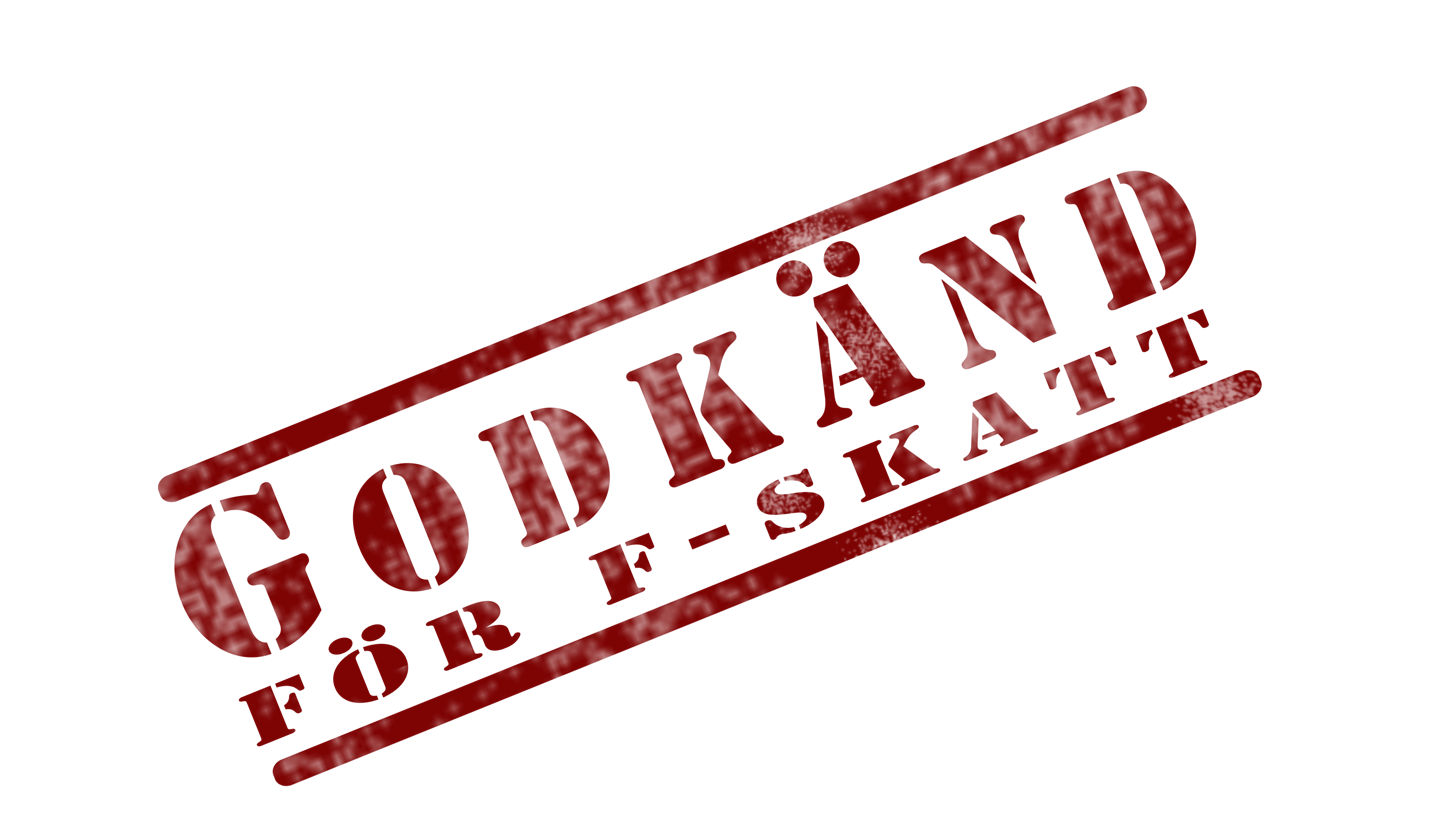
The text "Approved for F-tax" designed as a stamp. Can be used on websites or invoices.

F-tax is a tax paid by a self-employed person in Sweden.

Sole proprietors (sole traders) in Sweden who actively conduct business usually hold an F-tax certificate, which signifies that the sole proprietors themselves are liable to pay their own corporate taxes and social security contributions every month.

When a business is approved for F-tax, the business owner's customers are not required to deduct taxes on payments made for work performed in Sweden.

== See also ==
- Swedish Tax Agency
- Taxation in Sweden
- Swedish Taxpayers' Association
