= Robert Gidehag =

Swedish economist

Claes Robert Gidehag (born 23 May 1969 in Sollentuna, Stockholm County) is a Swedish economist and the President of the Swedish Taxpayers' Association. He has previously worked at the Swedish Ministry of Finance, at the National Bank of Sweden and as chief economist at the Swedish Research Institute of Trade.
