= Taxation in Sweden =

Taxation in Sweden on salaries for an employee involves contributing to three different levels of government: the municipality, the county council, and the central government. Social security contributions are paid to finance the social security system.

Income tax on salaries is deducted by the employer (a PAYE system) and paid directly by the employer to the Swedish Tax Agency (Skatteverket).

The effective taxation rate in Sweden is commonly cited as among the highest in the world; see list of countries by tax rates.

Total tax revenue as a percentage of GDP for Sweden over the past several decades compared to other highly developed states

Sweden has a taxation system for income from work that combines an income tax (paid by the employee) with social security contributions (employers contributions) that are paid by the employer. The total salary cost for the employer is thereby the gross salary plus the payroll tax. The employer makes monthly preliminary deductions (PAYE) for income tax and also pays the payroll tax to the Swedish Tax Agency.

The income tax is contingent on the person being taxable in Sweden, and the social security contributions are contingent on the person being part of the Swedish social insurance plan. The income tax is finalised through a yearly tax assessment the year following the income year.

27% of taxpayer money in Sweden goes towards education and healthcare, whereas 5% goes to the police and military, and 42% to social security.

== Value added tax and 1960s indirect taxation reforms ==
Value added tax (VAT) which originated in France in 1954, is a tax added on the supply of goods and services. In this way, making it impossible for individuals to evade tax. VAT was introduced in Sweden in 1969, replacing the previous retail sales tax (omsättningskatt). This was at a time when the country´s tax policy was moving toward greater dependence on indirect taxation and was a part of the Swedish reform of the indirect tax structure. The reform supporting indirect taxation was implemented due to the need for an additional source of revenue to meet the social responsibilities of affluence. With Sweden´s flourishing economy, public consumption through education, welfare, national defense, healthcare etc. was rising rapidly. Improvement of the public sector, in addition to a growing population resulted in the costs rising. When all these costs went up, taxes rose as well, and Sweden became the country with the second highest ratio of taxes to gross domestic product (at 37.1%) among the OECD countries.

The second reason for Sweden implementing the indirect tax reforms was the weight of the existing direct tax burden. The country had an extremely progressive individual income tax, in addition to the inhabitants having to pay a progressive annual net wealth tax on the value of capital assets beyond 100,000 kronor. Thus, being a large supplemental tax on unearned income. In addition, the local government units in Sweden rely almost only on a local income tax as their basis of revenue, and with local expenditures such as hospitals and school buildings rising, this tax rose as well.

With all these taxes rising, the Swedish government´s reasoning for this reform was with two goals in mind: 1) no decrease of the government's tax receipts 2) no transfer of any substantial part of the tax burden from business to the consumer. Thus, the need for an indirect tax system arose.

Today, the value added tax (mervärdesskatt or moms) rate in Sweden is 25%, with exceptions for food and services like hotel room rental fees (12%), and for sales of publications, admission tickets to cultural events and travel within Sweden (6%).

== Income tax ==
Sweden has a flat tax at every level of government, however, because the national tax has a much higher exemption, the combined tax rate by all levels is progressive. The rates for 2024 are as follows (based on yearly incomes):

Sweden Income Tax Rates
Income (SEK)	National Rate	Local Rate (Municipal + County)
0	0%	0%
Up to: 598,500	0%	28.98% - 35.30%
Over: 614,000	20%	28.98% - 35.30%

Taxable income is reduced by general deductions which means that the marginal tax in practice varies between 8.2% on incomes just above 20,008 kronor to 55.6% on incomes above 780,000 kronor. For an average salary, on an additional pay of 100 kronor, the employee pays 32.7 kronor in income tax.

== Local income tax and the equalization system ==
The main source for local authorities and country councils in Sweden is a local income tax which is paid by 85% of the population. These 85% are citizens earning above a certain level of income, and the tax is added to the national income tax.

Sweden has various types of local authority with 290 municipalities (kommuner) and 18 country councils (landsting). Furthermore, there are two regions, Västra Götaland and Skåne, where the regional councils are directly elected and the responsibility for the major part of the national government´s regional development resources for the region lies. Additionally, they are responsible for health care and generally hold more power than the other counties. Lastly, there is the island municipality of Gotland which combines the functions of county council and the municipality. The municipalities hold various functions. The ones exclusive to the municipalities are town planning, all primary and secondary education, water and sewage, parks and open spaces, most welfare functions and refuse collection. While the ones shared with country councils and the central government are some culture and leisure activities, regional/spatial planning and environmental and consumer protection. The most financially burdensome and important functions of all these are education and social welfare. Therefore, Sweden has implemented constitutional laws that give the local authorities the right to raise necessary taxes to fulfill these duties. Thus, local authorities are free to set their own rates. In 2003 the average rate was 31.17%. The rates over the country are quite equal due to the present equalization system which was introduced in 1996. This system is horizontal because the resources are transferred between local authorities. Equalization is achieved by evening out differences in tax bases and structural conditions (age, geographical distance etc.). However, the system has been criticized for putting high burdens on a small number of municipalities (especially Stockholm) and has undergone many revisions due to this.

== Payroll tax ==
Due to the implementation of value-added tax resulting in a reduction of the tax burden on businesses, Sweden made up this deficiency from the business sector by an adoption of an employers' payroll tax . These payroll taxes imposed on employers have become an increasingly important part of the Swedish tax system, which is highlighted in their sharp increase since originally implemented (they amounted to 6% of the wage bills of private businesses in 1950, but 40% in the late 1970s).

As of 2026, the Swedish social security contribution paid by the employer is 31.42%, calculated on top of the employee's salary before taxes. The percentage is lower for old employees. The specifics of the payroll tax (National Insurance in UK English) may be found at the Swedish Tax Agency's Website. In addition, the employee pays 7% in pension contributions to the public system, with a cap at an annual income of 420,447 kr. Thus, the maximum employee contribution is 29,400 kr. However, this contribution is neutralized by a corresponding income tax reduction (tax credit) for the employee.

== Corporate and capital gains tax ==
Corporate net income is taxed at a flat rate of 20.6%. Sweden has a flat tax rate of 30% for capital gains. The Swedish tax authorities defines capital gains as incomes that can not be attributed to business operations or service. For example; rental of private assets, dividends, profit from the sale of assets and interest payments. With an investment savings account (Investeringssparkonto; ISK) a private individual pay a yearly tax instead of the capital gains tax. This account can be used for buying and selling shares in stock markets globally as well as funds. This tax varies from year to year depending on interest rate levels and other factors but in general is less than 1% of the current value.

== Registering a non-Swedish company or sole trader in Sweden ==
A foreign company conducting business in Sweden, whether a natural or a legal person, may become taxable for VAT, employer's contributions and/or income tax. The company should then apply for registration at the Swedish Tax Agency, and may apply for a Swedish F-tax certificate.

In the ‘Tax application for foreign entrepreneurs´ brochure and form, SKV 419 and SKV 4632 respectively, there is information on how to submit the application.

Sole traders who have a Swedish personal number, and corporations that have a representative who has a Swedish personal number and who is also authorised to sign (authorised to sign by himself) on behalf of the company, may submit the application electronically through the verksamt.se website. Verksamt.se is jointly managed by the Swedish Tax Agency, the Swedish Companies Registration Office and the Swedish Agency for Economic and Regional Growth. Other foreign companies may submit their application directly to the International Tax Offices at the Swedish Tax Agency by post. When registered with the Swedish Tax Agency, the foreign company receives a unique Swedish identity number. For natural persons to receive such a number they must verify their identity with a passport or another such identity card or documentation. For a legal person it is required that the identity is verified with some form of attested certificate of registration/incorporation and that the representative demonstrates his/her authority to represent (sign) on behalf of the legal person when it requests registration for taxation. Foreign legal persons active in Sweden should first contact the Swedish Companies Registration Office to ask if they are required to register a branch office. If such a registration is made with the Swedish Companies Registration Office, they will supplied with a Swedish registration number by the Swedish Tax Agency. For contact information, see the Swedish Companies Registrations Office website.

Further information in English can be found on the Swedish Tax Agency's website.

Buying a Swedish company or Swedish real-estate does not necessarily give right of residence in Sweden. Fraudsters have sold such assets claiming they would give right of residence.

== See also ==
- Swedish Taxpayers' Association
- Swedish Tax Agency
- Swedish F-tax certificate
