= Birth registration campaign in Liberia =

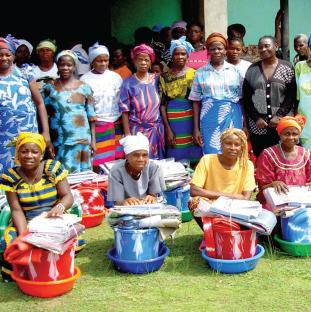
Training programs for traditional midwives are an effective method of improving the health of mothers and babies.

The Liberian government is conducting a birth registration campaign to record more than 70,000 children whose births were not listed during the Ebola crisis of 2014 and 2015. Previously Liberia had the second lowest rate of birth registration at 4 percent. But a Universal Birth Registration Plan was introduced, and by 2013, birth registration drives had increased the rates in Liberia to 25 percent.

== 2015 post Ebola birth registration drive ==
During the Ebola outbreak in 2014 and 2015, Liberia birth registrations dropped sharply. In 2014 many health facilities closed or had reduced services in response to the Ebola crisis, and there was a 39 per cent decrease in births registered over the previous year. In 2013, before the beginning of the Ebola epidemic, the births of 79,000 children were registered, while in 2014 the number of registrations dropped to 48,000. And only 700 children in Liberia had their births registered between January and May 2015. UNICEF is supporting a drive to implement registration systems throughout the country, and will assist with training and outreach for a nationwide campaign to register the children missed in 2014 and 2015.

== Prior birth registration drive ==
Historically, Liberia had a low level of birth registrations. In 2007, birth registration rates were estimated at 4 or 5 percent. A field survey by the Ministry of Health and Social Welfare in 2008 indicated that was not a properly working birth registration system in Liberia. The government in Liberia identified the development of an improved birth registration system as a national priority in the Liberian Poverty Reduction Strategy. And by 2013, birth registration drives had increased the rates in Liberia to 25 percent.
