= Birth registration in ancient Rome =

Roman birth certificates

Birth certificates for Roman citizens were introduced during the reign of Augustus (27 BC–14 AD). Until the time of Alexander Severus (222–235 AD), it was required that these documents be written in Latin as a marker of "Romanness" (Romanitas).

There are 21 extant birth registration documents of Roman citizens. A standard birth registration included the date of birth.

== Legality ==
Ancient Roman birth certificates were introduced in 4 AD due to the lex Aelia Sentia and the lex Papia Poppaea, which were pieces of legislation passed by Emperor Augustus. Within 30 days of a child's birth their parents, grandparents, or a representative of the family would legally declare their birth at the Temple of Saturn. This process was known as professio. Children born illegitimately were prohibited from being registered by Augustus, although Marcus Aurelius may have removed this restriction. It is unknown why the process of birth registration was established by the lex Aelia Sentia. One possibility is that it was used to determine if a master was at least 20 or younger when freeing a slave. Birth registrations were also used to determine if a family had at least 3 children, and was therefore eligible for privileges under the lex Papia Poppaea. This law was designed to encourage families to procreate and increase birth rates.

Completing birth registrations in Roman society were not compulsory. Whereas penalties for failure to register in the census existed, no known penalties existed in regard to birth registrations. In terms of Roman law, individuals who did not register their birth were neither penalized nor disadvantaged: there are imperial rescripts (a written answer of a Roman emperor to a query or petition in writing) that state that the failure to register children should not deprive them or their right to legitimacy, and there are recorded statements of Roman Emperors Diocletian and Maximian that inform an individual that “It is a well-established rule of law that though a declaration of birth has been lost, your status is not adversely affected.”

Birth registrations could be used as proof of age; however, from historical evidence, it is clear that they were not regarded as sufficient proof in themselves. Oral and written evidence could be used as proof of age. For instance, the emperor Hadrian stated in a rescript that when the age of an individual was at issue, all proofs of age should be furnished and a decision reached based on the most credible evidence. In another case, the Roman jurist Modestinus concluded that in order to prove one’s age for exemption of certain responsibilities, “age is proved either by notices of birth or by other customary (lawful) evidence.”

== Illegitimacy ==
Roman society did not stigmatize illegitimacy to the extent of later Western societies. A freeborn person who was illegitimate enjoyed higher social status than a freedman. Illegitimate children did have some disadvantages under the law. Their birth could not be officially registered during the first 150 years when birth certificates existed. A law passed in 178 AD, however, gave illegitimate children the same right as legitimate children to share in their mother's property if she died without leaving a will. After the Empire had come under Christian rule, this right was taken away from those born outside wedlock.

For illegitimate children, the date of birth was more complex and less authoritative since it was either as originally recorded or as copied from the public register.

== Roman Egypt ==
Two separate processes of birth registrations existed in Roman Egypt: one process for Roman citizens that was conducted in Latin, and another process for Greco-Egyptians that was conducted in Greek. These two processes were, in legal terms, totally unrelated.

There are 34 available birth registration documents of Greco-Egyptian citizens that span some 270 years. With the initiative of the father or another close relative, standard birth registrations included the name and current age of the individual concerned and was addressed to an official.

Greco-Egyptian birth registrations were not compulsory and were more of a certification of status than proof of birth. The census eliminated the need of birth registrations because the information gathered from birth registrations merely supplemented the information from the census. Age was particularly important for determining who was liable to pay the poll tax at the age of 14 years.

Birth registrations could provide the age of the individual; however, the census was held every 14 years to ensure that no one escaped the tax and also provided this information. The census was more efficient and thorough than the system of birth registrations in Greco-Egyptian society, and government officials relied on the information from the census far more than birth registrations.

== See also ==
- List of Roman birth and childhood deities
