= Skatterättsnämnden =

Swedish government agency

Skatterättsnämnden (English: Council for Advance Tax Rulings) is a Swedish government agency. It is part of the Ministry of Finance and it is responsible for providing legally binding advance tax rulings in response to tax questions.
