= Swedish Taxpayers' Association =

The Swedish Taxpayers' Association (Swedish: Skattebetalarnas förening) is an association and taxpayers union in Sweden which advocates low taxes and efficiency in the public sector. The association was first founded in 1921 and since then has grown very fast. It issues its own magazine, the Common Sense (Sunt Förnuft), four times a year. The current chairman of the board is Pia Kinhult and the CEO (since October 2016) is Christian Ekström.

== History ==
The association was first founded in the spring of 1921 under the initiative of Marcus Wallenberg Sr., former CEO of the Stockholms Enskilda Bank, to promote better management of tax revenue. The founders were mainly business leaders who were concerned that political leaders and “the ignorant mass” would undermine the entrepreneurship and economic progress without an independent organization offering supervision. Their methods were simple and direct: reveal the waste and misuse of tax revenue in the public sector and convince the public that the heavy taxation will bring threat to work, saving and entrepreneurship. At the end of 1925, the association has grown into an influential organization with over 40,000 members. Later, it also became the model for similar organizations in Denmark, Finland, and Norway.

Just as the tax foundation in the United States began to calculate the “tax freedom day” in 1971, the association also began its own calculation for Sweden in the same year.

In the 1980s, the association held a series of campaigns for tax reduction. One of its slogans was "half left" (hälften kvar) at the time. This probably is one of the factors that led to a significant reform in Sweden called “tax reform of the century” in 1990 and 1991, introduced by the then Social Democratic government.

Also, in 2007, the abolition of the property tax and the wealth tax by the alliance government was, to some degree, due to the association’s long-term campaign together with other organizations like the House Owners National Association (Villaägarnas riksförbund) and the Shareholders’ Association (Aktiespararna).

In 2016, the association revealed to the public that 200,000 retirees missed the promised tax relief because of the wrong calculation from the government institutions.

The association is a member of several international taxpayers organizations like the World Taxpayers Association and the Taxpayers Association of Europe.

== Association Structure ==
According to its statutes, the association works to promote the following goals:

- Economy and efficiency in the public sector.
- Low and visible taxes.
- Simple and clear tax legislation.
- Legal certainty for taxpayers.

Both natural and legal persons are entitled to membership. Members pay prescribed fees for the association, which is decided by the annual general meeting. Membership is valid from the first of the following month after payment. Each member has one vote in the association. Membership ceases if members don’t pay the fee or apply for a quit. In other conditions, if a member brings some damage to the association obviously, the board can exclude it with 2/3 majority approval. The decision takes effect immediately.

The annual general meeting of the association will be held every year in May. The meeting has multiple functions: the election of the Board; determination of the fees for the Board and auditors; discharge of members of the Board and CEO; election of auditors and deputy auditors; election of Nomination Committee; determination of the annual fee; report from the Board, CEO and the auditors; voting. Decisions are made by a simple majority of the meeting.

The Board of the association consists of one chairman, two vice-chairmen, and six other members. The term of the chairman and vice-chairman is three years. The Board is responsible for the association’s management and has the power to appoint a CEO, who works under the guidelines of the Board. Board members shouldn’t be members of parliament, county council, or city council. But there is no barrier to membership in parties or organizations. The rule is only designed to serve the political independence of the association.

The Board also needs to build the committee (AU) which consists of three to five people, to prepare matters for discussion in the Board.

== Attempted political coup ==
In 2005, Sweden Democrats (SD), National Democrats (ND), and other related anti-immigration far-right organizations led by Carl Lundström and Kenneth Sandberg tried a coup against the Swedish Taxpayers Association. Its main goal was to gain greater influence within the association, by getting their supporters to attend the annual general meeting in Malmo, to lead the organization in the direction of Sweden Democrats’ policy to emphasize the negative impact and burden of immigration on domestic taxpayers’ interests. The attempted coup has once brought a great threat to the association’s independent position in politics. But once the news reached the ears of the Conservatives and the Liberal Party, they sent their own supporters to the annual general meeting in Malmo to counteract SD/ND supporters. Even, they bought tickets for their supporters from Stockholms to Malmo in an anonymous way. In the end, the efforts of SD/ND ended in failure. Then chairman of the association Claes Levin was re-elected.

== Waste Ombudsman ==
The association has a member working as a Waste Ombudsman (SlösO) who has the responsibility to review use of public funds.

== Chairman ==
- 1921–1943: Marcus Wallenberg
- 1943–1953: Ragnar Blomquist
- 1953–1969: Jacob Wallenberg
- 1969–1976: Curt Nicolin
- 1976–1983: Hans Stahle
- 1983–1999: Tom Wachtmeister
- 1999–2003: Björn Wolrath
- 2003–2007: Claes Levin
- 2007–2016: Dick Kling
- 2016–: Pia Kinhult

== CEOs ==
- 1921–1929: Erland Nordlund
- 1930–1954: Lars Akselson
- 1955–1963: Sven-Ivar Ivarsson
- 1963–1984: Ulf Öjeman
- 1985–2000: Björn Tarras-Wahlberg
- 2000–2003: Gunnar Eliasson
- 2004–2012: Robert Gidehag
- 2013–2016: Joacim Olsson
- 2016–: Christian Ekström
